= Port of La Turballe =

Coastal facility

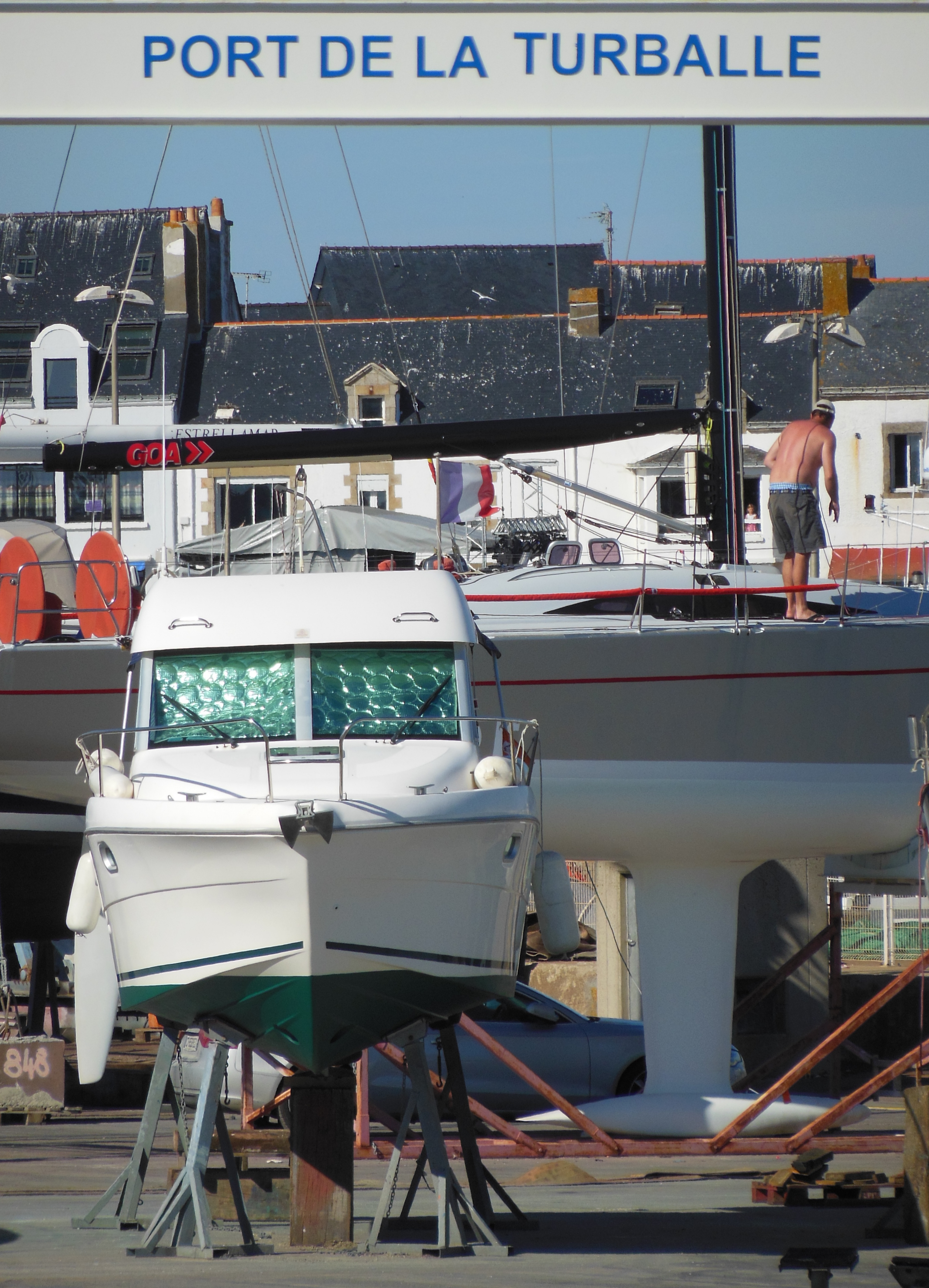
- Port of La Turballe, careening area
- Interactive map of Port of La Turballe

Location
- Country: France
- Location: La Turballe
- Coordinates: 47°20′47″N 2°30′43″W

Details
- Operated by: Département de la Loire-Atlantique
- Owned by: Department of Loire-Atlantique
- Activities: Fishing port Marina; Fish market Careening
- Equipment: Marina

The port of La Turballe is a French coastal facility combining fishing and recreational boating activities. It includes a fish auction hall and a careening yard. The port is located in the commune of La Turballe, in the Loire-Atlantique department, within the “rade du Croisic,” the bay extending from Croisic Point in the south to Castelli Point in Piriac-sur-Mer in the northwest.

== Presentation ==
The Loire-Atlantique department has 133 kilometers of coastline. The port of La Turballe is the only deep-water port between the Loire and Vilaine estuaries, with the other ports being tidal. It is part of the Saint-Nazaire registration district and supports multiple maritime activities:

- Fishing, the original and main activity, supported by dedicated docks, a fishing fleet, and a fish auction hall.
- Ship repair, (Note: The first shipbuilding and repair yard in La Turballe was established in 1975 by Marcel Vandernotte. The 2,000 m² facility was located in the Marjolaine area, on the site now occupied by the Super U gas station. Vandernotte sold the company in 1988, and operations ceased shortly thereafter under the new ownership.) for both fishing and recreational boats, made possible by a high-capacity boat lift and a careening area.
- Recreational boating, benefiting from the deep-water port.
- Passenger traffic, a secondary activity that provides connections in July and August to the islands of Houat, Hœdic, and Belle-Île-en-Mer.
- Renewable marine energy, with the maintenance base for the Saint-Nazaire Offshore Wind Farm.

== Fishing ==
The fishing port of La Turballe, owned by the Loire-Atlantique Departmental Council, has been managed since January 1, 2011, by the semi-public company Loire-Atlantique Pêche et Plaisance. (Note: The mixed-economy company Loire-Atlantique Pêche et Plaisance was established in 2010 by the Loire-Atlantique Department to manage the mixed fishing and pleasure ports of Le Croisic and La Turballe. The company, holder of the public service management delegation, has a share capital of €600,000, employs 36 people, and has an annual turnover of approximately €5.3 million. Its objectives include overseeing the marketing of fish products in Loire-Atlantique and supporting the development of the ports under its management.) It is the leading fishing port in the Pays de la Loire region and ranks fourteenth in France, with 4,900 tons of fish landed in 2023. The port provides employment for around 300 people in various sectors, including fishing, fish trading, wholesale, transport, marine mechanics, and auction services.

The main species landed at the port include anchovy (25%), sardine (19%), albacore tuna (16%), hake (15%), cuttlefish (6%), mackerel (6%), squid (3%), sea bass (3%), grey sea bream (2%), whiting (1%), sole (1%), mullet (1%), and horse mackerel (1%). Since June 2012, some of these species have been certified under the Produit en Presqu’île de Guérande label, established by an association supported by the Chambers of Trades and Crafts, Agriculture, and Commerce and Industry. This label promotes the quality of local products and the know-how of producers from the Guérande peninsula.

=== Fleet ===
In 2024, the La Turballe fishing fleet comprised 53 vessels, each with a maximum length of 25 meters and hulls made of wood, metal, or plastic. The port is dedicated exclusively to artisanal fishing. Larger boats are moored in the Garlahy basin, which has been protected by a storm gate since 1991, while smaller vessels are docked near the marina.

Among the boats registered at the port, 55 are listed with the Fisheries Committee: 20 pelagic vessels measuring 20 to 24 meters, 24 trawlers between 10 and 20 meters, and several line, net, or trap fishers ranging from 8 to 12 meters, depending on the season. In 2015, the commune had approximately 250 fishers.

Fishing methods practiced at La Turballe include fixed gear, such as traps, nets, lines, and longlines, as well as towed gear, including bottom and pelagic trawls. Depending on vessel size and fishing area, trips may range from 4 to 20 days for offshore fishing, 1 to 4 days for coastal fishing, and less than 24 hours for small-scale fishing. Catches are sorted on board, packed in boxes with flake ice supplied from the port’s ice tower, and stored in onboard refrigeration units. The fish are then unloaded at the port using cranes installed in 1984 and 2024 and transported to the auction hall.

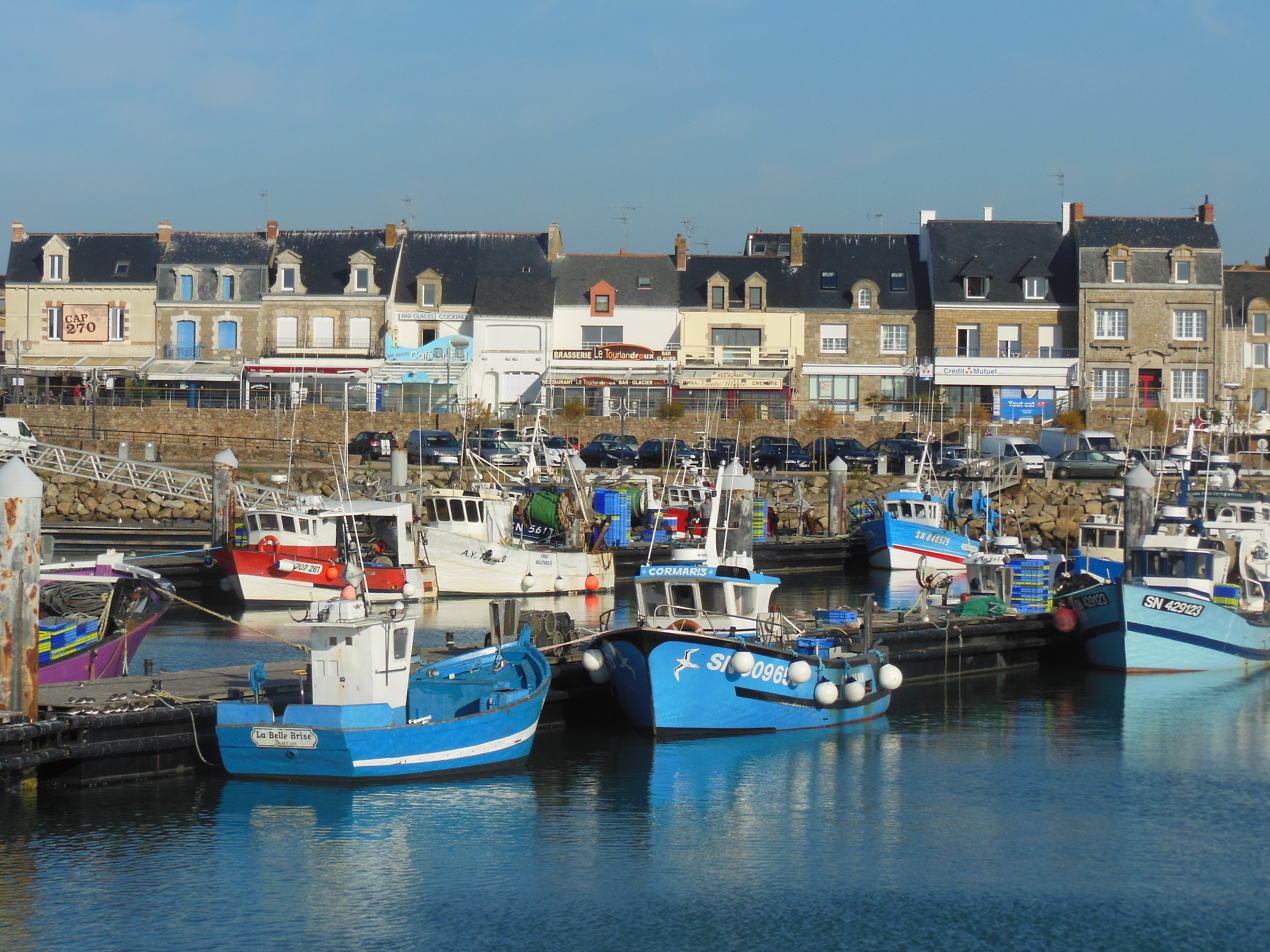
Fishing boats in the old port.

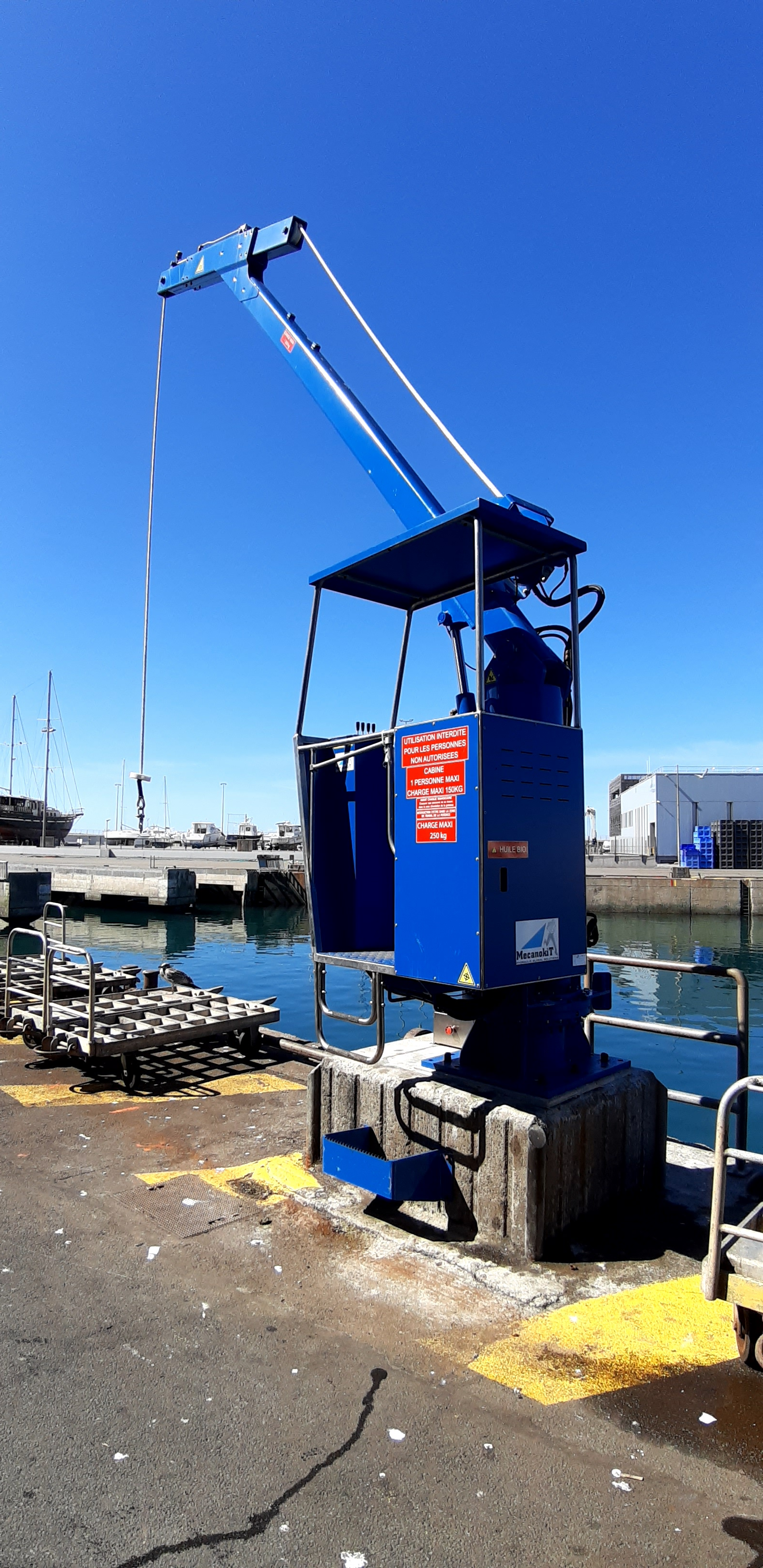
Unloading crane acquired by the port in 2024.

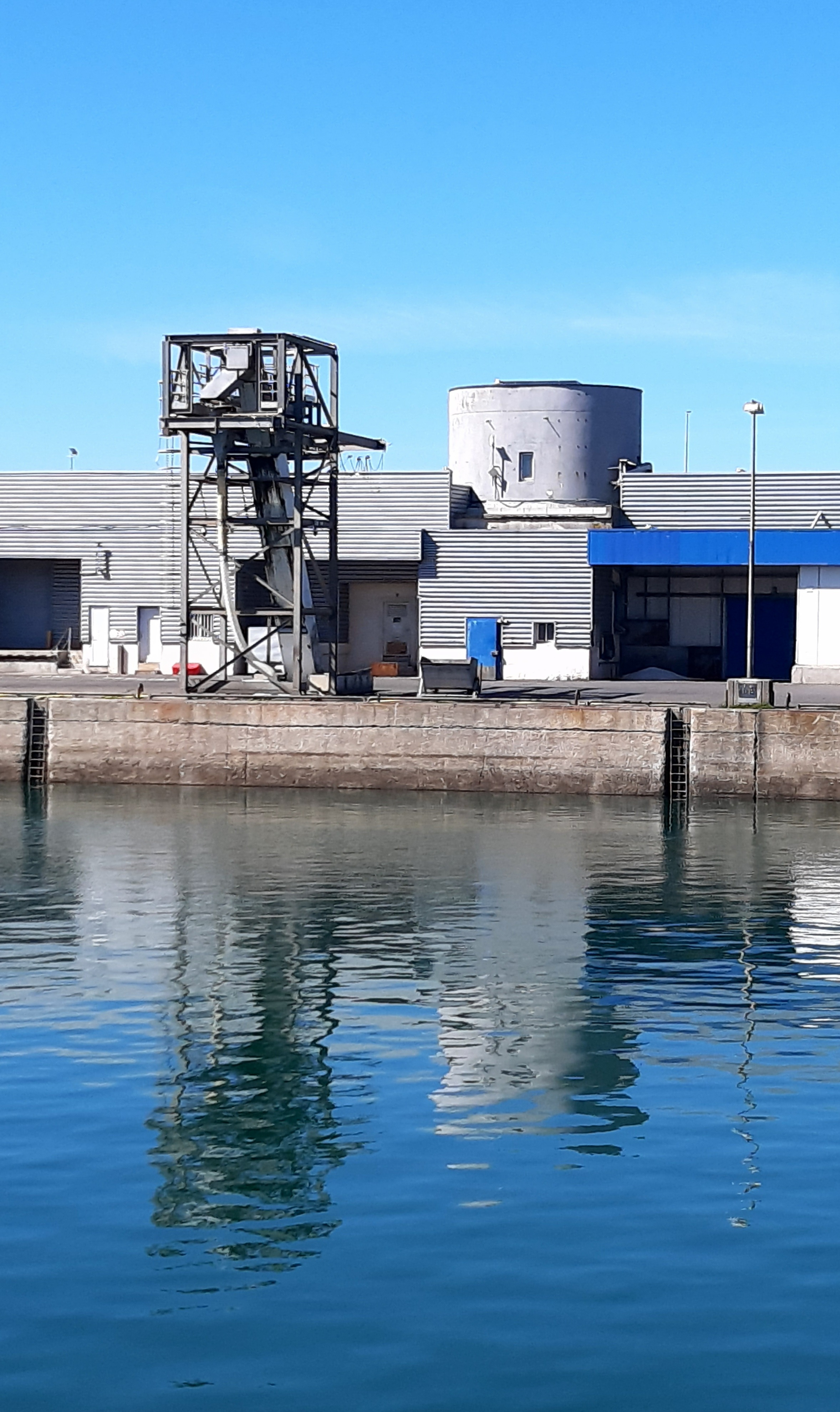
Ice tower: ice is produced in the cylindrical tower, conveyed to the gantry, lifted by a conveyor belt, and loaded onto fishing boats.

=== Fish auction ===
The fish auction hall at La Turballe was inaugurated on June 13, 1970, replacing an earlier facility demolished the same year. Auctions take place from Monday to Friday between 4:00 and 6:00 a.m. Since 2011, the ports of La Turballe and Le Croisic have been jointly managed by the Loire-Atlantique Departmental Council. Both auction halls remain in operation, with shared technical resources.

Renovated in 1995, the La Turballe auction hall comprises a sorting and weighing area, a cold room maintained at +2 °C for fish storage, and a 1,000 m² temperature-controlled auction hall kept between 7 °C and 8 °C for professional use. The facility also includes 12 processing workshops with individual cold rooms, two refrigerated waste rooms, a container washing area, a shipping terminal with five loading docks, and ice plants capable of producing up to 100 tons of ice per day with automated continuous distribution. Additional cold storage rooms with a total capacity of 130 tons ensure product preservation.

Before the boats return, cargo details are communicated to the port for entry on the landing declaration board. After unloading, the fish is weighed, labeled, and stored in a cold room pending a veterinary inspection. It is then transferred to the auction hall, where boxes are placed on the floor for viewing by buyers. Auctions, reserved for wholesalers, traders, and fishmongers, take place at 5:00 a.m.

Since January 1995, the traditional auctioneer has been replaced by a mobile electronic auction system operated by two agents responsible for conducting descending-price sales and managing transactions. The computerized system is connected to the auction management office and processing workshops via the Internet. Each sale displays on screen the buyer’s name, purchase price, lot number, and vessel name. Lots that do not meet the minimum annual price are withdrawn from sale. Since January 2012, a remote electronic auction system has enabled buyers to participate online, with purchase limits determined by a security deposit paid before the auction.

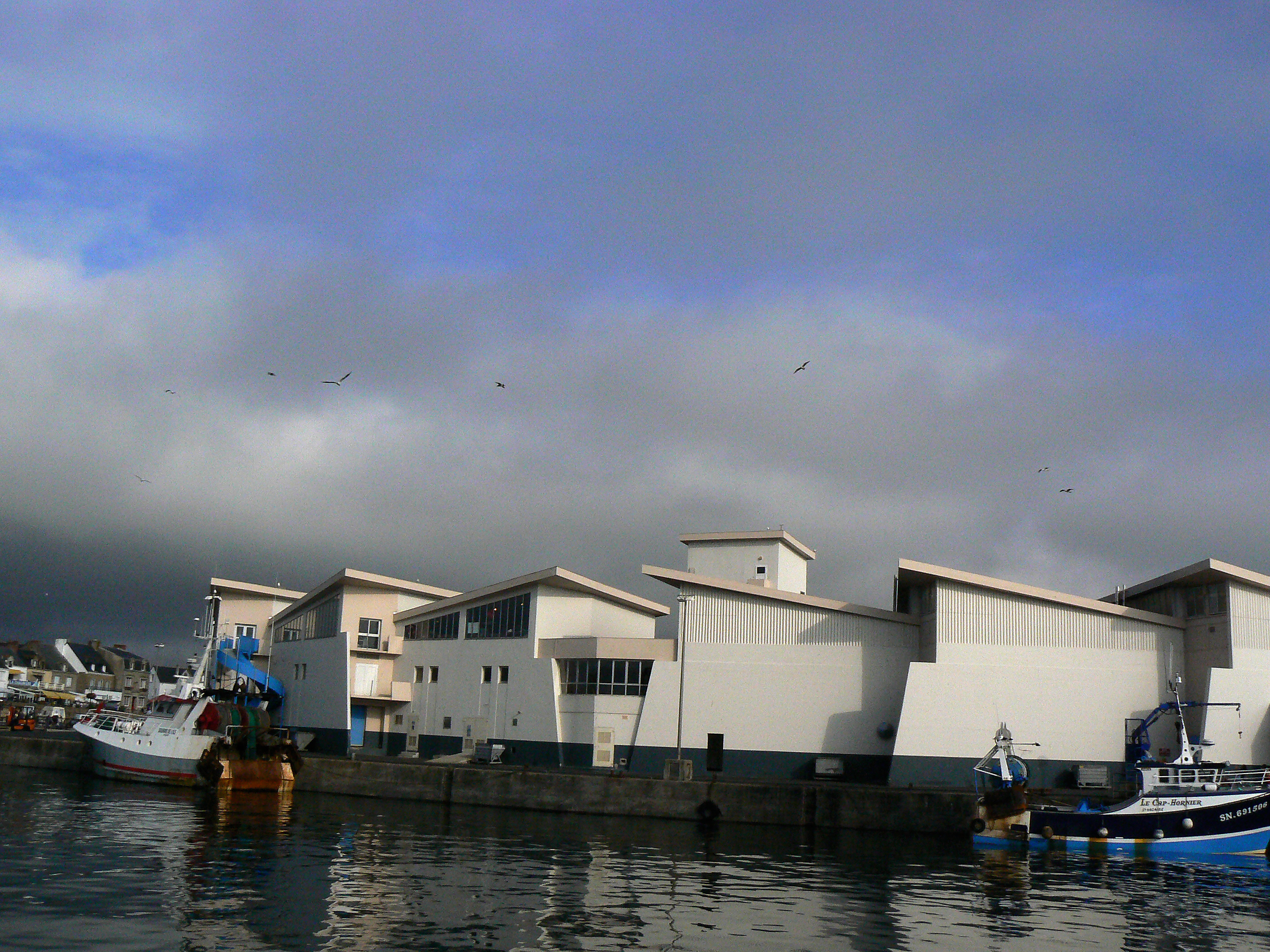
Fish market at the port of La Turballe.

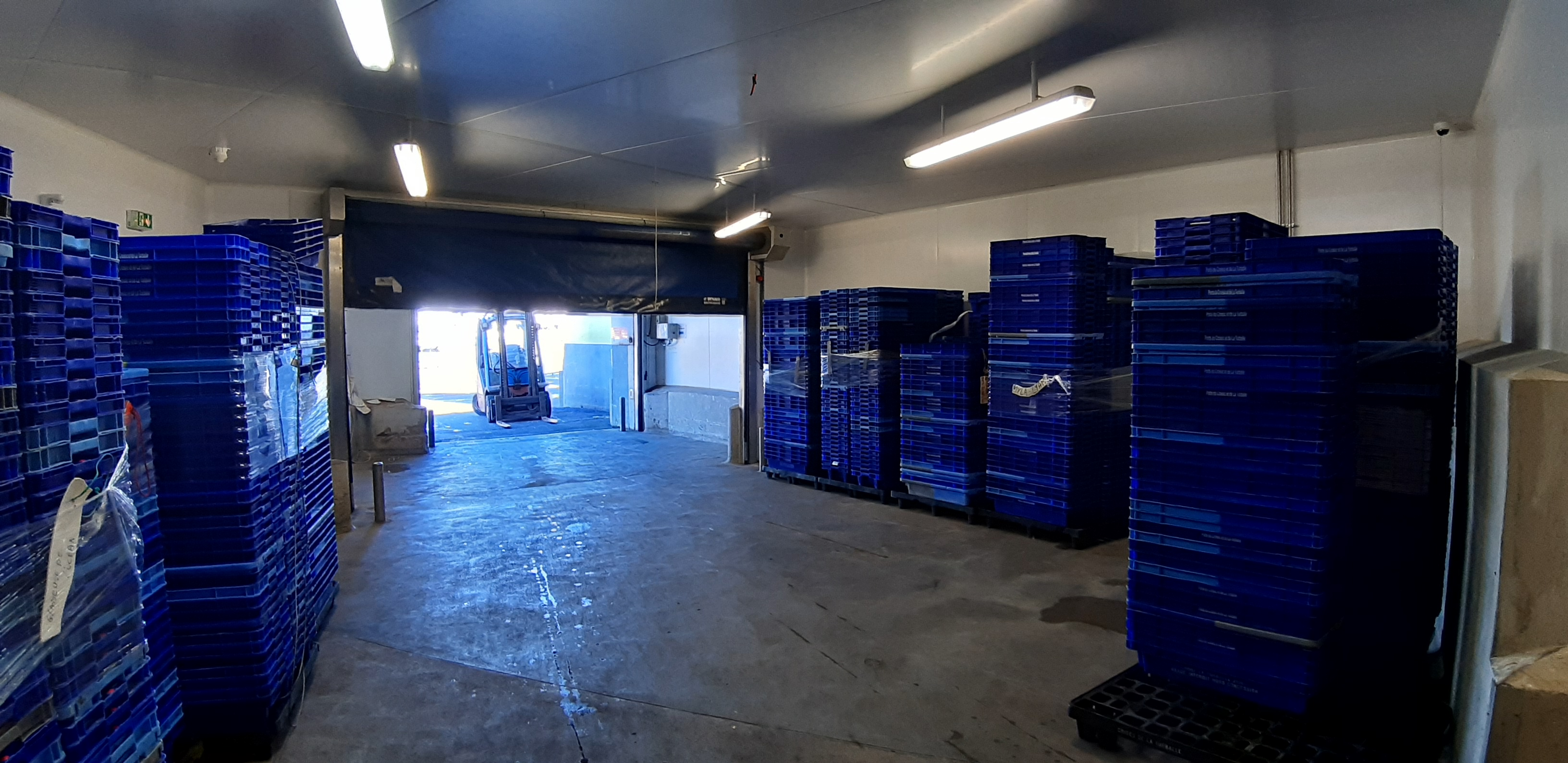
Entrance to the weighing room.

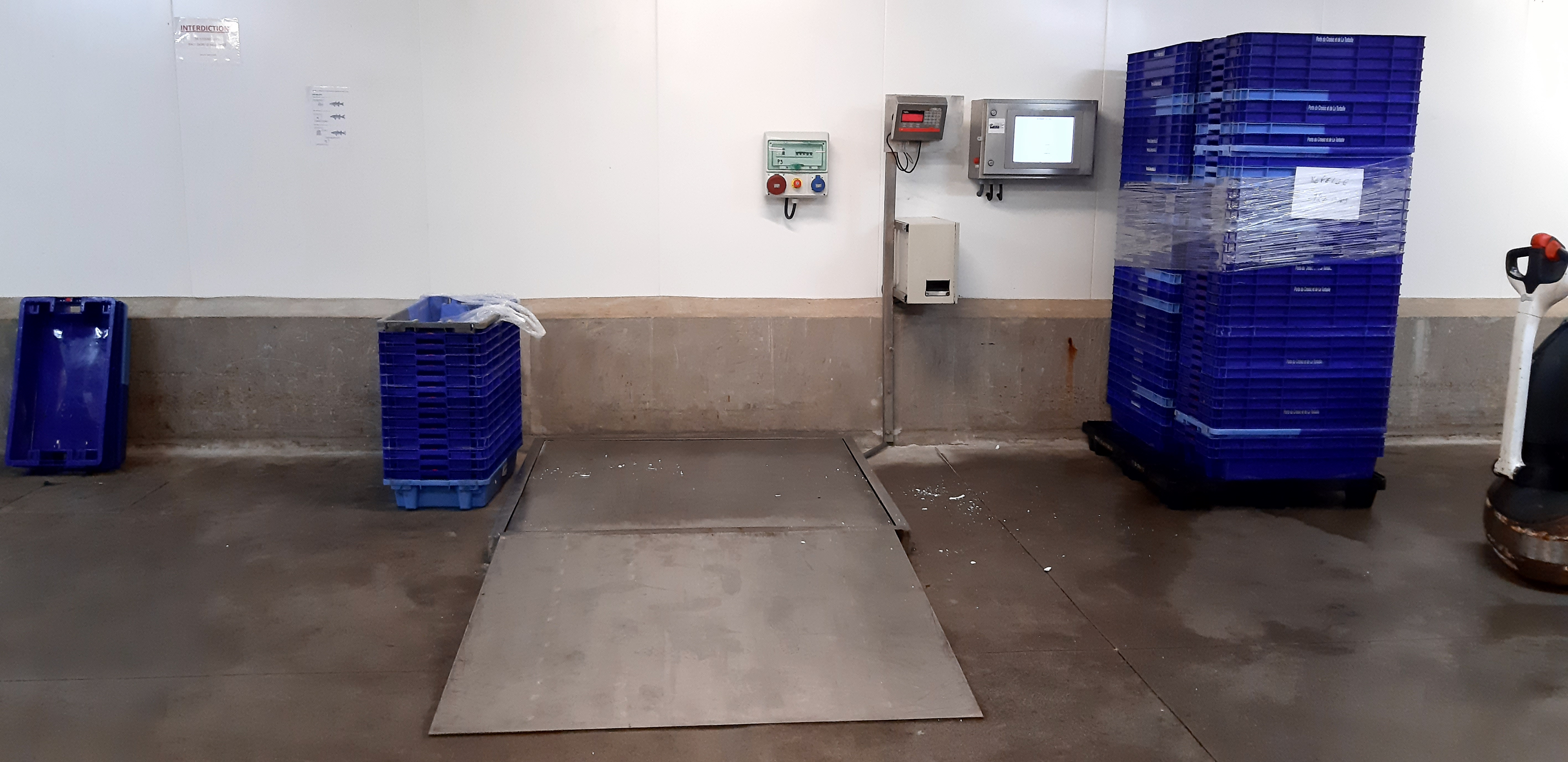
Scales in the weighing room.

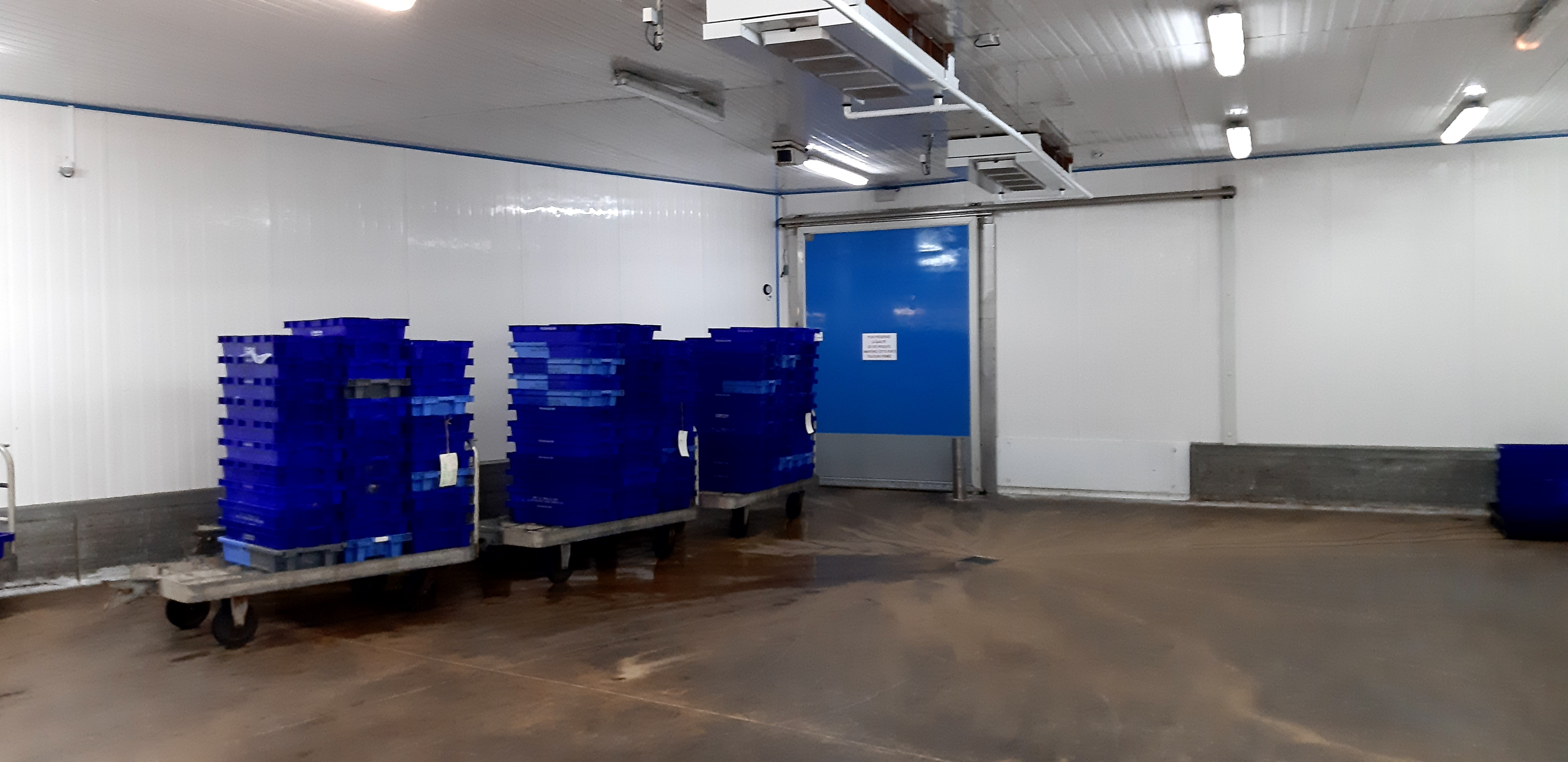
Storage in cold room (+2 °C).

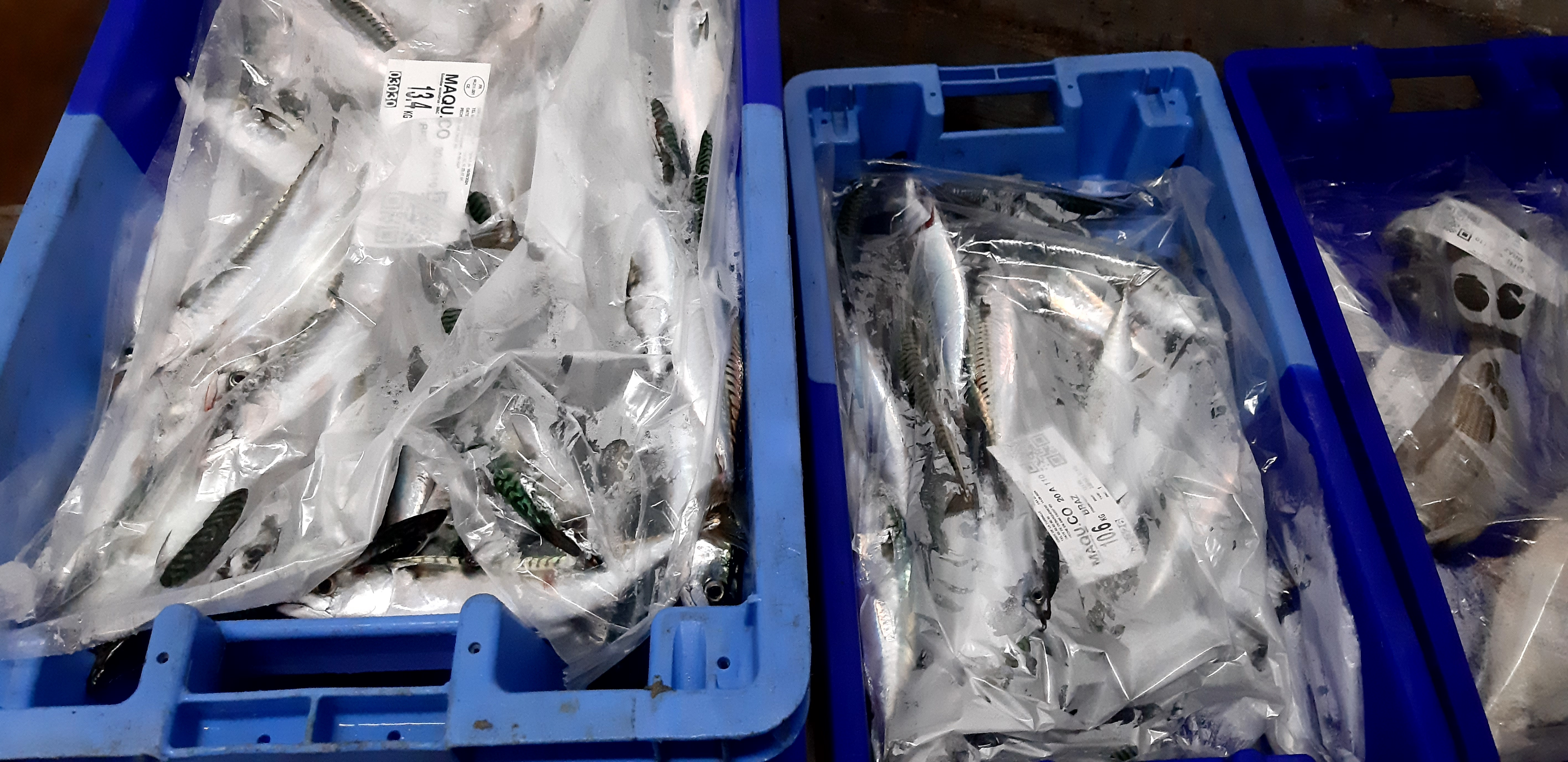
Fish stored in cold room after weighing and labeling.

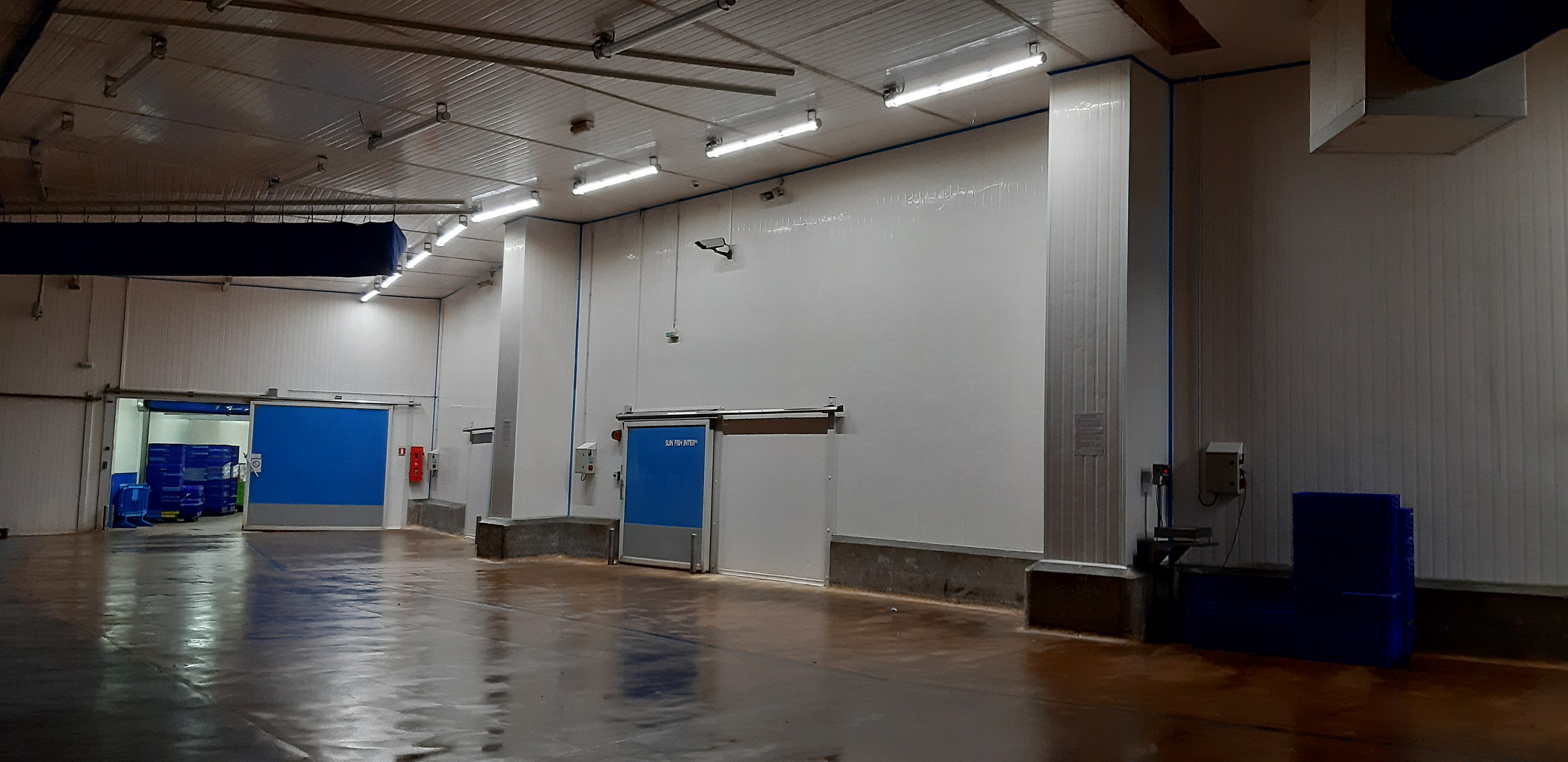
Sales hall (between +7 °C and +8 °C).

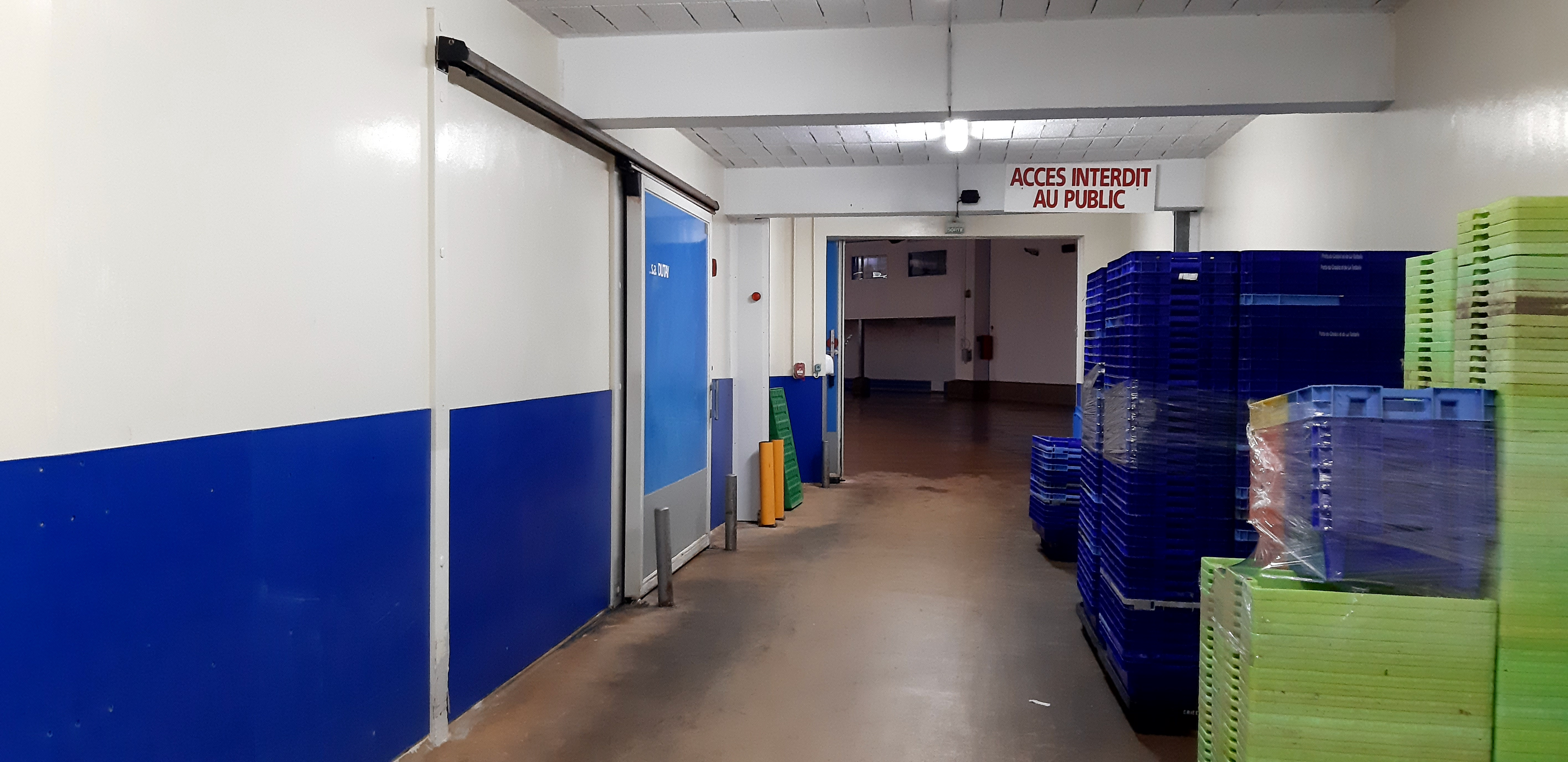
Corridor leading to the fishmongers' workshops.

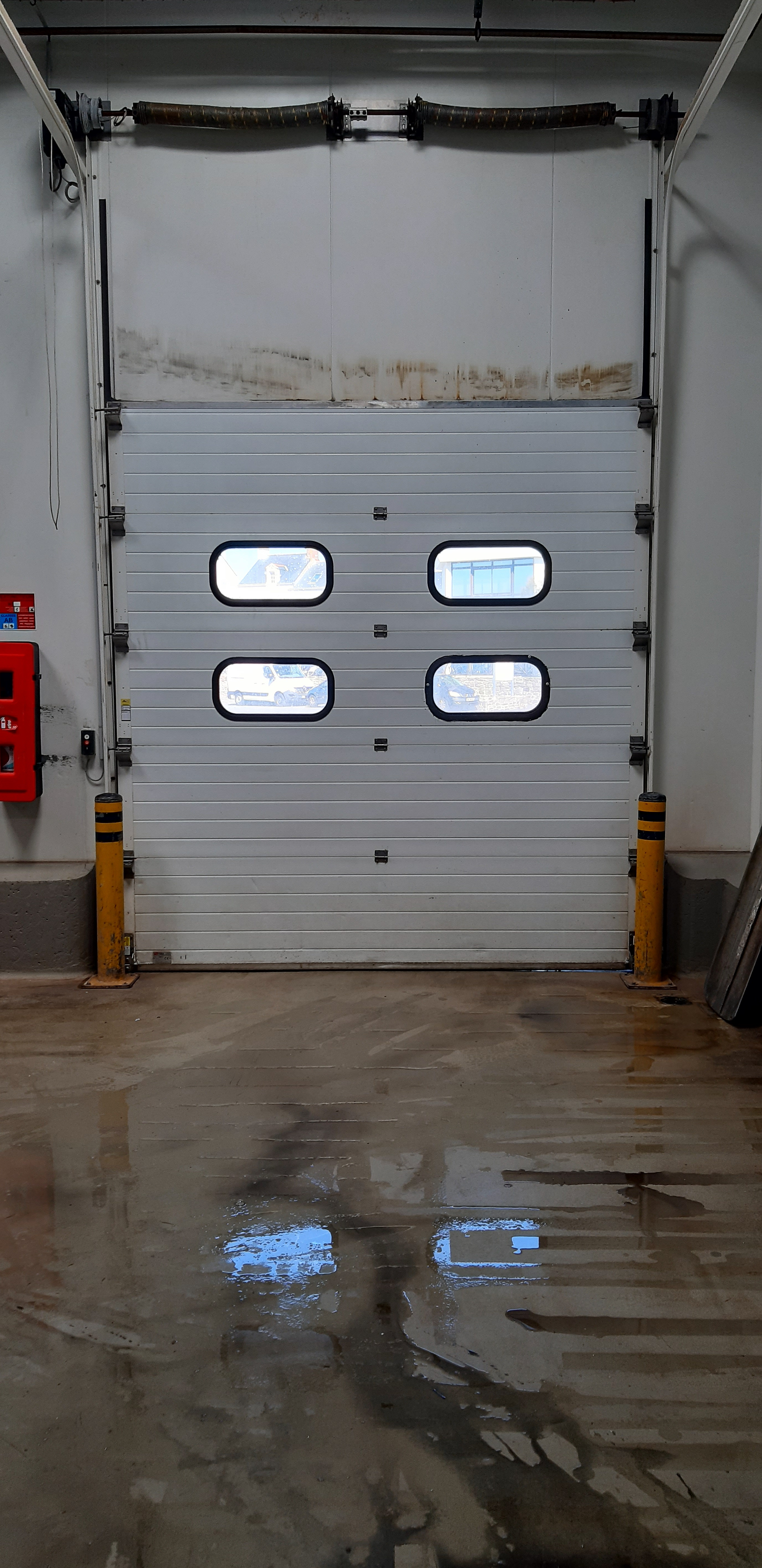
Truck loading bay.

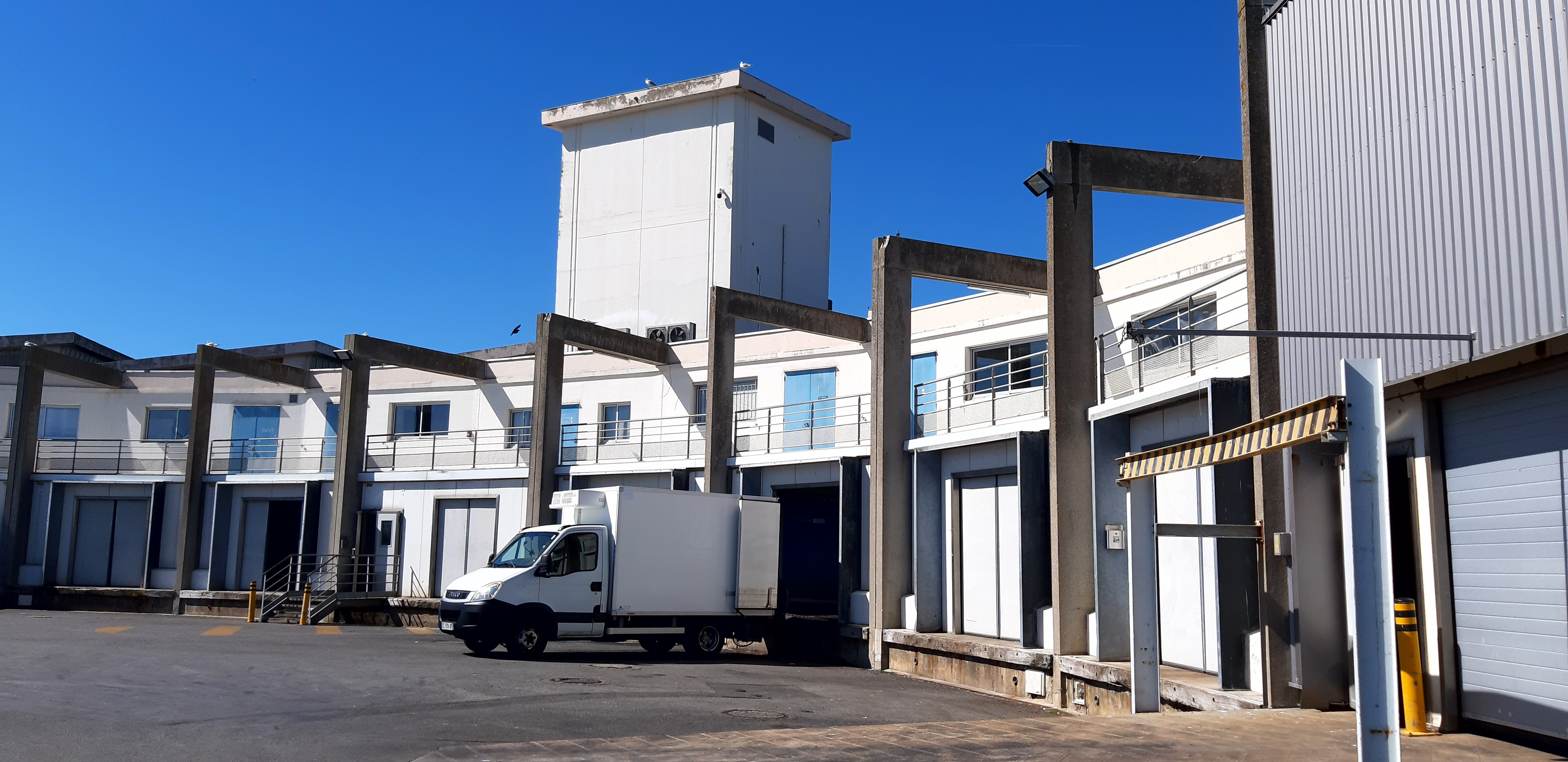
Loading a refrigerated truck and ice tower at the fish auction.

=== Fish trade ===
The fish trader is the intermediary between fishermen and wholesalers. The trader purchases seafood in bulk at fish auctions and maintains regular contact with clients, adjusting communications according to daily arrivals. During the auction, the trader calculates profit margins and communicates selling prices directly to clients. Additionally, the trader oversees the tracking of sales through the packaging, wrapping, and shipping processes, while ensuring adherence to the time-sensitive requirements of the cold chain.

The fish trading company operates a shop or processing workshop within the seafood center. The workshop receives raw materials from the auction and, according to client orders, sorts, weighs, grades, ices, and packs the fish in polystyrene boxes. The products are then transported in refrigerated trucks to clients in France, including national wholesale markets (national markets in Nantes, Rungis, etc.), or to destinations within the European Union.

Goods leaving the port of La Turballe are labeled in accordance with European standards. Each box bears a freshness label indicating the shipping date, the sender’s name, the approval number, and the vessel name. Fish traders in La Turballe primarily obtain their products from the port, though some also source from other ports in Charente-Maritime, Brittany, or Normandy.

=== Ship repair ===
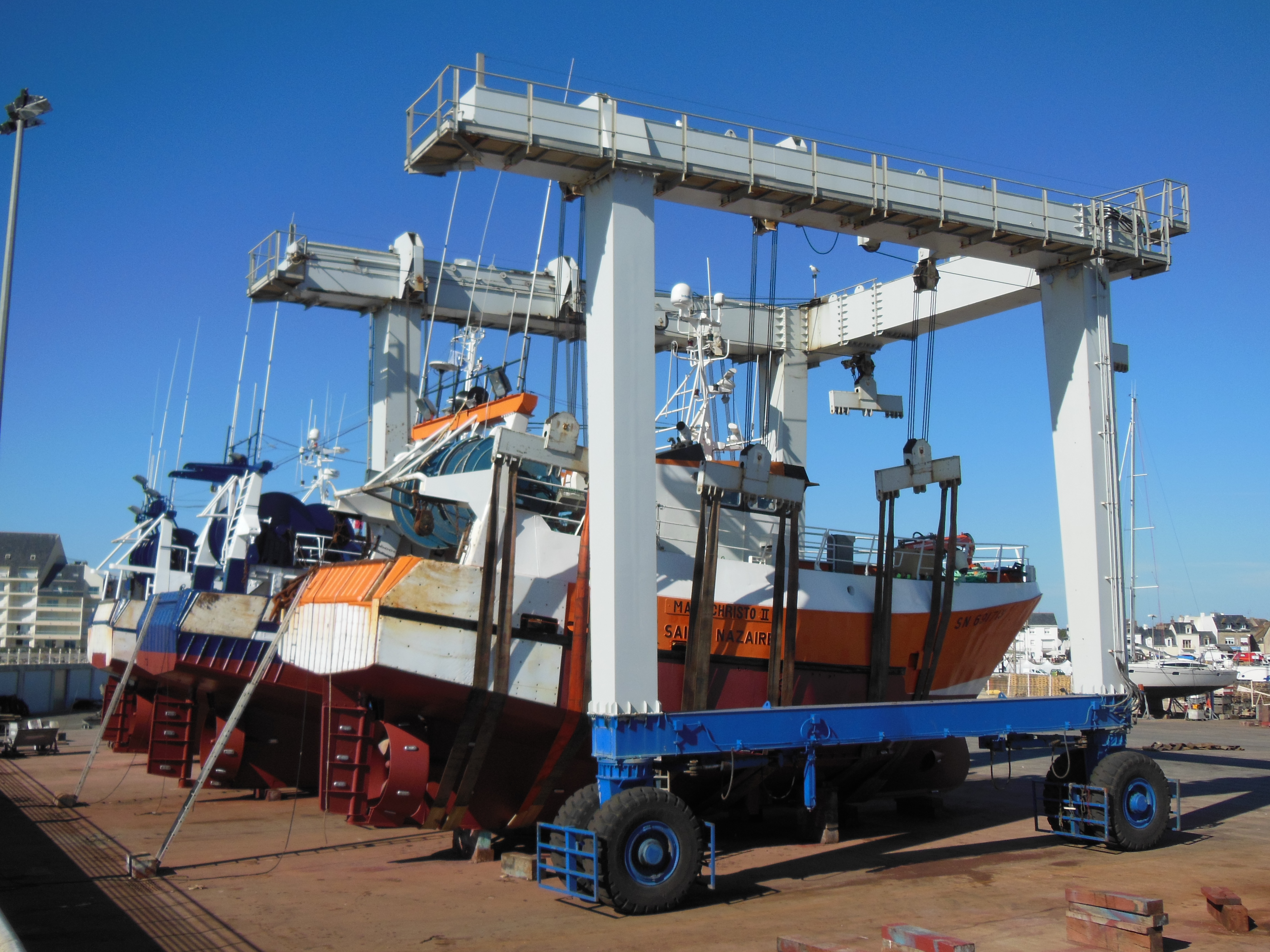
Self-propelled lift carrying fishing boats

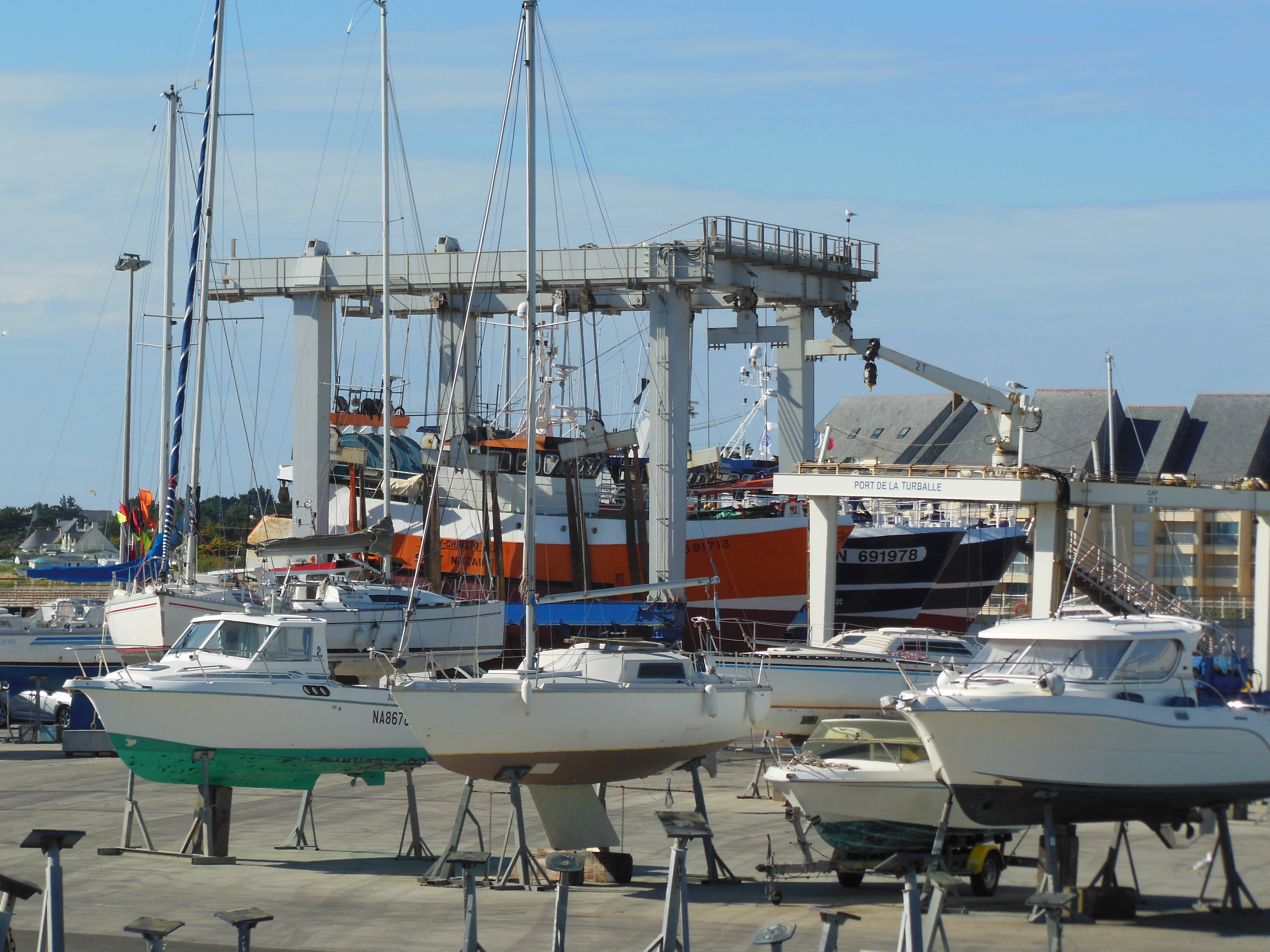
Hull maintenance for pleasure boats

Careening operations, which involve painting or maintenance of fishing and recreational boats, are primarily conducted in May. In 1991, a storm gate, the only one of its kind in France, was installed to protect the Garlahy basin, where the largest fishing vessels dock, from swells originating from the southwest. The barrier contributes to the safety of sailors and their equipment.

The self-propelled boat lift operates at the Garlahy dockyard. It is equipped with four twin wheels, including two rear-driven wheels, a hydraulic engine, and a lifting capacity of 260 tons. The lift uses straps to cradle the hull of a vessel, performing hoisting, launching, and transport operations to the careening area for maintenance or drying. Its operation involves a driver in the control cabin and a ground operator to guide the maneuver, which typically lasts between one and one and a half hours.

== History ==
=== Origins ===
Sardine fishing has been a traditional activity in the bay of Le Croisic. The first recorded mention of a fishing boat in the port of La Turballe dates to 1656. In the mid-17th century, the local waters provided regular catches during sardine migration periods, supporting the livelihoods of the small number of fishing families in the hamlet, which was then located at the western tip of Guérande. Limited preservation and transportation methods initially confined the market for the catch to the local area.

The first fish preservation technique, known as preservation by pressing, was introduced from southern France. Sardines were washed, dried, pressed to extract oil, smoked, salted, and stored in wooden barrels. This method allowed the fish to be preserved for seven to eight months and transported to southern France. Subsequently, many sardine presses were established along the Breton coast.

The development of canning, or appertisation, transformed fish preservation. This process was developed by Parisian confectioner Nicolas Appert in 1795, who commercialized food sealed in airtight glass containers and boiled, allowing it to be preserved for several years. The tin can was later introduced. In 1810, Joseph Colin, a confectioner from Nantes, applied these techniques to sardines, packaging them on an artisanal scale in small tin-plated iron cans with soldered lids, creating the “sardine à la nantaise.”

His son, Pierre-Joseph Colin, fifteen years later, began industrial-scale production and in 1825 founded the world’s first sardine cannery on Rue des Salorges in Nantes. He developed the method of packing sardines tightly together in a bath of oil, establishing the technique of preserving sardines in oil. The cans were round, made of tinplate, soldered, and sealed with a copper plate. This process, which ensured both flavor and extended shelf life, achieved immediate commercial success. The first canned sardines in oil were thus packed in Nantes using fish caught in La Turballe, a world first of which the small port was likely unaware.

At the time, communication between the port of La Turballe and Nantes was limited, and in the absence of a railway, Pierre-Joseph Colin had the fish transported by stagecoach. To ensure a regular supply, reduce the impact of the journey on product freshness, and meet growing demand, tinworker François Deffés established, in 1830, a seasonal facility near the port of La Turballe on the Pen-Bron coastline to supply the industry with tinplate cans.

=== Rise of the canning industry ===
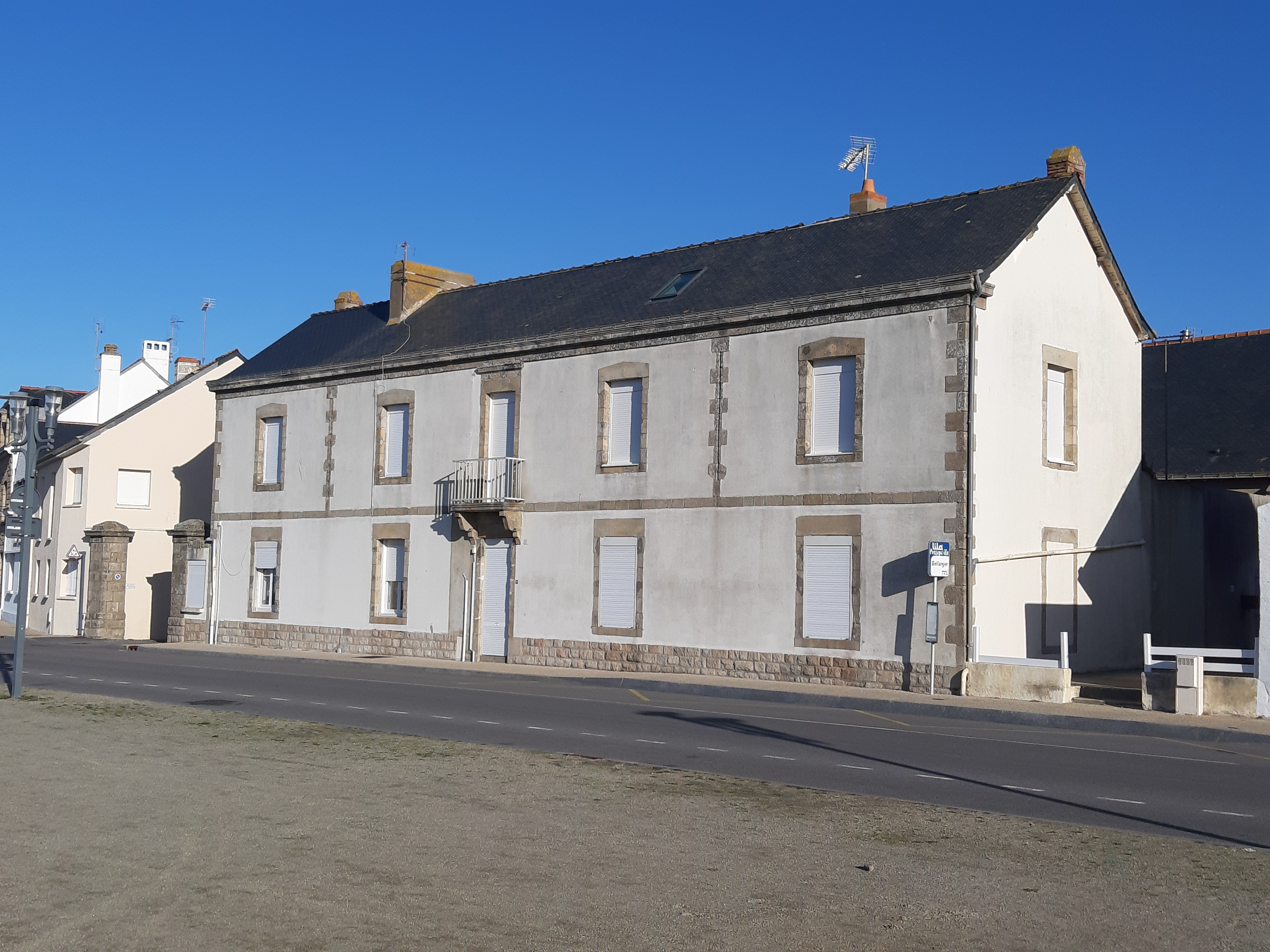
Former Boquien-Bardon factory, located at 7 Boulevard Bellanger

Although the first sardine cannery was established in Nantes, the first cannery located directly at a fishing site was set up in La Turballe in 1824. Research by the association Au gré des vents indicates that seventeen canneries were created in La Turballe, with eleven having been precisely identified, including:

- Deffès Cannery (1824–1878): In 1824, François Deffès, an industrialist from Haute-Garonne, established a cannery at Pen-Bron, introducing the practice of placing sardines into tins immediately after they were unloaded at the port. At the time, the La Turballe fishing fleet included about thirty sardine shallops. By 1847, the factory employed 165 workers and produced 150,000 tins. The cannery was purchased in 1857 by Barathoux.
- Pellier Frères Cannery: Two factories were established on Quai Saint-Paul, one in 1841 and the other in 1878. By the end of the 19th century, it had become the largest employer in La Turballe. The factory was later purchased by Louis Biret and underwent several name changes, including La Catalane, L.A. Price, and Conserverie de France, before closing in 1960.
- Benoît Cannery (1895–1975): The factory, which had several owners and directors over its history (Arsène Saupiquet, Jules Benoît, Pierre Falcone and several directors: Pageault, Lechat, Letourneur), initially produced anchovies. It permanently closed in 1975 and was subsequently replaced by the apartment building Le Grand Large.
- Au Gendarme Cannery (1942–1976) (current municipal technical center): The last factory built in La Turballe began operations at the end of the Second World War. It employed women to process sardines, tuna, hake, and occasionally anchovies. To maintain year-round production, frozen fish such as Mediterranean sardines and Dakar tuna were also processed. A dormitory with fifteen beds was built above the garages to accommodate seasonal workers from nearby communes. The factory was later renamed Coopérative des Pêcheurs Turballais.
- Gravier Factory (1863–1989) (now Espace Garlahy): Built in 1863 by Louis Marie Satre, the factory was purchased in 1871 by the Gravier brothers and expanded in 1876. In 1900, it was acquired by the Mallein family, who also owned a fruit and vegetable cannery in Orléans, allowing seasonal collaboration between the two sites. The factory included a dormitory for seasonal workers. From 1976, it was the only remaining cannery in La Turballe, employing around 80 people, and it closed in 1989.
- House and Canning Workshop (1856–1882): The property, operated by Jean-Baptiste Michel, was sold in 1882 to the Gravier factory.
- Goyen Cannery (near the town hall) (1923–1950): Managed by Olivier de Mauduit du Plessis, the cannery employed around sixty people from May to October to process sardines and tuna. The factory closed shortly after the Second World War. Its manager, Jules-Alexandre Bernard, later served as mayor from 1945 to 1957.
- Simonneau Cannery (1856–before 1879): Founded by a hardware merchant from Guérande.
- Benoît Cannery (second) (1875–?): Jules Benoît converted Fernand Auvillain’s former fertilizer factory, which had been closed since 1864, into a sardine and tuna cannery.
- Boquien-Bardon Cannery (1901–1945) (near the Calvary at 7 Rue Bellanger (Note: At the beginning of the 20th century, several notable individuals resided along the boulevard in La Turballe, including the painter Auguste Bellanger at No. 13 and Henri Bournouveau, the first director of the public school. Another resident, Jules Grand, became known for criminal activities; he was pursued by the police, later captured in Vendée, convicted, and executed in Nantes in 1911.)): The cannery operated until it ceased activity during the Second World War. Gustave Boquien, associated with the factory, served as mayor from 1925 to 1927.
- Pierre Chancerelle Cannery (Croix de l’Anse) (1939–1941)
- Louis Susbielle Cannery (1863–1895)
- Lefèvre-Grandmaison Cannery (1868–1895)
- Louis Ogereau Cannery (1871–1907)

The list is completed by the canneries of Alexis Thimeau (1873), Eugène Chatelier, Pageot (now the Grand Pavois building), and the tinplate manufacturer François Lecourt (1880). These factories processed sardines, tuna, hake, and anchovies, offering a variety of preparations in olive or peanut oil. The coastline of the Guérande peninsula became industrialized, and the canneries gradually replaced the old presses, which had disappeared by 1855.

The sardine canning industry expanded along the coast from Vendée to Finistère. By 1880, there were 160 factories in France, including 132 in Brittany, four in Le Croisic, and later two in Piriac and Lerat. Due to the relatively modest investment required and the profits generated, canners accumulated wealth, and the industry attracted numerous entrepreneurs.

The site of La Turballe attracted industrialists from Nantes and Le Mans due to its abundant fish supply and available land outside the town, which was sold at low prices by the commune of Guérande, to which La Turballe was then attached. Regulations required factories to be located outside urban areas because of odors, giving La Turballe an advantage over neighboring towns such as Le Croisic and Piriac-sur-Mer.

Initially, canned sardines were distributed abroad before reaching the domestic market and were considered a luxury product, sold at higher prices than pressed sardines, which remained available for several more years. The long shelf life of canned sardines made them suitable for military use, and they were widely exported to the United States during the Civil War. In the latter half of the 19th century, the product became more common in the national market and among the working classes, facilitated by the development of the railway.

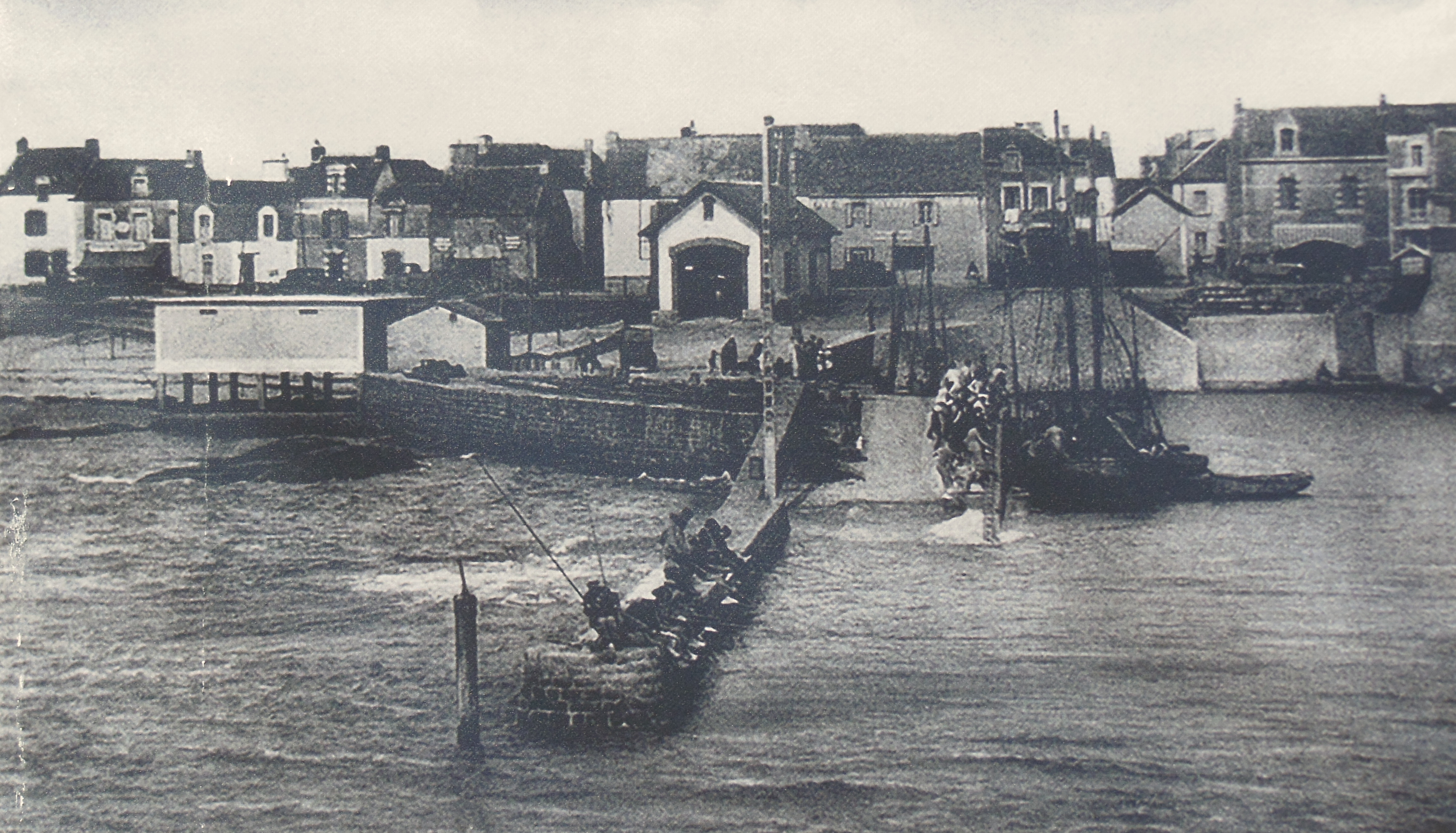
Fishing port in 1875

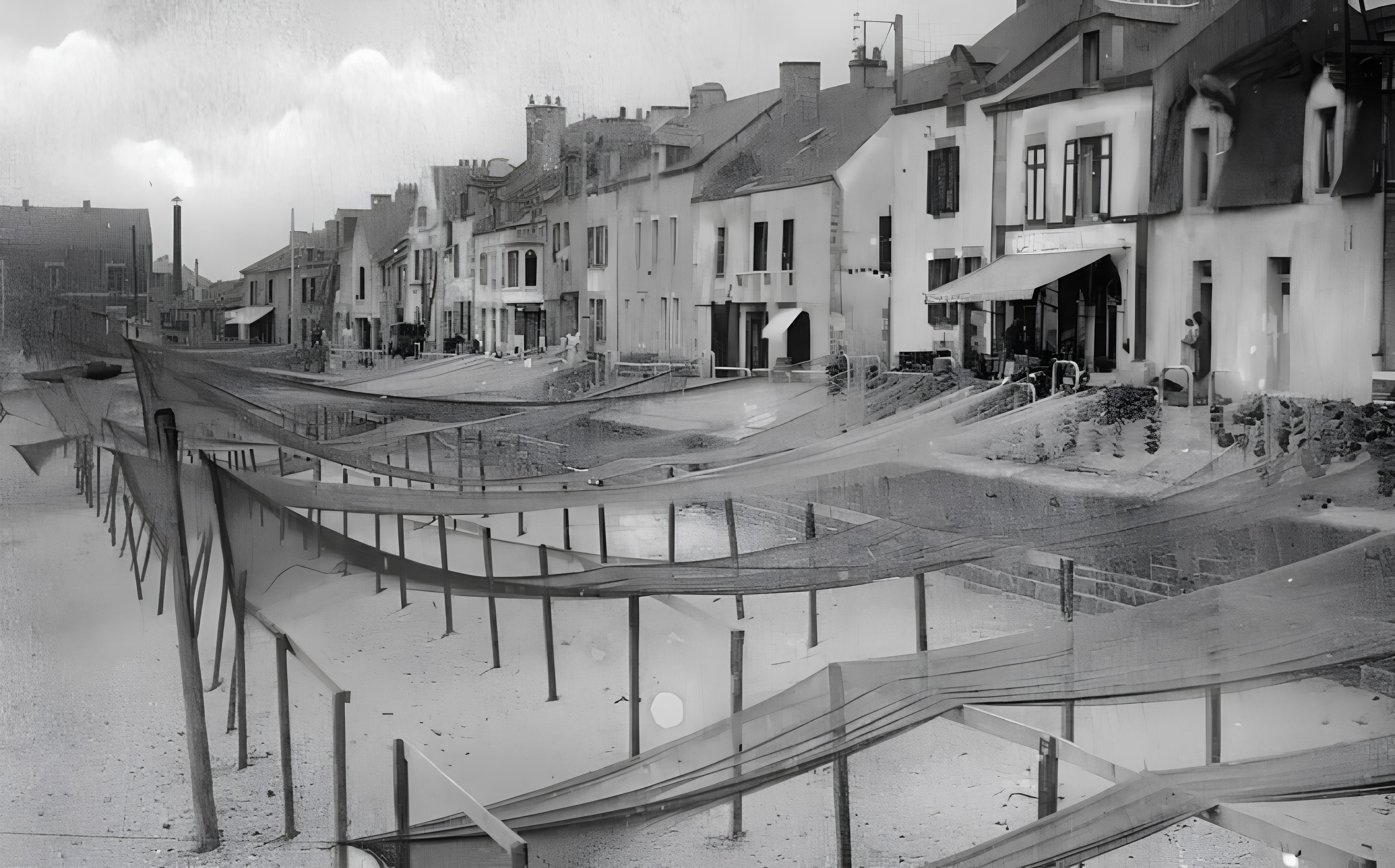
Drying fishing nets at Saint-Paul wharf

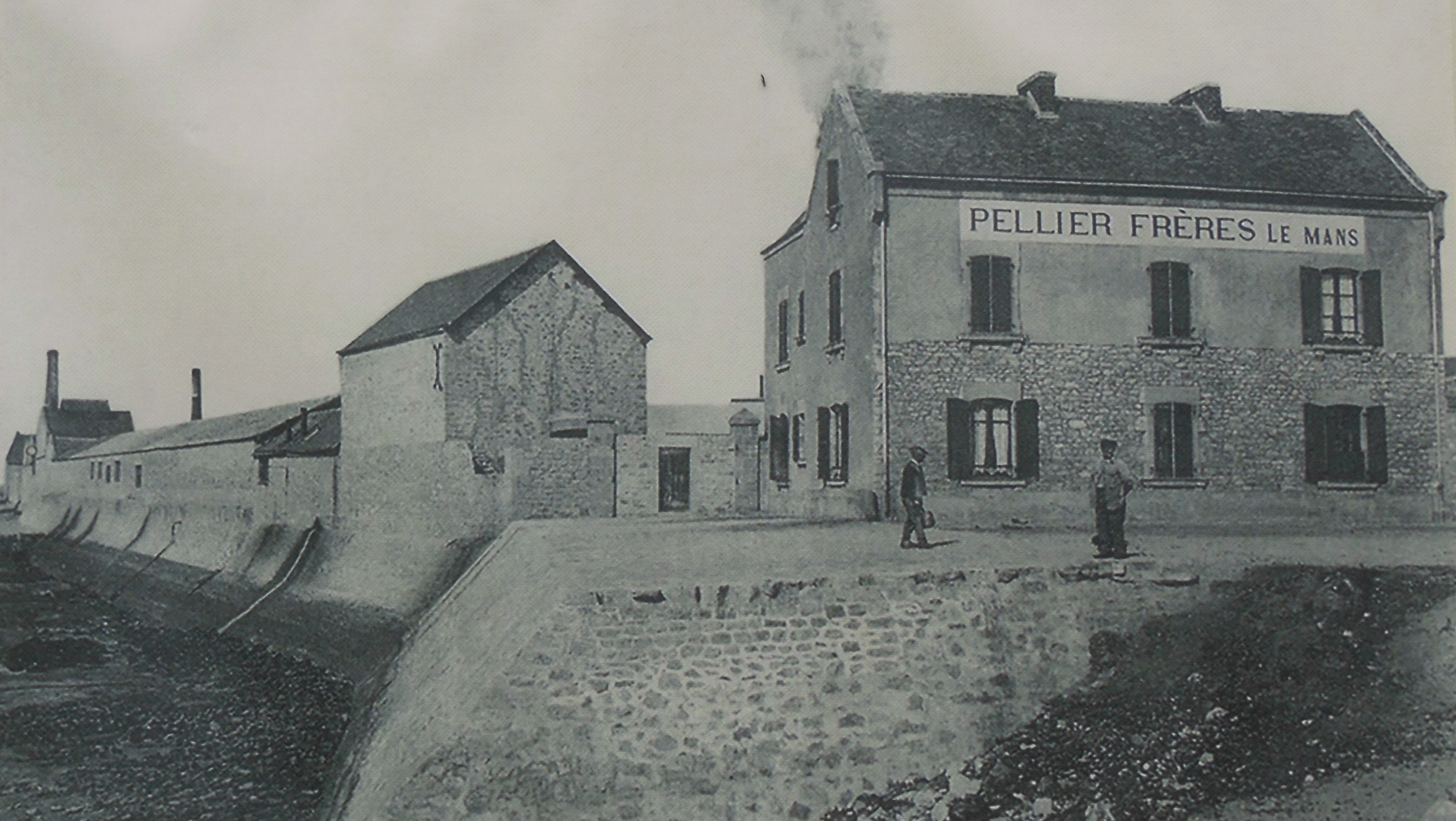
The first Pellier Frères factory (originally from Le Mans) in 1875

=== Economic and social impact ===
Female labor was widely employed in the canneries, typically consisting of young unmarried women or widows. The work involved several stages, including washing the sardines in seawater, salting, beheading, gutting, frying in oil, drying, and packing into tins. The brine used in processing could damage hands and clothing. Work schedules followed the sardine season, with longer hours during periods of abundant fish and reduced activity when the fishing season was poor.

The expansion of the sardine canning industry contributed to regional economic growth, with the local population participating in seasonal work—men at sea and women in the factories. Young men could enter the fishing profession after a medical examination by the Maritime Service, typically starting as ship’s boys at age 14, advancing to sailors at 18, and some eventually becoming captains by acquiring their own boats. The canning industry provided stable outlets for the catch and offered sufficient wages to maintain supply. Fishing shallops were generally crewed by five men and one boy.

The economic growth of the coastal area, driven by the sardine industry and the development of tourism, influenced its relationship with the medieval town of Guérande. La Turballe, initially a small hamlet at the edge of Guérande’s coastline, expanded beyond the historic district of Trescalanand developed into a small town. It was established as an independent commune on May 17, 1865, following the division of Guérande’s territory.

The year 1880 marked the peak of the sardine industry in La Turballe. The number of fishing boats registered at the port increased from 57 in 1857 to 127 in 1877. A survey conducted by civil engineer Bonamy in 1879 reported that the factories collectively produced three million tins annually, corresponding to the capture of 50 to 70 million sardines for the port of La Turballe. The first fish auction hall was built in 1886 by Auguste Sigogne.

At the time, each fishing boat, known as a “chaloupe,” used nets measuring 12 to 15 meters with varying mesh sizes to catch sardines, which were attracted with fish eggs or peanut flour. Until the 1950s, nets were made of cotton and required washing and drying, sometimes on the dunes of La Falaise in Pen Bron. Fishing boat owners paid an annual fee for the use of this section of the maritime domain. Once unloaded at the port, sardines were placed in wicker baskets produced in nearby villages and sold on the slipway of Pleine Main.

=== Development of infrastructure ===
The development of infrastructure in La Turballe began in the 1830s and contributed to the town’s economic growth.

==== Road transport ====
Around 1838, a main road was constructed connecting La Turballe to Guérande, seven kilometers inland, and to the nearby fishing port of Piriac, five kilometers away. In 1871, the State built another route, known as the “salt road,” linking La Turballe through the salt marshes to Le Pouliguen (13 km), Batz-sur-Mer (12 km), and Le Croisic (15 km).

==== Port works ====
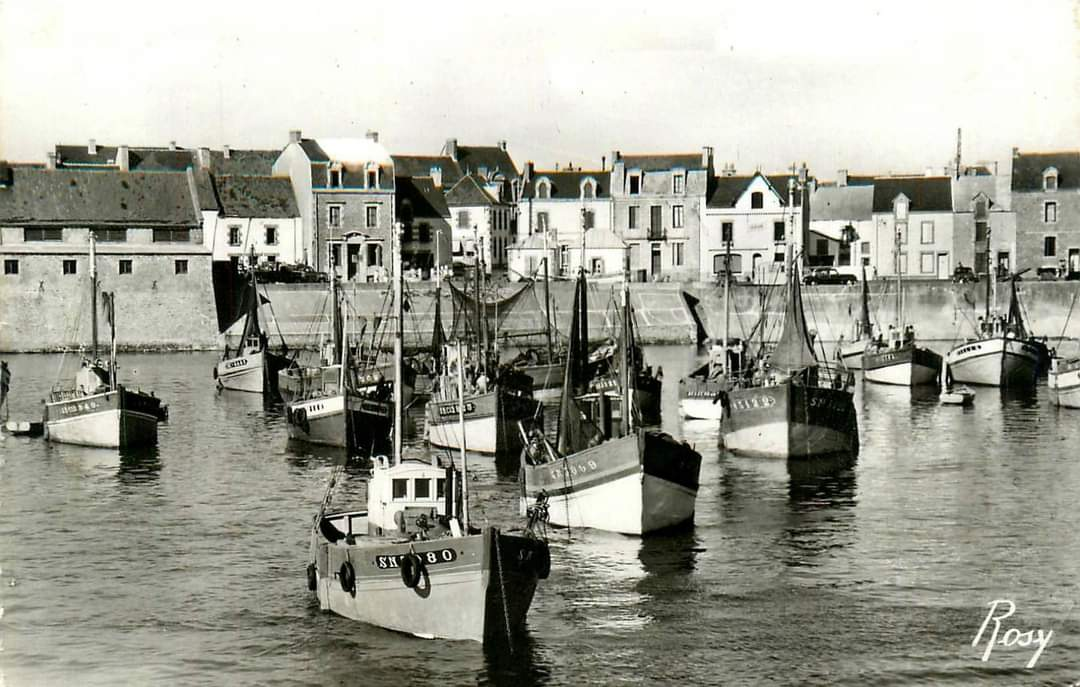
Old postcard of the port of La Turballe at the beginning of the 20th century

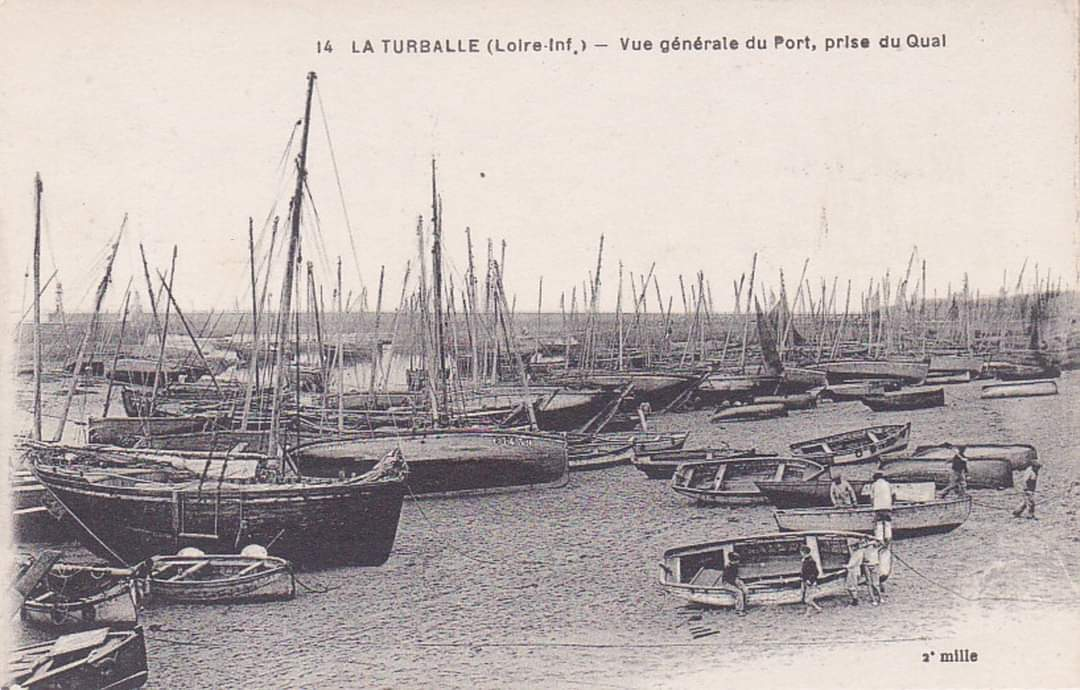
Old postcard of the beaching harbor

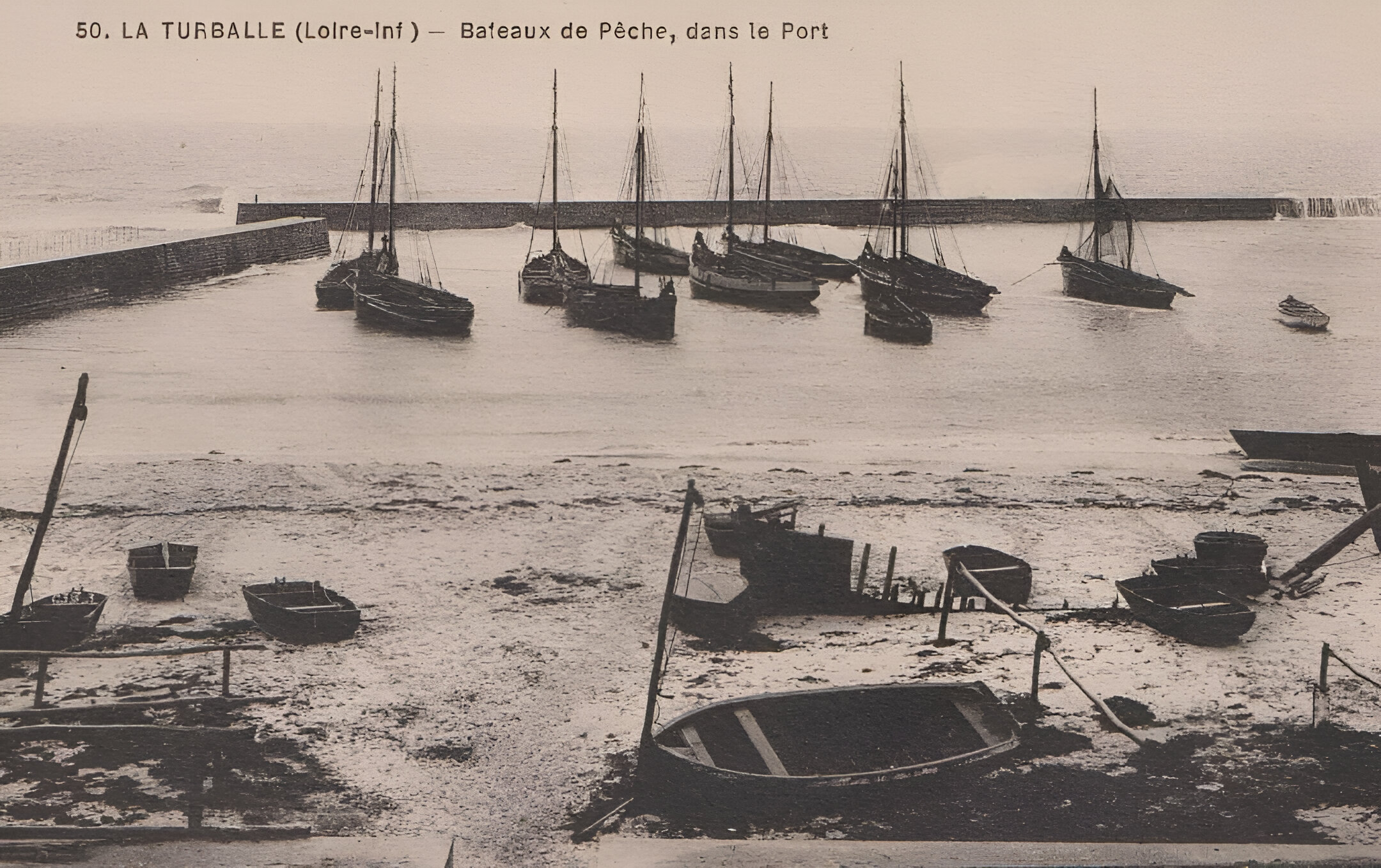
Old postcard of boats on the shore and the breakwater

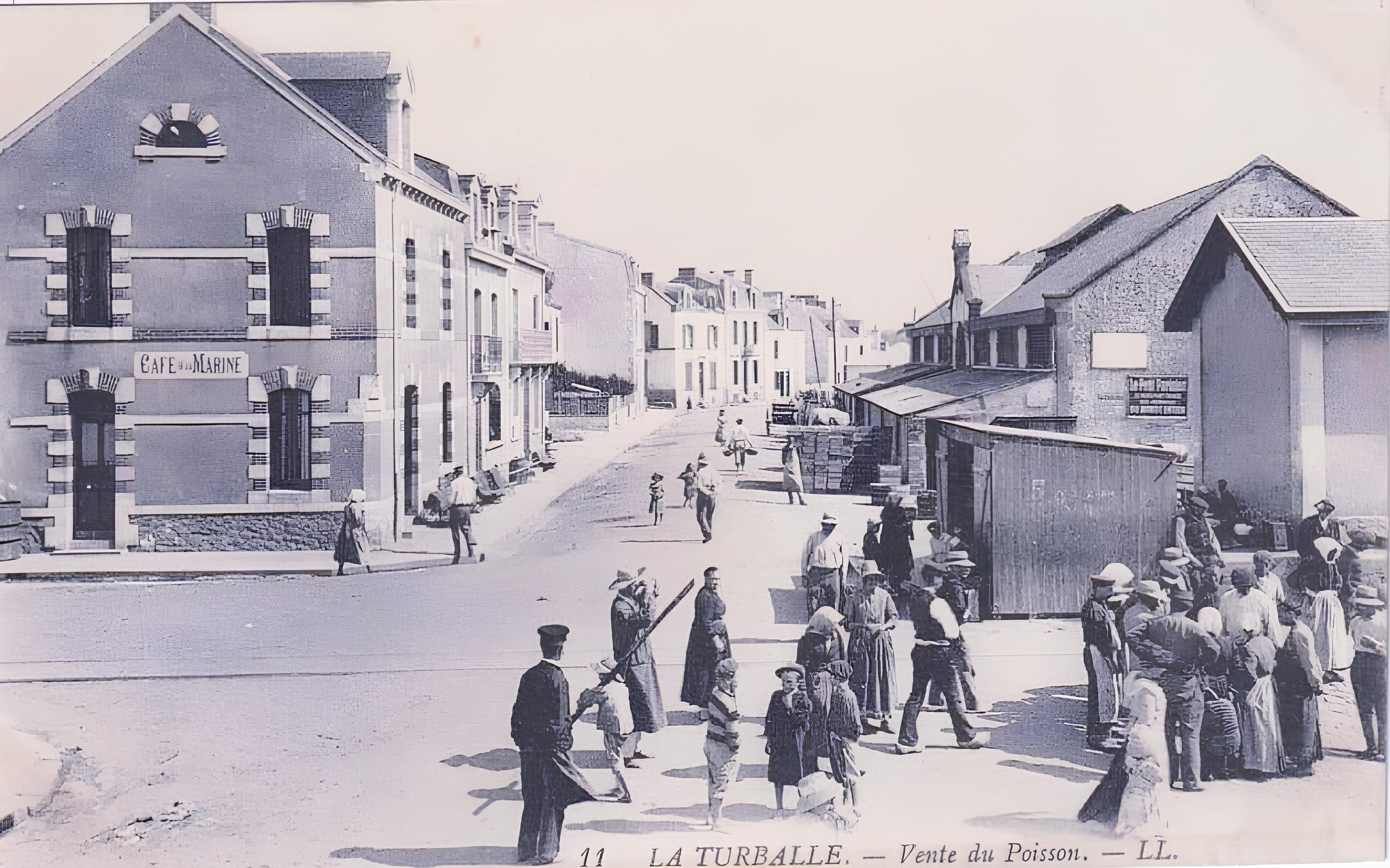
Fish market near the harbor

Until 1857, La Turballe had no formal port facilities. The area designated as the “port” consisted of small coves and sheltered beaches, protected by rocks, and used as grounding sites, including Port Plat, Port Garlahy, and Grand Port.

The first port structure in La Turballe was built between 1857 and 1862, consisting of a breakwater on the Tourlandroux rock based on a project by engineers Jegou and Cheguillaume, approved by ministerial decision. An earlier project proposed in 1838 had been rejected. Due to silting, a groyne was constructed on the Brebis rock in 1872 and later widened in 1989 to provide access to a 21,000 m² embankment with parking and space for fishing equipment. Between 1874 and 1875, a lifeboat building was constructed, and a slipway was built near the Pleine Main reed bed. The first port alignment lights were installed in 1882. The Garlahy jetty, 105 meters long, was built between 1890 and 1894 on the Coëlgny rocks, with the Garlahy lighthouse entering service on September 15, 1894. The jetty was extended in 1956, 1975, and 1979, and a pier connecting the quay to the jetty was built in 1894. The first fish auction hall, Poissonnerie, was constructed in 1895. The southern passage was closed in 1928, and the Marino slipway was created in 1938. In 1958, 800 tetrapods were installed in front of Tourlandroux to break the waves. The old fish market was demolished in December 1970, and a new auction hall was inaugurated. The first dry dock area was developed between 1878 and 1979, with the quays of the Garlahy basin and the new dry dock completed in 1984.

A total of 20,000 square meters of land was reclaimed from the sea.

The deep-water Garlahy basin currently covers 11,500 square meters and includes 270 meters of quays. It was initially protected by a breakwater gate installed between 1990 and 1991, which became unnecessary after redevelopment works carried out between 2021 and 2022 that expanded the port area. The old port, located on the opposite side of the auction hall, covers 12,000 square meters and was deepened in 1989, with 200 meters of pontoons installed.

==== Rail transport ====
In 1906, the Compagnie des chemins de fer morbihannais opened a railway line connecting Herbignac to Guérande. The line operated two trains daily in each direction and facilitated the transport of canned fish, shellfish, salt, and stone. It remained in service until 1947.

=== Decline of the canning industry ===
Over time, crises increasingly affected the maritime population. Due to its reliance on a single industry and limited communication routes, La Turballe experienced greater economic vulnerability than nearby ports such as Le Croisic. This highlighted the need for economic diversification and the development of different types of fishing.

The crisis began in 1881, when sardines temporarily disappeared from the coast. To mitigate losses, some industrialists relocated part of their operations to Portugal, where sardines were more abundant and labor costs lower. As a result, France lost its previously dominant position in the global sardine-in-oil market, which had been concentrated in Finistère, Morbihan, and Loire-Atlantique. Some factories attempted to diversify into tuna and vegetable processing, but competition from emerging Spanish and Portuguese producers, offering lower-priced products, limited their recovery.

Manufacturers responded to increased competition by improving product quality and marketing, while primarily seeking to maintain profit margins through cost reductions. Manual welding was replaced by sealing machines. Two factories in La Turballe closed before 1914, while others continued operating but reduced investments. One of the Pellier canneries was destroyed by fire in 1891 and was not rebuilt; the other closed in the 1950s. The industry’s decline led to a population decrease and a slowdown in construction-related trades, and municipal authorities delayed funding for repairs to the fish market damaged by a 1912 storm.

During the interwar period, the canning industry faced continued difficulties. Major social crises occurred, including strikes that were sometimes violent. In the 1920s, a sardine workers’ strike that began in Douarnenez affected canneries throughout Brittany. At the Penn Sardin cannery, women workers launched a particularly significant strike, which led to an increase in their pay from 16 to 25 sous per hour and secured recognition for overtime and night work, which had previously been disregarded. In response, cannery owners lowered the price paid to fishermen for their catch.

During both World Wars, sardine production in La Turballe was further disrupted. In 1935, the Syndicat d’Initiative de La Turballe and the Compagnie Nantaise de Navigation Aérienne initiated an air freight service to transport fresh sardines to Paris. The route, connecting La Turballe to Le Bourget in two hours, commenced on August 1, 1935, with sardines sold four hours later by street vendors in central Paris. This represented the first commercial air freight service in the Loire-Atlantique department and was piloted by René Marchesseau. By August 25, three aircraft were operating the route, which was later extended to include Le Mans. In spring 1936, five planes flew to Paris and various provincial cities. Despite its initial success, the service ended at the end of 1936 due to a petroleum strike and competition from refrigerated road transport. Over time, the industrial facilities aged, the canneries’ profits were insufficient to fund necessary investments, and the introduction of new refrigeration preservation techniques further contributed to the decline of the sardine canning industry that had shaped many ports along the western coast of France.

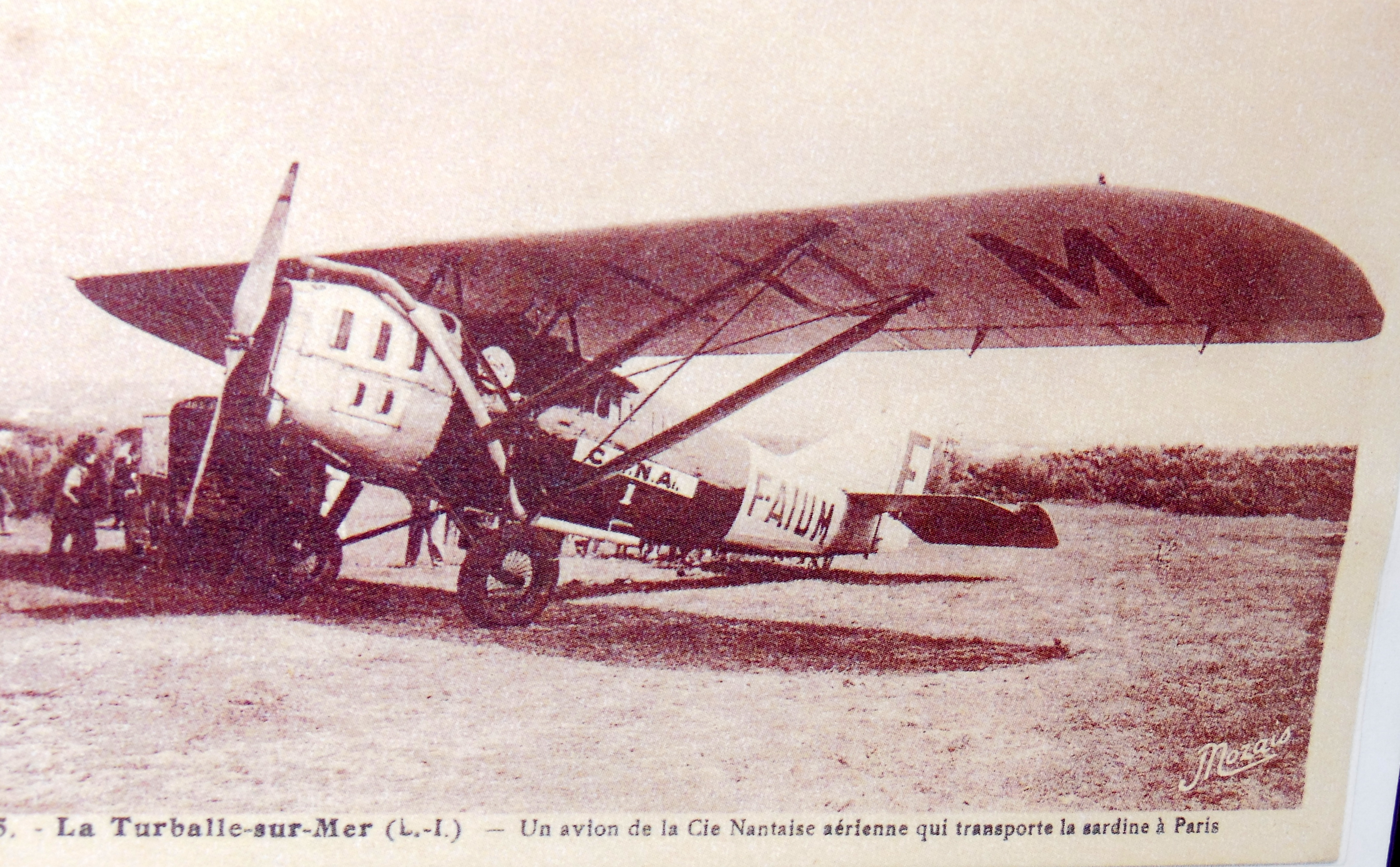
Air link between La Turballe and Paris, sardine freight, 1935

In 1975, the Aimé Gravier factory was the last operating cannery in La Turballe. It ceased production in 1987 and closed permanently in 1989, marking the end of the sardine canning industry in the area.

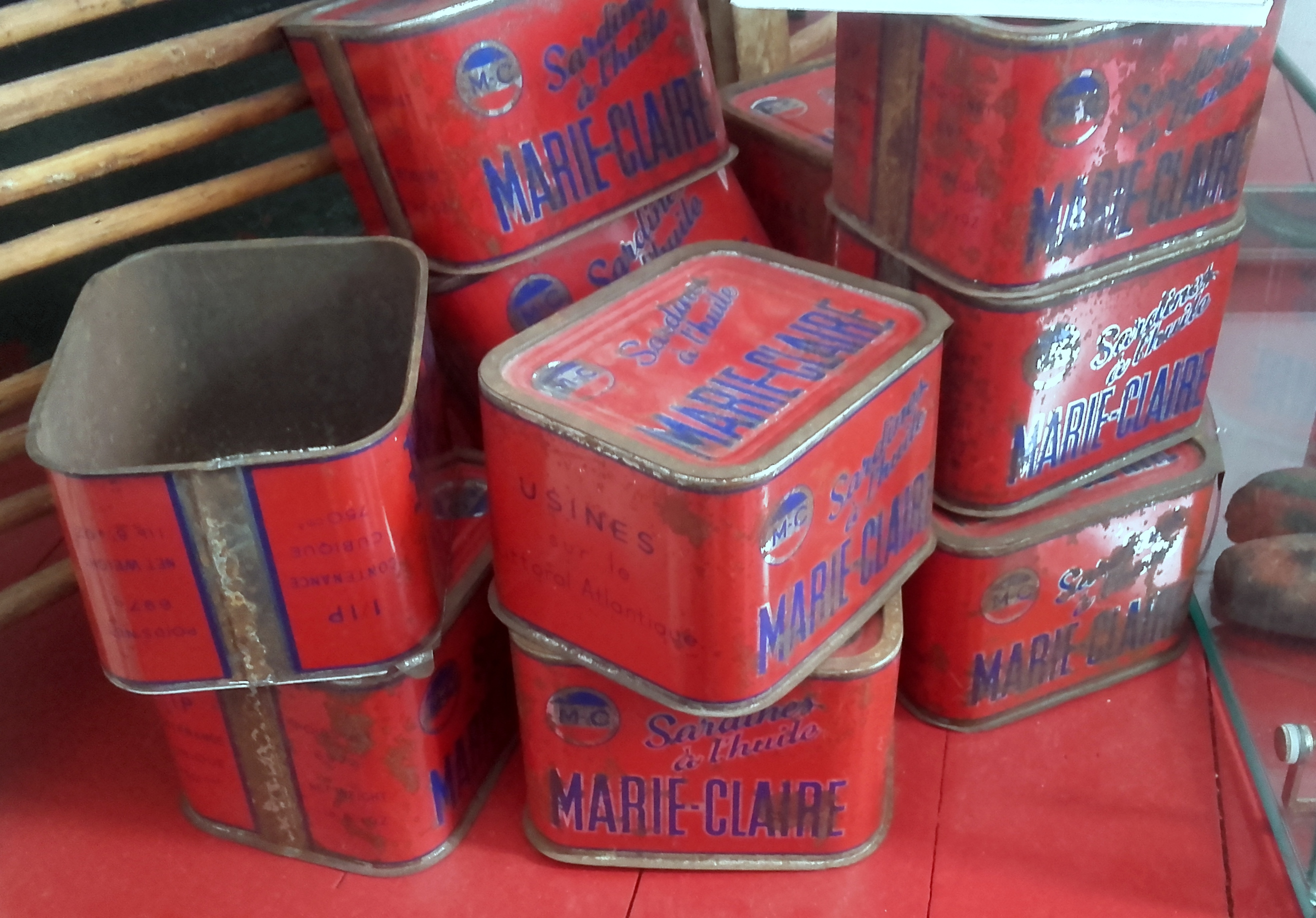
Marie-Claire sardine cans, produced in La Turballe for the army. They were filled at the “Au Gendarme” cannery. They could hold 1 kg of sardines, arranged in 5 or 6 rows (Maison de la Pêche museum).

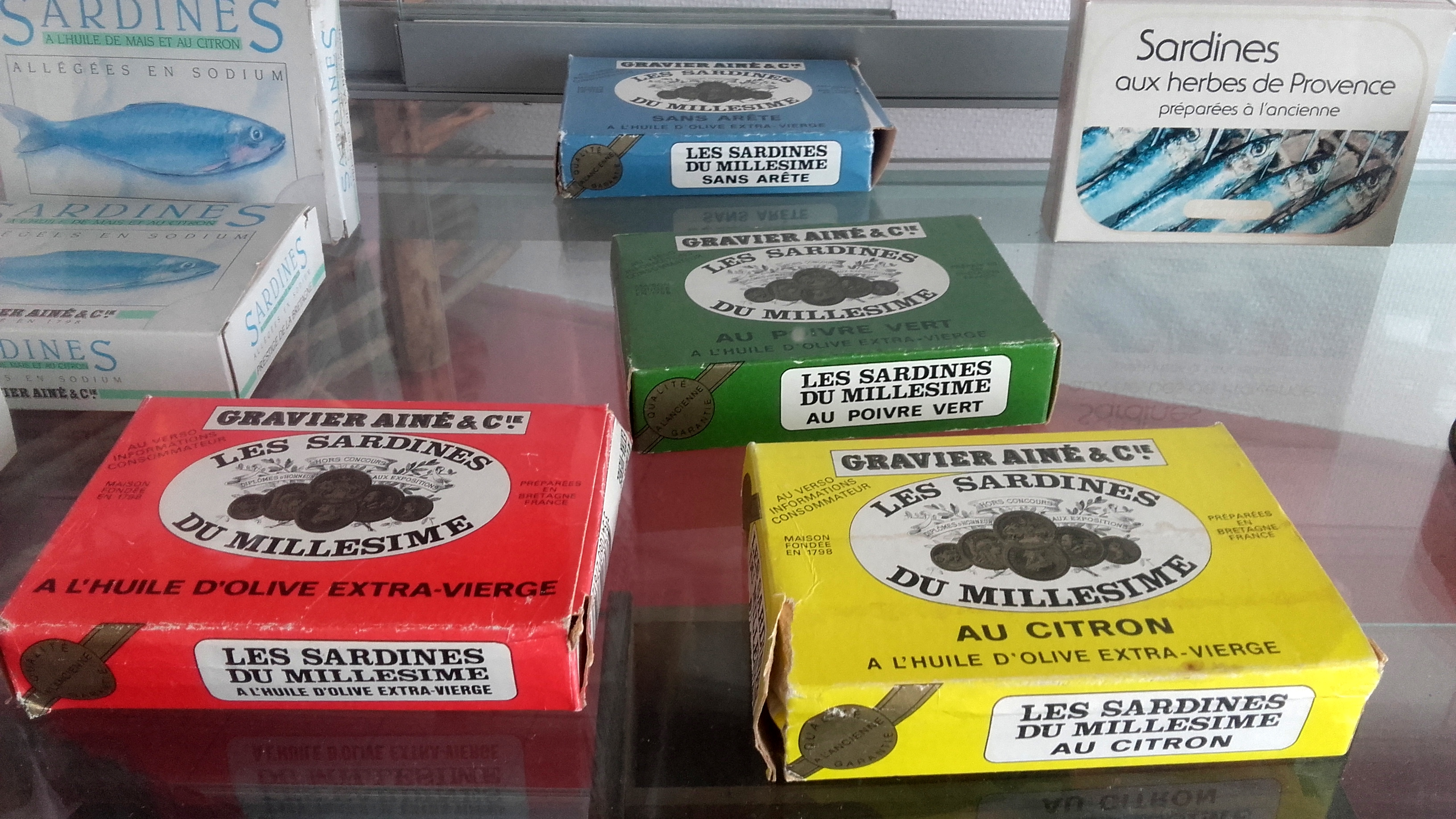
Gravier sardine cans (Maison de la Pêche museum)

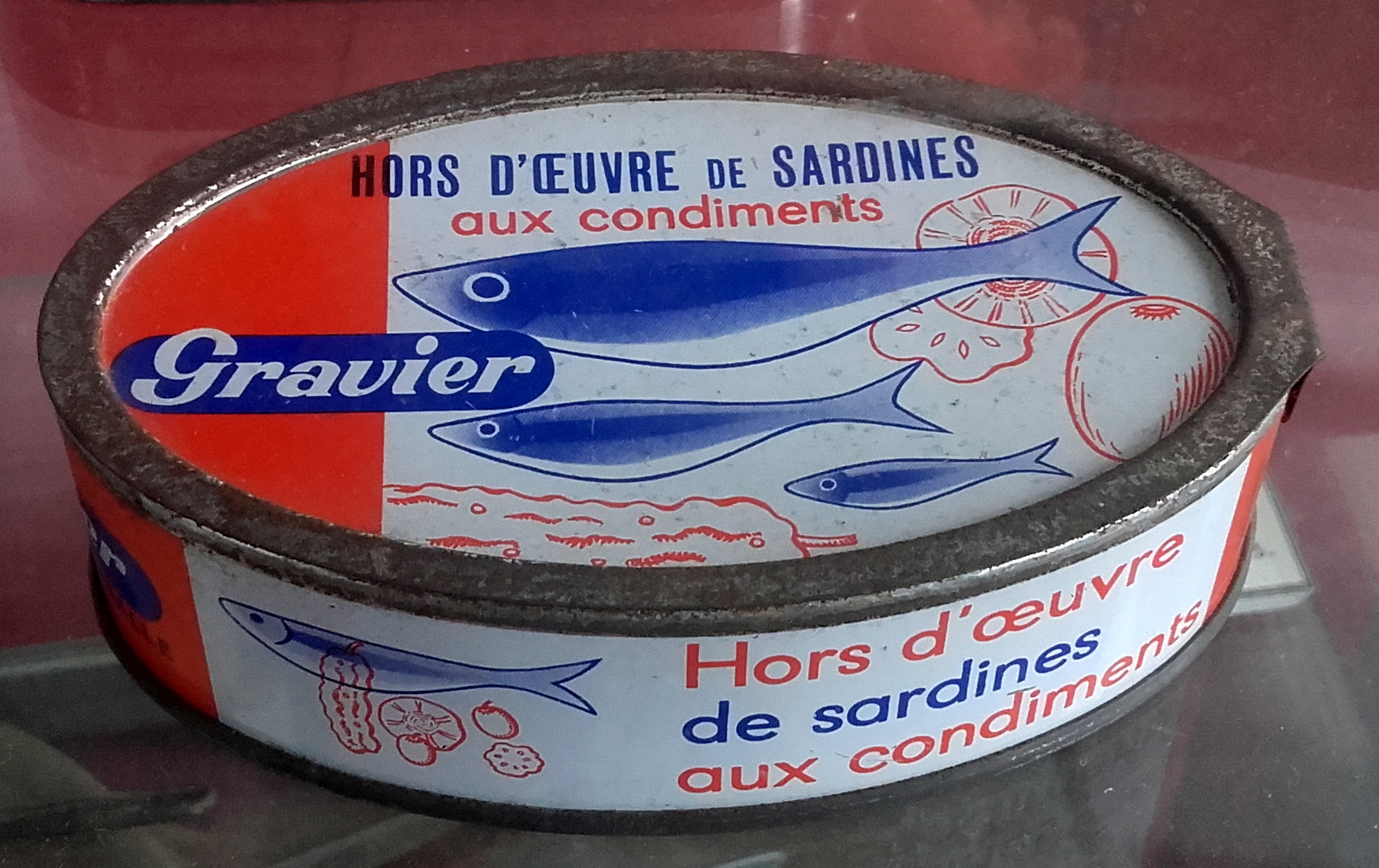
Gravier sardine can (Maison de la Pêche museum)

=== Former fish auction hall ===
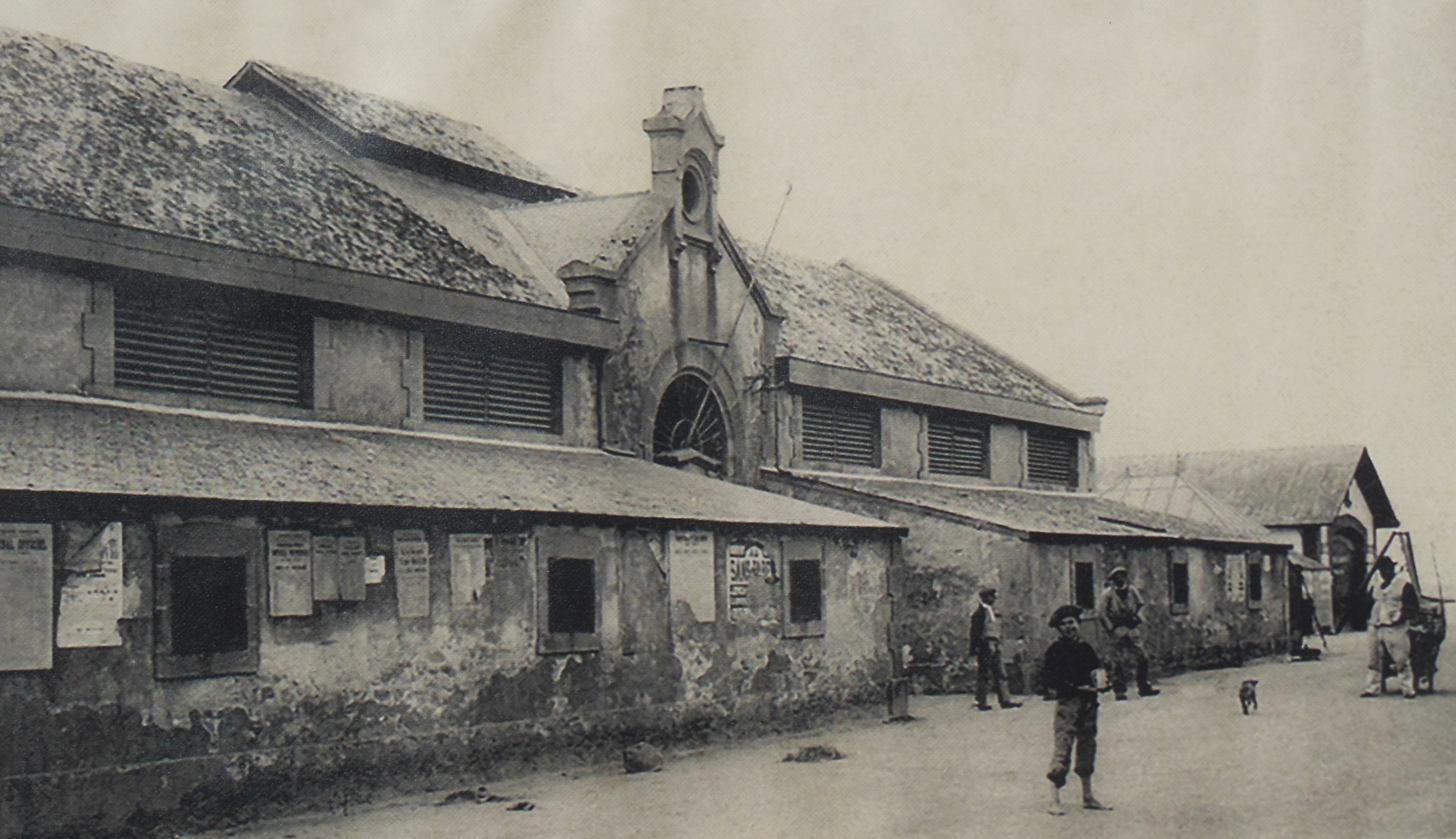
Former fish market in La Turballe, 1895

In 1871, the municipality created a mooring platform to facilitate the unloading of fish, and in 1893, a 105-meter-long jetty was completed to protect the fishing fleet. In 1884, the Municipal Council decided to establish a fish auction hall and requested the Prefect to obtain the concession for the state-owned land on which it would be built. The auction hall, called the “fish market,” was constructed at the expense of Auguste Sigogne, a fish merchant from Les Sables-d’Olonne, who operated it for fifteen years and paid the municipality a fixed annual fee of 1,400 francs. The auction’s operations were governed by regulations issued on December 7, 1895, drafted under the authority of the mayor. These regulations outlined the reasons why fish had to pass through the auction hall for inspection and included thirty-three articles detailing procedures for opening hours, storage, sales, and removal of fish. A bell, located at the entrance, rang ten minutes before the start of sales and twice more when the sales began; this bell is still preserved today in the Maison de la Pêche.

A municipal decree initially required fishermen from La Turballe to bring all their catch to the auction. This requirement was abolished in 1895, leading the Sigogne family to claim losses, as some fishermen no longer paid stall fees. They initiated legal action against the municipality, and following several court proceedings, the keys and management accounts were transferred to the municipality in exchange for 30,000 francs. In 1906, the municipality assumed direct operation of the auction hall.

A series of poor sardine-fishing seasons in 1900 and 1912 severely affected the local industry, leading to the closure of some canneries and financial difficulties for fishing families. The municipality incurred a debt of 40,000 francs. During this period, Spanish and Portuguese producers expanded their output. In 1910, management of the auction hall was assigned to Mr. Michel, followed by several other operators until 1951. Part of the auction hall collapsed in 1912 and was repaired in 1914. During the First World War, fishing continued with reduced crews and vessels. In subsequent years, the auction hall experienced repeated damage from the sea, leading to the construction of a retaining wall along the west façade in 1931.

The auction hall experienced gradual deterioration over the years, with operational issues arising, particularly due to the existence of parallel fish sales that threatened its proper functioning. By 1951, the buildings were found to be in poor condition and in urgent need of repair. At that time, the municipality considered taking over the management of the auction hall directly, and this municipal management was implemented that same year. Some repairs were carried out to maintain the facility. However, on July 9, 1966, the municipal council decided to construct a new fish auction hall, with an estimated cost of 150,000 francs. In December 1970, the original auction hall, which had been in service for 85 years, was demolished.

== Recent economic transformations ==
=== Developments in fishing ===
The port city that had developed around the canning industry continued to grow. Sardine fishing remained active between 1960 and 1975, serving as the town’s main economic activity and supporting both fishermen and canneries. At that time, La Turballe had approximately 25 sardine boats, each employing around fifteen people during the summer season. By the mid-1970s, anchovy fishing became more prominent, accompanied by changes in fishing methods. In 1975, the purse seine was replaced by the pelagic trawl, which increased the net width from 26 meters to 250 meters and did not scrape the seabed. This method allowed a single catch to yield the equivalent of a week’s wages.

During the 1970s, the port was upgraded with new facilities, including deep-water basins and expanded quays. In 1977, the Groupement des Pêcheurs Artisans Turballais (GPAT) was established by Jean-Pierre Raphalen to manage the operations and accounting of the registered fishing boats, each functioning as an individual business. The organization oversaw payroll, biweekly wage payments, general accounting, armament balance sheets, employment contracts, income declarations, and embarkation and disembarkation records. Advances in cold-storage technology allowed fresh fish to be distributed throughout France, and the port of La Turballe increasingly focused on fresh products from both offshore and coastal fishing. Starting in 2005, the fishing fleet underwent reductions, with seventeen boats withdrawn and approximately one hundred sailors affected. European fishing quotas also limited the community’s catch, prompting diversification in fishing activities.

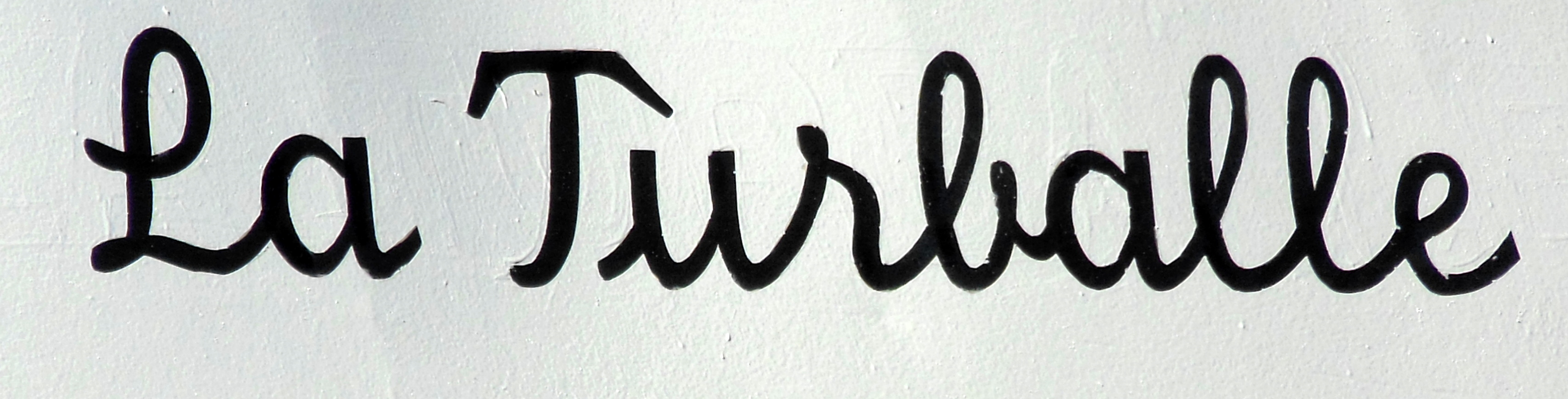
Inscription on the hull of a fishing boat moored at the port of La Turballe

=== Tourism and leisure boating ===
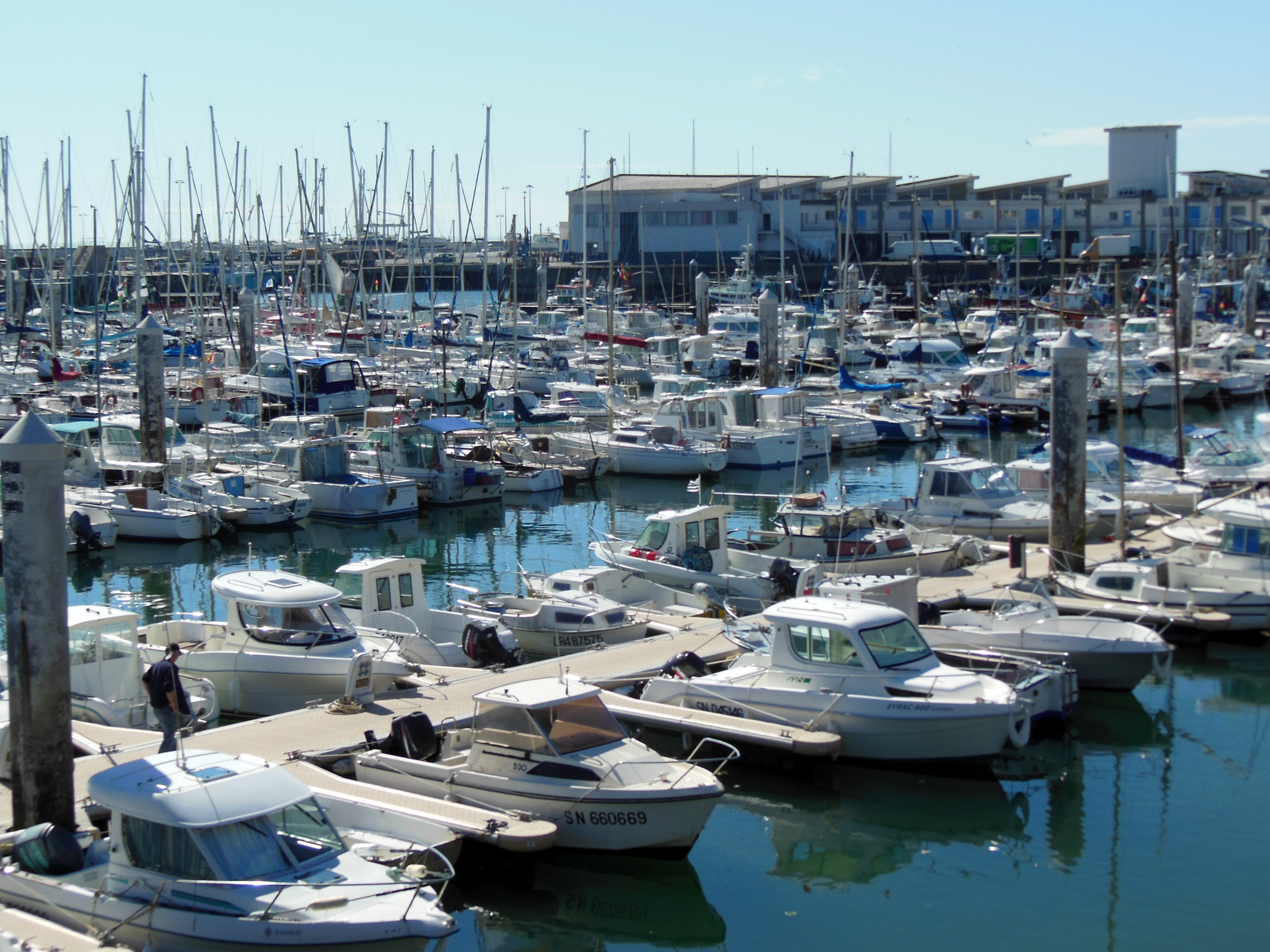
Marina

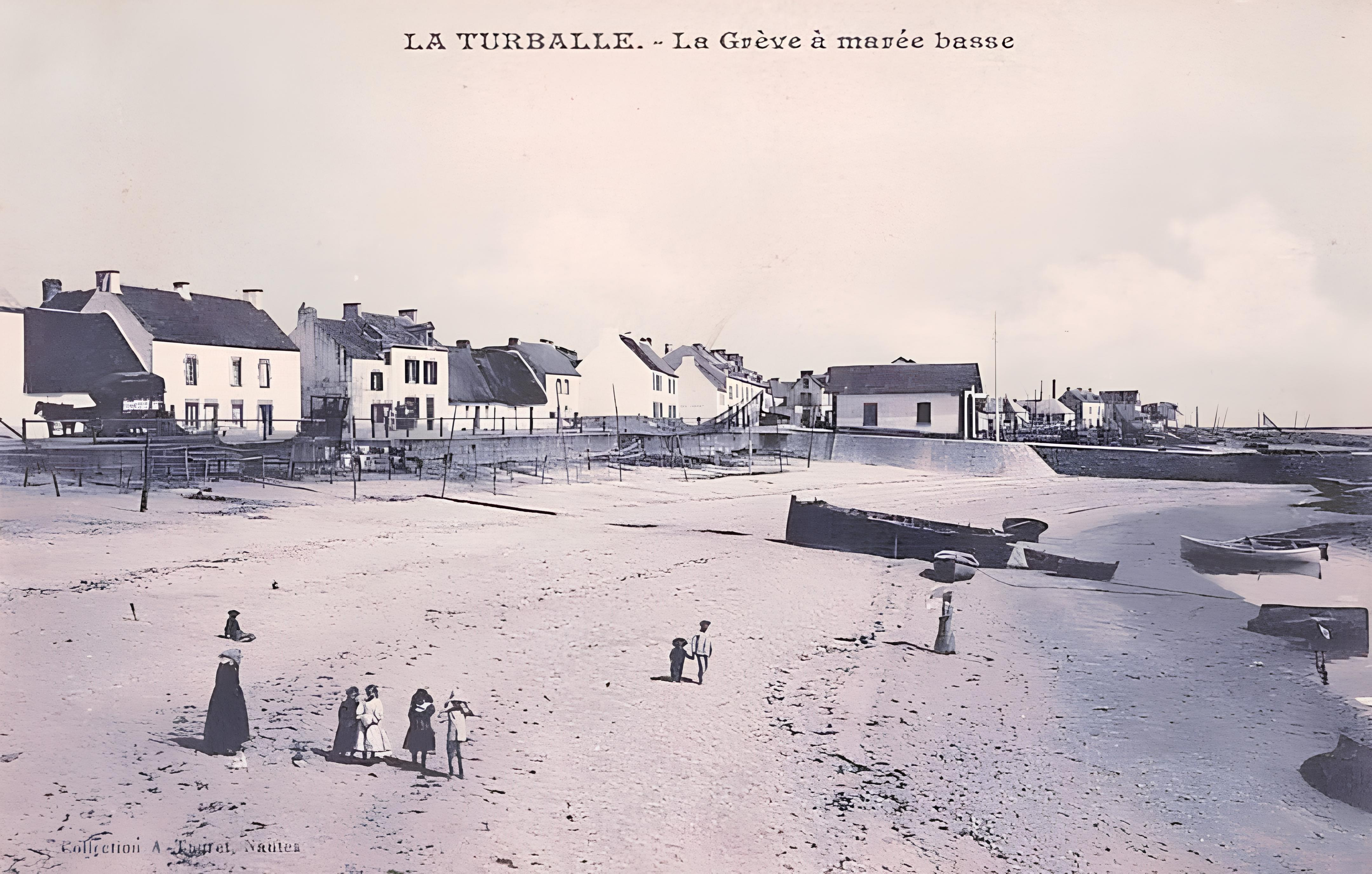
Former strike in front of the Saint-Paul quay, before the port was developed

Le Croisic was the first seaside resort on the Guérande Peninsula. In 1819, it began receiving visitors drawn by the potential benefits of seawater therapy, which was popular at a time when tuberculosis had no medical treatment. Over time, Port Lin beach became the preferred location, and in 1845, Batz-sur-Mer’s Valentin beach opened a facility for hydrotherapy.

La Turballe welcomed its first bathers in the mid-19th century. At that time, it was still a district of Guérande, and a municipal decree regulating sea bathing was signed on July 1, 1858, by the mayor of Guérande. The decree established rules in accordance with the moral standards of the period: it required bathers to wear a complete bathing costume when entering the water in front of houses, prohibited persons of different sexes from bathing together unless fully clothed in proper attire, and forbade the use of obscene language or gestures that could offend public morality.

Tourism in La Turballe remained limited during this period due to inadequate transportation, as the railway reached the town only in 1906 via a secondary line. Tourism was also constrained by the presence of canning factories, which produced odors that affected visitors. Early tourist maps of the region did not indicate La Turballe. The prevalence of tuberculosis, which had contributed to the popularity of sea bathing, led to the establishment of the Pen-Bron Marine Center in 1887.

Tourism in La Turballe developed gradually with the advent of the automobile. The first seaside villas were constructed around 1900, and the municipality promoted seasonal tourism after the First World War as an alternative to the declining canning industry. The commune had two hotels, the Hôtel de la Plage and the Hôtel des Voyageurs, located near the train station. Early visitors primarily sought swimming on the village’s sandy beach, which also functioned as a grounding port, occasionally affecting interactions with fishermen. Following the closure of the last canneries, former factory sites were redeveloped for housing, reflecting the post-Second World War growth of tourism.

The deep-water marina of La Turballe is municipally owned and managed. Developed in the 1970s, it occupies 18,300 m² and features 500 meters of pontoons. The marina provides 364 berths, including 329 for year-round mooring and 35 for visiting vessels. A reception dock accommodates approximately 40 boats, and a launching ramp is available to boaters from April to October with free access.

=== Heritage boats ===
The heritage boats moored at the port of La Turballe include:

- Au Gré des Vents, a former fishing boat of the sardine type;
- Steredenn Vor (“starfish” in Breton) is a gaff-rigged cutter built in 1946 in Étel, measuring 6.59 meters in length, 2.25 meters in width, with a draft of 0.90 meters and powered by an 18-horsepower Yanmar engine. Initially used as a lobster boat in Hœdic, it later operated in La Turballe for mackerel fishing under skipper Jean Le Bayon. In 2014, the Steredenn Vor Association was established to restore the vessel. After several months of work and six years of sailing, the hull was found to be too deteriorated for safe navigation. It was subsequently rebuilt identically by the Skol Ar Mor training shipyard in Mesquer. In July 2023, the Steredenn Vor was relaunched as a certified Boat of Heritage Interest (BIP) and resumed sailing from the port of La Turballe.
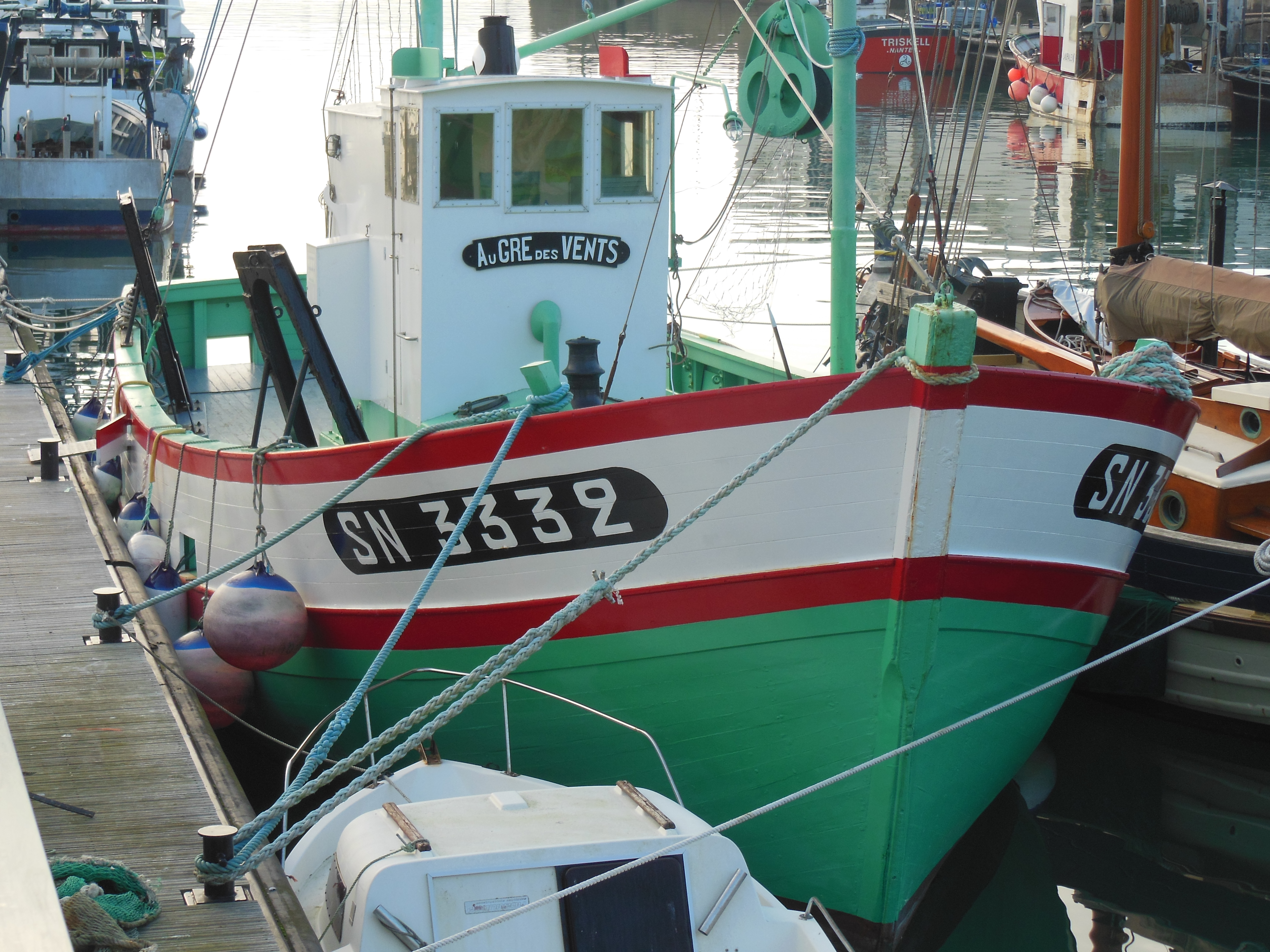
Au Gré des Vents

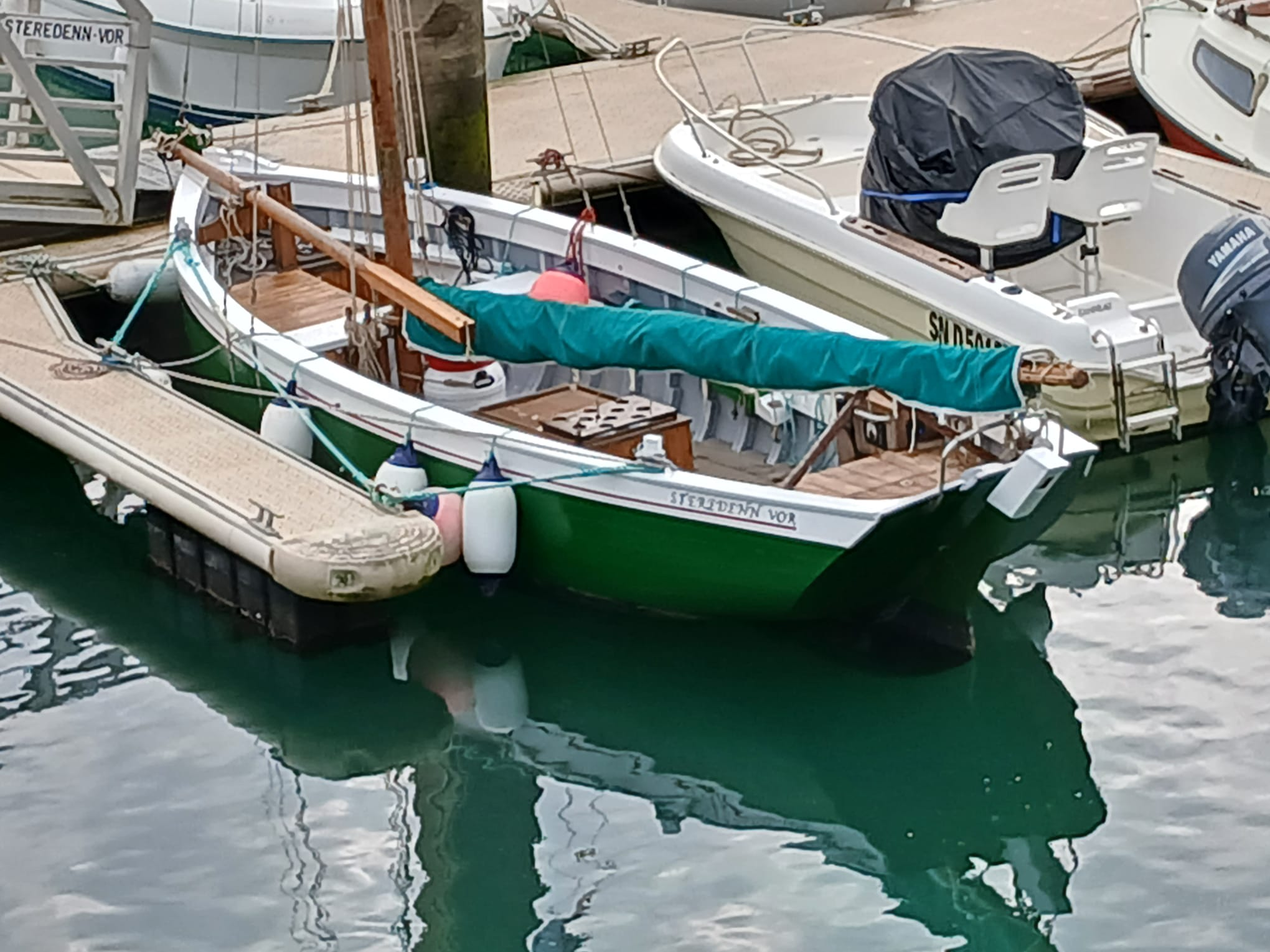
Steredenn Vor

=== Offshore wind turbine maintenance ===
The maintenance base for the Saint-Nazaire Offshore Wind Farm, located in the port of La Turballe, functions as a supervision and control center for the wind turbines and coordinates maintenance operations. These operations are limited to light preventive and corrective tasks, while the replacement of large components, such as turbine blades, is conducted from the port of Saint-Nazaire.

The base includes a control room, offices, locker rooms, and a warehouse. Three vessels transport maintenance technicians to and from the wind farm for daily operations.

Personnel at the base include maintenance technicians, technical coordinators, logisticians, and planners responsible for managing and coordinating on-site activities. The facility provides approximately one hundred jobs over the 25-year operational lifespan of the wind farm.

From January 2021 to June 2022, the port underwent expansion to create a new quay and a one-hectare platform to support offshore wind turbine maintenance. The project included extending the existing breakwater by 400 meters, constructing a new breakwater with an adjoining slipway, developing a basin, and building a platform to reinforce naval and fishing activities.

The first offshore supply vessel, Inno'Vent, a 24-meter catamaran, was delivered on August 9, 2022. Commissioned by General Electric from Louis Dreyfus Armateurs and Tidal Transit Limited, the vessel transfers technicians and equipment between the maintenance base and the offshore wind farm.

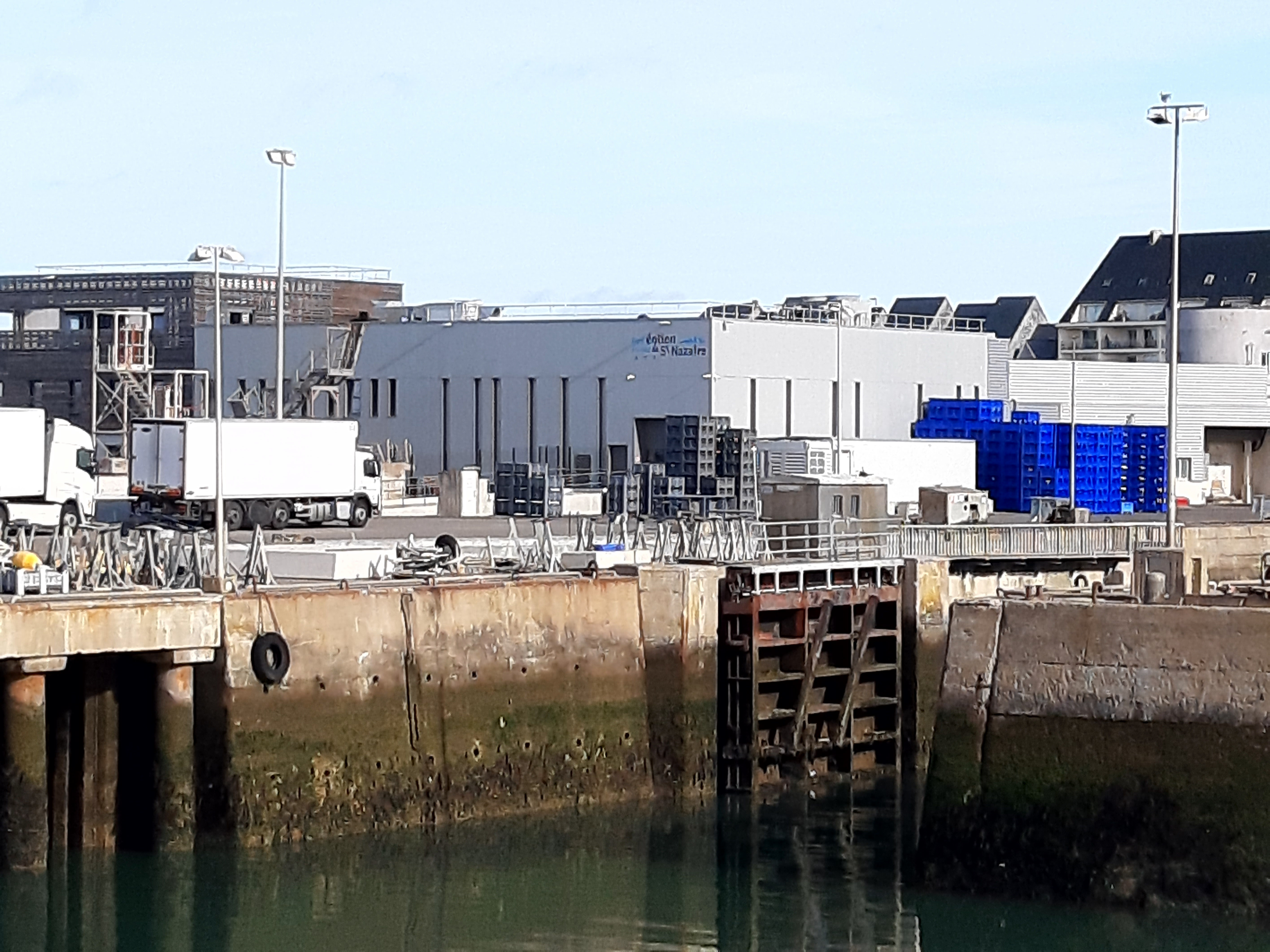
Maintenance base for the Saint-Nazaire offshore wind farm.

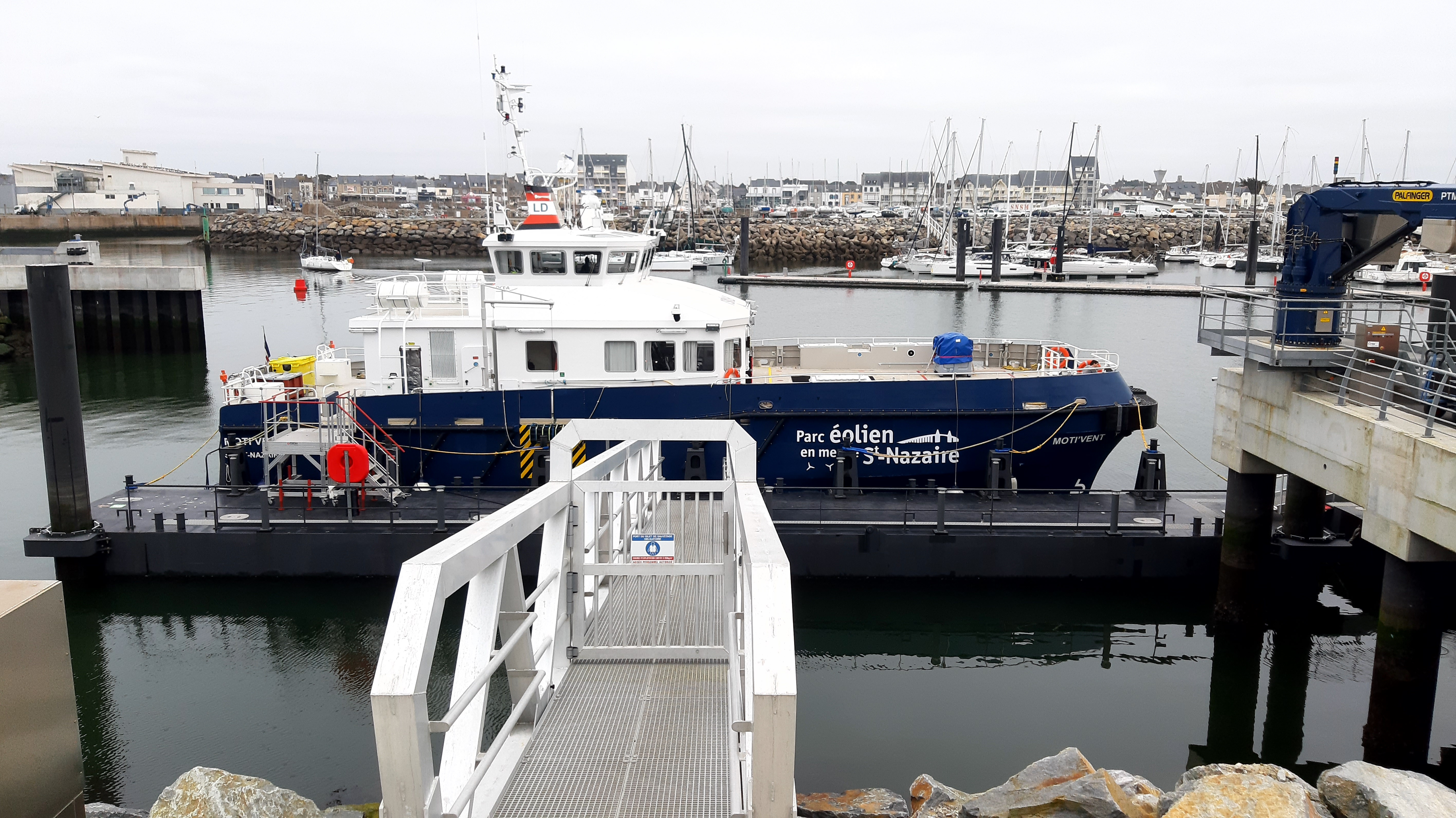
Moti' Vent offshore supply vessel for the Saint-Nazaire offshore wind farm moored at the EMR quay in the port of La Turballe.

== See also ==
- Marina
- Careening
