= Batz-sur-Mer Breton =

Extinct dialect of Breton related to Vannetais

Batz-sur-Mer
- Guérandais
- Brezhoneg Gwenrann
- Native to: France
- Region: Batz-sur-Mer
- Ethnicity: Bretons
- Extinct: 1960s
- Language family: Indo-European: Celtic; Insular Celtic; Brittonic; Southwestern Brittonic; Breton; Batz-sur-Mer
- Writing system: Latin script (Breton alphabet)

Language codes
- ISO 639-3: –
- Glottolog: None

Batz-sur-Mer Breton is the variant of Breton spoken in Batz-sur-Mer (Loire-Atlantique), the last vestige of Breton dialects in the Guérande region and the Nantais region. The last speakers died in the 1960s.

== The Breton language in Loire-Atlantique ==
Breton was spoken in the Middle Ages in a large area of the current department of Loire-Atlantique, in the Guérande region, quite deep into the Nantais region, as far as Lusanger, Nort-sur-Erdre, Vigneux-de-Bretagne, Bouée and the coastal fringe of the Pays de Retz. This maximum extension, determined by toponymy, dates back to the 9th century. Breton-Romance bilingualism was probably prevalent in many parts of this area.

Subsequently, Breton gradually moved westward in favor of Gallo, the Oïl dialect spoken in Upper Brittany. It is estimated that the linguistic boundary stabilized during the 12th century to the west of the Brière marshes. Toponymy indicates the area where this boundary finally stabilized (place names in ker-). It is this territory that forms the traditional Guérande region, which, because of the language, belongs to Celtic Lower Brittany and not to Romance Upper Brittany.

Testimonies and documents allow us to know more precisely the area where Breton is spoken in Loire-Atlantique:

- 1695: The map by Jean-Baptiste Nolin indicates that Breton is still spoken to the west of a line including Férel, Herbignac, Saint-Lyphard, Guérande and Le Pouliguen; Saint-André-des-Eaux, Loire-Atlantique and La Baule-Escoublac are in the Romance zone, but close to the Breton-Gallo border;
- 1794: The French government decides by a decree of the national convention of the 8th day of Pluviôse of the year II that: "A French-speaking teacher will be established within ten days, starting from the date of publication of this decree, in each rural commune of the departments of Morbihan, Finistère, Côtes-du-Nord and in the part of Loire-Inférieure whose inhabitants speak the language called Bas-Breton;"
- 1806: Coquebert de Montbret 's survey indicates that Breton is spoken south of the Vilaine in Férel, Camoël, Pénestin. We also learn that Breton is still known in Bourg-de-Batz (Batz-sur-Mer), and that "the dividing line of the two languages begins at the salt marshes of Herbignac in the territory of the Loire-Inférieure department [...]", that is, in the western part of the commune of Assérac, as well as in part of Saint-Molf, but probably also towards Mesquer and Piriac-sur-Mer. This survey did not concern the Loire-Inférieure department for administrative reasons. It is therefore very imprecise for the region that interests us;
- mid- 19th century: According to a testimony collected by Paulin Benoist, some elders still spoke Breton in Piriac-sur-Mer after 1830 and in Mesquer even later. In 1889, Canon Le Méné mentioned the disappearance of Breton in Pénestin "at a time quite close to ours";
- 1878: According to Paul Sébillot, seven communes readily speak Breton and understand French. There are approximately 1,200 people who know it;
- 1886: Sébillot's survey indicates that Breton, although extinct in all the other communes located south of the Vilaine, is still spoken in Bourg-de-Batz. This information is confirmed in 1887 by Alcide Leroux, who says that "in four villages of […] Bourg-de-Batz [… Kermoisan, Kervalet, Trégaté and Roffiat …], people aged 40 all know Breton"; he hears children playing in Breton in the streets of the village of Roffiat, proof of the vitality of the language;
- 1911: in the Linguistic Atlas of Lower Brittany , it is indicated: “Bourg-de-Batz, Le Croisic, Loire-Inférieure, day laborer, 72 years old; only people of her age speak Breton well”.

Batz-sur-Mer is therefore the last commune in the Pays Nantais to have spoken Breton.

== Disappearance ==
Breton remained in the town until the beginning of the 19th century, in the rue du Four and in the Kerbouchard district.

The villages concerned by the late practice of Breton are, according to Léon Bureau in 1875: Kervalet, Kermoisan, Kerdréan, Beauregard, Kerbéan, Le Guho, Trégaté and Roffiat, salt marsh villages with a total of 1,320 inhabitants. Keralan a seaside village, was where a young girl, from whom Pitre de Lisle du Dréneuc collected a song in Breton in 1872, lived. Penchâteau, in the commune of Le Pouliguen, retained late speakers. In 1875, Léon Bureau estimated that Breton was the usual language of around 400 people, but did not cite the number of those who knew how to speak it. He also said that the habit of speaking French to children was very recent (for 4 to 5 years).

Breton served as a language of communication until the 1910s and 1920s, mainly in the village of Roffiat. Born in that village, speakers died between 1960 and 1970. Jean-Marie Cavalin, known as "Yannik", was recorded in 1959, and Suzanne Moreau and Florestine Cavalin were interviewed by Léon Fleuriot in 1960 and 1961. A lady who died in 1988 at the age of 99 had spoken Breton in her childhood in the village of Kervalet.

Some late informants like Marie-Françoise Le Berre, interviewed shortly before her death in 1983, can be considered passive speakers of this dialect (total understanding but inability to speak it).

Attempts at transmission continued until the 1940s: Pierre Le Gal noted down a few words and phrases at that time through contact with his Breton-speaking grandfather Guillaume Pain. This lexicon is presented in Gildas Buron's exhibition.

Abbot Cadic claims to have met the last speaker of local Breton in 1925, Clémence Le Berre, then aged seventy-two, in the village of Kermoisan. This hypothesis must be rejected in light of the fact that the very existence of Clémence Le Berre is doubtful: neither the civil status registers nor local memory have any record of her according to Gildas Buron.

== Collection ==
Léon Bureau, a Nantes industrialist and language enthusiast, was the main collector of Batz Breton. He learned it around 1875 from various informants, including Marie-Françoise Mouilleron, who worked as a salt carrier. His interest in Batz Breton can be explained by the fact that his family owned a residence in Penchâteau in Pouliguen.

Émile Ernault, who compiled Bureau's notes, then Pierre Le Roux in 1910 (Linguistic Atlas of Lower Brittany, Batz is survey point 90), Dom Gaston Godu in 1942, Per Manac'h in 1959, Léon Fleuriot in 1960-61 and Donatien Laurent in 1962, all interviewed speakers.

More recently, Gildas Buron, curator of the Batz Salt Marshes Museum, gathered a significant amount of information on local Breton over 25 years of documentary research and surveys of children and grandchildren of Breton speakers, and has brought together the majority of known sources.

Today, over 2,000 words and verbal forms of Batz Breton are known from texts and numerous notes, one complete song and two fragments of songs, and a short recording of a speaker, Jean-Marie Cavalin, made in 1959 by Per Manac'h.

== Phrases ==
The following examples, taken from the work of Léon Bureau and Émile Ernault, provide a precise idea of the particularities of this dialect.

- Pihaneñ a noñ chtri zo er vrasoc'h? "Which of us three is the greatest?"
- Hia ez chèit sé erbèit d'heñ lakel "She has no dress to wear"
- Hañ bwéi venéi laret ke tchèit ter hi fot éhéoñ e wé "He would have wanted to say that it wasn't his fault"
- En dèn a bif hou gourn kevèl "The man you are asking about"
- Un amezèir benak goudé, er yaweñkeñ a bwé vol dachtumèit hag a wé èt abar ur bro pèl-mat, hag anhéoñ hañ bwé débrèit vol pèh-ma en devwé "Some time later, the youngest had gathered everything and gone to a faraway country, and there he had eaten everything he had"
- Ur vèij anhéoñ, hañ fehé béi koñteñ-mat débreñ hi guarc'h aven er boèit ma er morc'h a zebreñ, mè nikoeñ ne ré nétre de-héoñ "Once there, he would have been happy to earn his living from the food that the pigs ate, but no one gave him anything."
- N'é ke puto det d'er gèr "Didn't he come home sooner?"
- Ma me beét tchèit sérèit me lagadéo, hi beét ma dalèit "If I hadn't closed my eyes, you would have blinded me"
- Er vatèic'h a me sat "My father’s servant"
- De de yahat "To your health"
- Me dochté ar gèr pi er glow déez me gamerèit "I was approaching the house when the rain surprised me"
- A-blèic'h i zéo ? "Where are you from?"
- Ma foda lèc'h éma legn a rac'h ter boeik "My milk jug is full to the brim"
- Me de chelevou tchèit "I won't listen to you"
- Hañ ga de reñ glow ember "It's going to rain later"
- Azurh miteñ dezurh en nos "From morning until evening"
- Pikèit ter ur geliéoñ "Bite by a fly"
- Me forh tchèi bitèrh lakel mouid abars "I can't put much in it at all"

== Von Harff's Glossary ==
The Breton glossary noted in Nantes in 1499 by the German knight Arnold von Harff presents clearly South Armorican features, perhaps comparable to the Breton of Batz after deciphering the sounds rendered by the Middle German scripts of von Harff. Examples:

- "salt": haelen (pour /ha:len/), Batz héleñ, mais vannetais halen.
- "water": doir (pour /dur/), Batz dour, vannetais deur.
- "to drink": hisit (rétabli en probable /ivit/), Batz eveit ou evet, vannetais ivein (mais Damgan ivat > infinitif en t aussi).
- "God": doie (pour /du:e/), Batz douhé
- "two": duwe (pour /dow/), Batz do ou déo

This glossary has several limitations: the place of origin of the informant is not specified, which leaves some uncertainty; C.-J. Guyonvarc'h leans towards the La Baule – Presqu'île de Guérande. Furthermore, von Harff was only a simple curious person and made an approximate note of what he heard. What will be remembered above all from this unique document, the first effective testimony on spoken Breton, is that the dialectalization of Breton was accomplished at the end of the 15th century.
