= Works by Jean Fréour =

This is a listing of some of the works of Jean Fréour.

== The Oratory (worship) Notre-Dame de la Sainte Espérance at Louisfert ==
This statue by Fréour by the Église Saint-Pierre-es-liens celebrated a pilgrimage to the location in 1947. It depicts the "Vierge à l'Enfant".

== Les Laveuses d'huîtres ==
Fréours bronze sculpture depicting two Breton women washing oysters stands in Cancale's place de l'église.

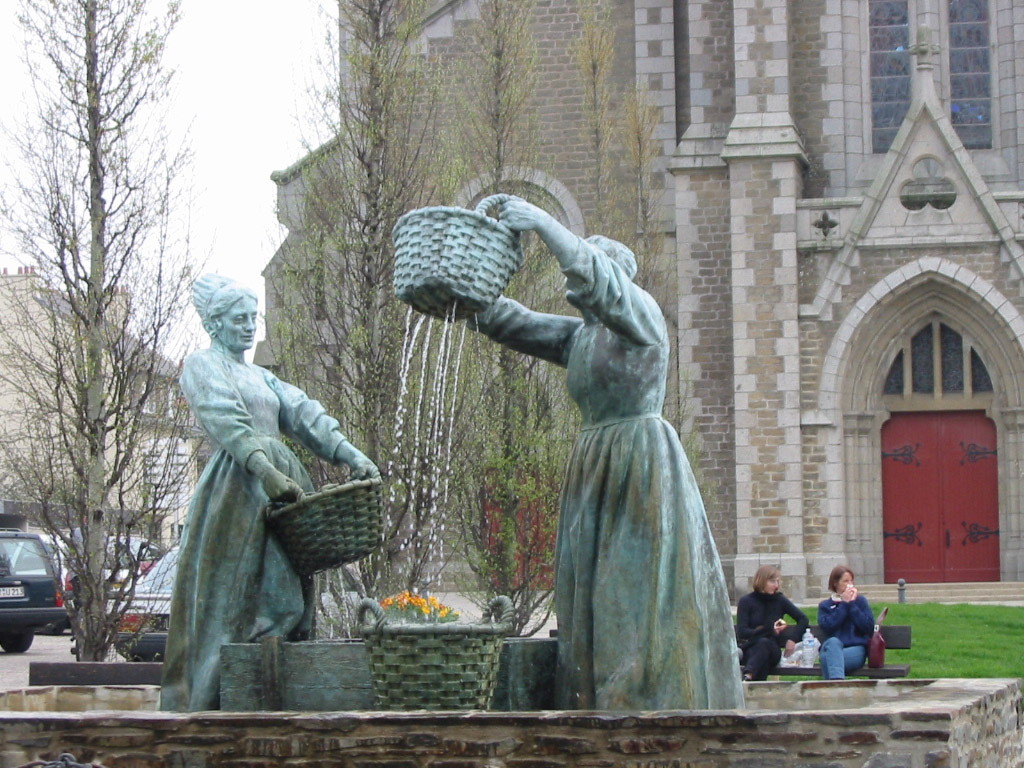
Les Laveuses d'huîtres

== René Guy Cadou ==
Fréour was the sculptor of a bust of this poet which is located in Bourgneuf-en-Retz

== Monument to Pierre Bouguer ==
This monument stands in Le Croisic, Bouguer's birthplace in 1698. Bouguer was a French mathematician. Fréour executed the sculpture of Bouguer for the monument.

== Chapelle Saint-Louis ==
Fréour sculpted a statue of St Louis for the façade of this Mesquer-Quimiac chapel and inside the church is his sculpture "Vierge à l'Enfant".

== The "Église Sainte-Thérèse" ==
Jean was commissioned to execute work for this church in Nantes.

== Église Ste Thérèse in Muzillac ==
After a fire in 1929 the church was rebuilt by 1934. There are two works by Fréour in this church dating to 1955. One is carved from exotic wood and depicts the Virgin Mary and the other of St Joseph is carved from oak. It has been recorded that Fréour based his depiction of St Joseph on himself.

== Église de Notre Dame de Grâce ==
For this church in Guenrouët, Fréour was commissioned to execute the statues for the lateral altars; Mary presenting Jesus, this carved from Limewood, St Anne carved from oak and St Joseph as carpenter.

== Le Loroux-Bottereau ==
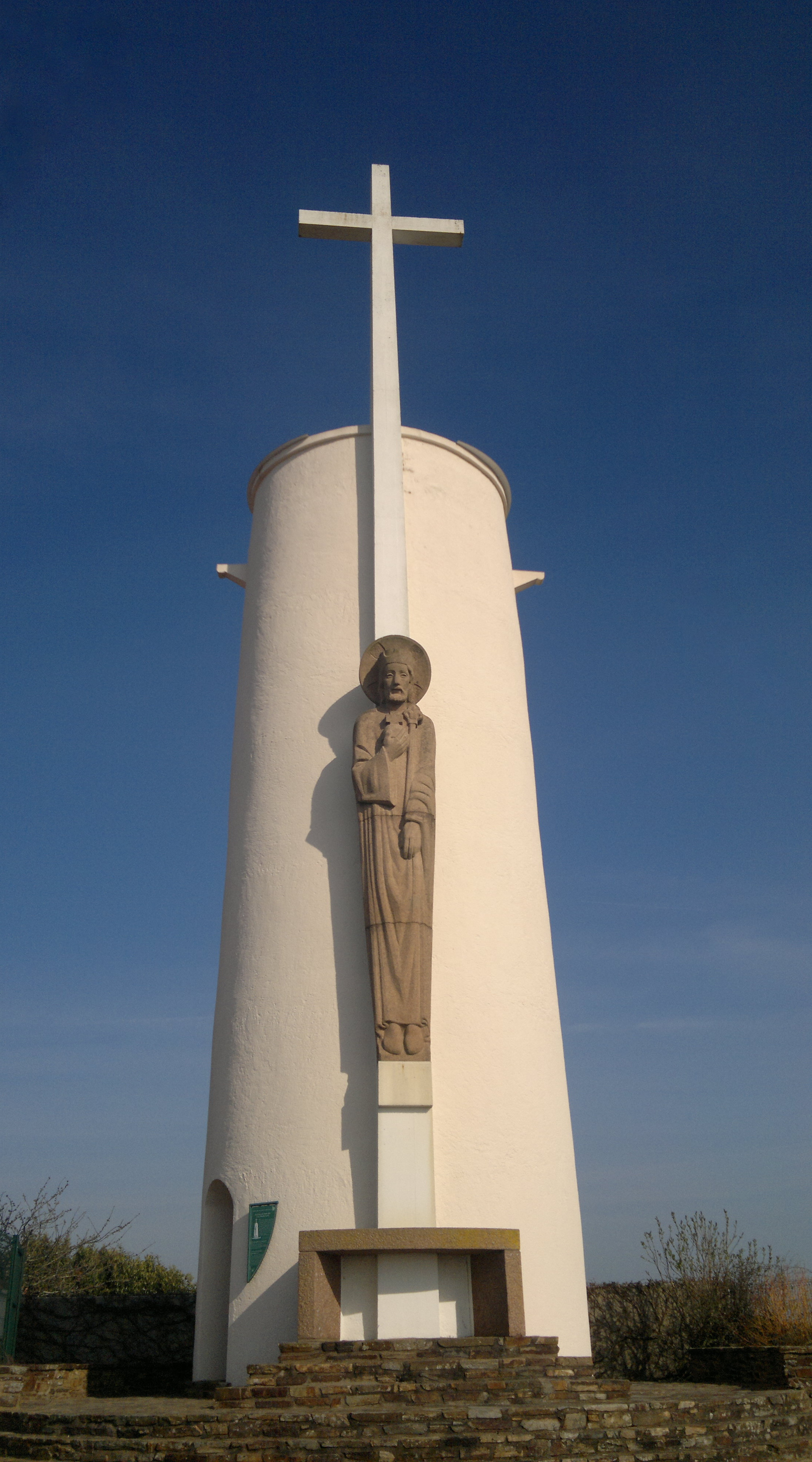
Fréour sculpture on old windmill

In 1957 Fréour sculpted the figure of Christ in rose-coloured granite, and this has been attached to an old 18th-century windmill, the "moulin du Pé", which is effectively a calvary. The figure is 5.6 metres high.

== Le Pouliguen ==
For the church of Saint Nicolas, Fréour executed two sculptures in 1958. In the choir area of the church is a "Christ en Gloire" and also in the church interior there is a sculpture by Fréour showing Joseph and the young Jesus as an apprentice carpenter.

== Bust of Charles Cornic ==
This Fréour bust of the French sailor, admiral and privateer during the Revolution (corsair) was erected on 22 April 1947. It stands by the entry to Morlaix' port. A bronze bust had been erected in 1897, but melted down in 1942. In 1947 the replacement was sculpted by Fréour but in stone. He used the original mould which had been preserved.

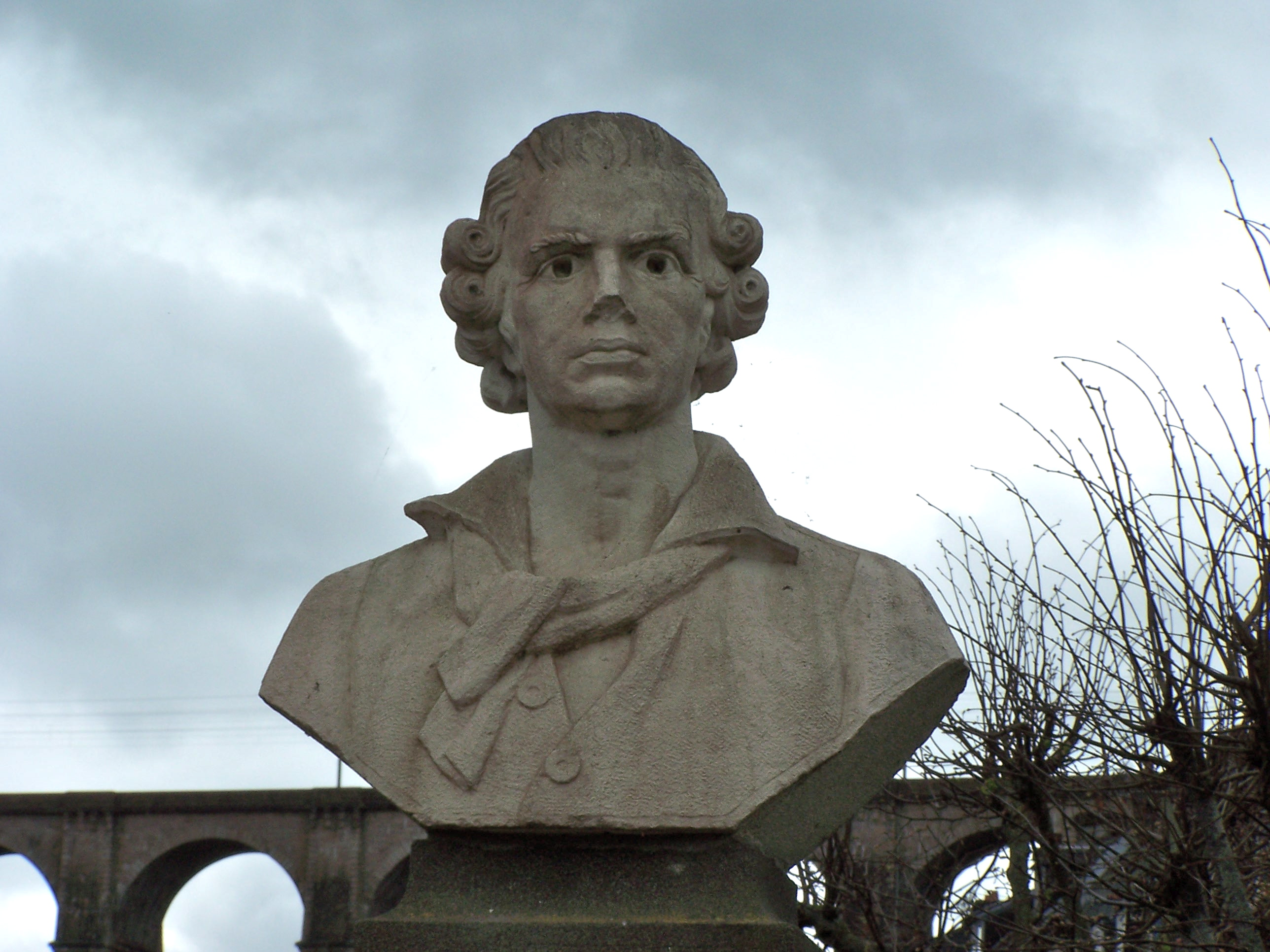
Bust of Charles Cornic by Fréour

== Mouais ==
The Notre-Dame de la Trinité church has a "poutre de gloire" (Rood screen) over the entry to the choir with a 15th-century carving of Jesus in the centre, surrounded by Fréours sculptures depicting Mary and John the Evangelist.

== La Porteresse ==
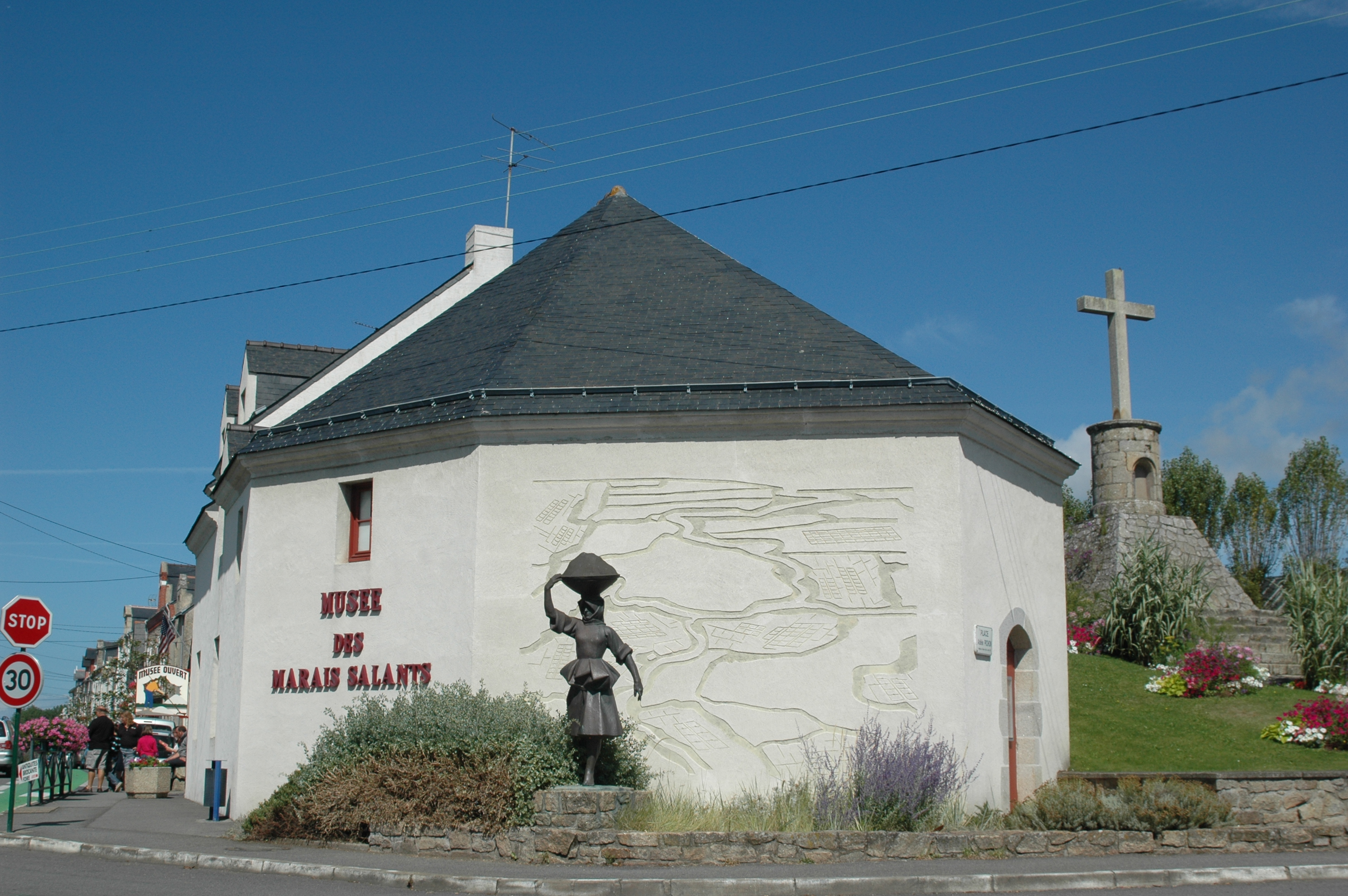
Fréour's statue stands in front of the Musée des marais salants.

This 1983 bronze sculpture by Fréour stands outside Batz-sur-Mer's museum devoted to the history of the local salt marshes. It depicts a woman carrying salt contained in a wooden receptacle called a "gède". She carried the "gède" balanced on her head. In the days before mechanization this was how the salt was taken from the salt marsh, the porters being more often than not women. The museum was founded back in 1887 to record and display information on this age-old Breton industry. The 1650 hectares of the Guérande salt marshes around the Traict du Croisic extend to the towns of Batz-sur-Mer, Guérande and La Turballe. The second large salt marsh in the area, the Mès marsh, extends to the towns of Mesquer, St Molf and Assérac. The people who harvested the salt were known as "paludiers" (female "paludières"). In 1955 Fréour had decided to live and work in Batz-sur-Mer after living near Châteaubriant. In fact he served as the mayor of Batz-sur-Mer for a period of one year.

== Eglise Saint-Guénolé ==
This church in Batz-sur-Mer contains three sculptures by Fréour. One is a depiction of Christ and is located near the St John the Baptist altar, the second is a statue entitled "Notre-Dame du Précieux Sang" and the third a composition entitled "la Sainte Famille".

== The Calvary near Nozay, Loire-Atlantique ==
In 1947 Fréour worked on the calvary at Créviac. His composition depicted Christ on the Cross with the Virgin Mary and John the Evangelist at the base. He added some relief carvings depicting scenes from Jesus' life and a sculpture showing Christ being brought down from the Cross.

== The parish church of Mesquer ==
For this church, Fréour executed a sculpture for the crèche and a sculpture for one of the church's altars

== Châteaubriant ==
Fréours 1950 statue depicting Saint Rita can be seen in the Église de Béré.

== Villepot ==
In Villepot's Notre Dame de l’Assomption church there are two works by Fréour. Both carved from wood, one depicting Jesus and the other the Virgin Mary.

== Église Sainte-Anne Lamotte-Beuvron ==
Fréour executed statues of St Vincent de Paul and Jeanne d'Arc for this church

== "Le Bon Pasteur" ==
The Saint-Sauveur church in Bouvron, Loire-Atlantique suffered much war damage in the 1939-1945 war and in 1955 Fréour created a high relief sculpture entitled "Le Bon Pasteur" for the church façade.

== The Breton calvary ==
He has a sculpture in the Saint-Charles de Potyze French military cemetery in Ypres. It is a war memorial and in Belgium but uses the Breton calvary.

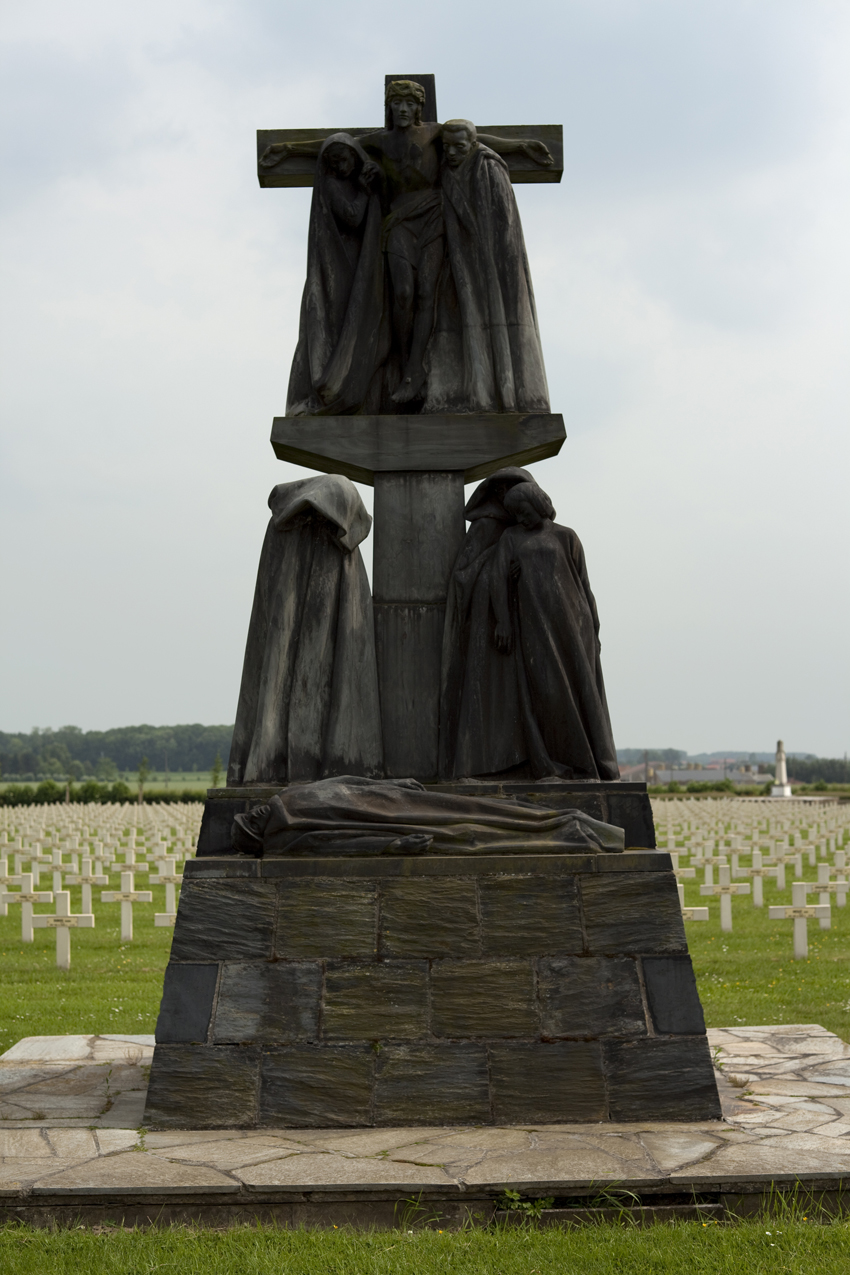
Fréour's sculpture in the Saint-Charles de Potyze French military cemetery.

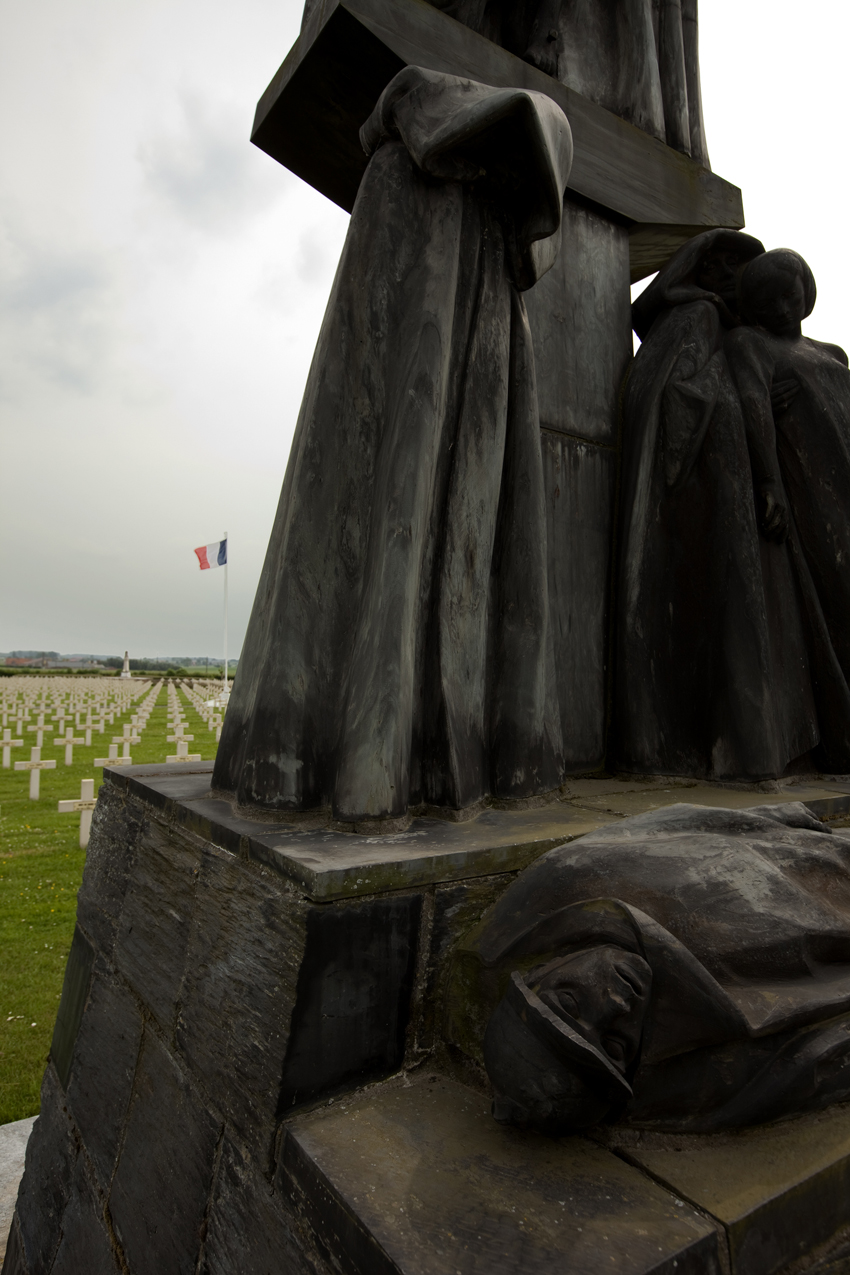
Fréour's sculpture in the Saint-Charles de Potyze French military cemetery.

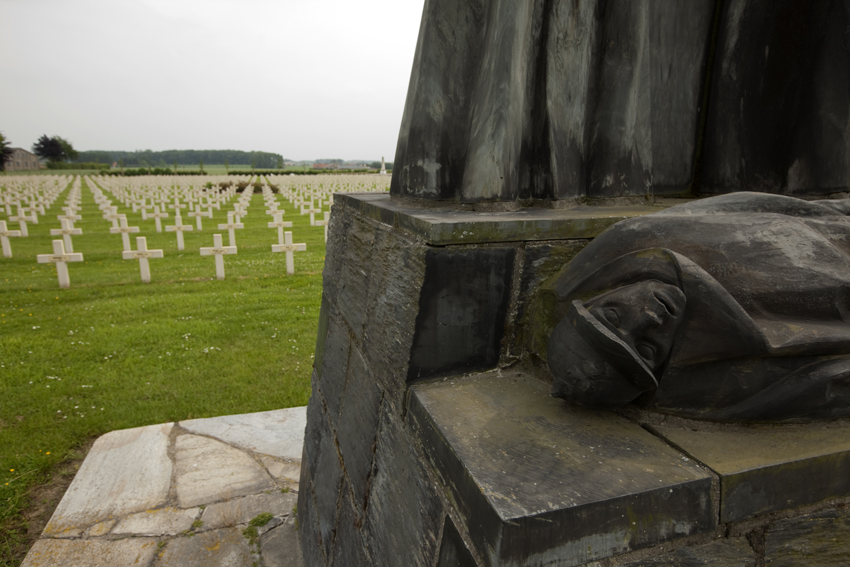
Fréour's sculpture in the Saint-Charles de Potyze French military cemetery.

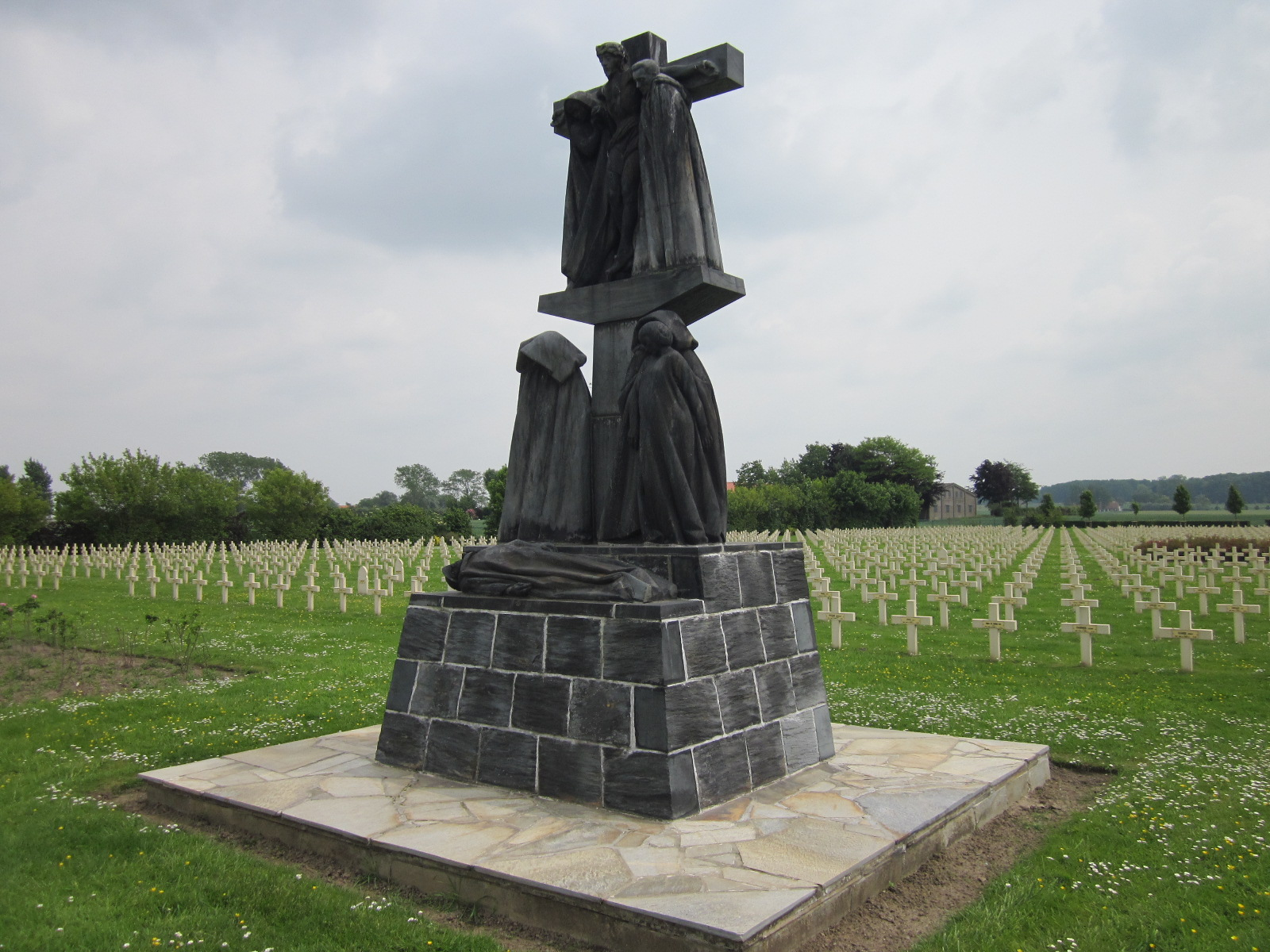
Fréour's sculpture in the Saint-Charles de Potyze French military cemetery.

== Anne de Bretagne ==
This famous Jean Fréour bronze is located in the Château des ducs de Bretagne.

== Notre-Dame-des-Langueurs ==
For this church in Joué-sur-Erdre, Fréour executed a sculpture which depicted Jesus with St Joseph, St Anthony, St Mainboeuf and the Virgin Mary and Mary Magdelane. He also executed a calvary in 1954.

== Sainte Thérèse de Lisieux ==
In the parish church of Bruz there is a statue of Sainte Thérèse de Lisieux by Fréour.

== Statue of St Conwoïon ==
This Fréour sculpture can be seen in Redon. It was blessed in 1958 and is 2.3 metres high.

== Armand Tuffin de La Rouërie ==
This bronze 1993 monument stands in Fougères's Place Aristide Briand (Square des Fusillés). Tuffin de La Rouërie was a Breton cavalry officer who served under the American flag during the American War of Independence. The bronze was cast by the Châtillon foundry Fonderie Valsuani. The inscription reads

"Armand Tuffin marquis de La Rouërie Heros de la Guerre d'Indépendance des Etats-Unis d'Amérique Defenseur de l'Identité bretonne Fondateur de l'Association Bretonne 1751-1793/ Armand Tuffin marquis de La Rouërie Hero of the American Revolution Defender of the Breton Identity Founder of the Breton Association 1751 - 1793. Signed: J. Freour"

The original statue was melted down in 1942 so that the metal could be used again. Freour based his sculpture on a mould left by the Derbré foundry.

== Chapelle Notre-Dame-de-Merquel ==
This small chapel at the pointe de Merquel, Mesquer was destroyed by the Germans in 1944 and rebuilt in 1949. It contains a statue of St Médard by Fréour. He carried out this work in polychromed wood in 1950.

== Émile Le Scanff ==
This Breton singer was known as "Glenmor" and Fréour worked on his memorial in Rennes's parc du Thabor. The memorial was erected in 1998.

== Saint-Étienne-de-Mer-Morte ==
Fréour was responsible for the decoration of the church altar in 1946.

== Statue of General Marie-Pierre Kœnig ==
Fréour was the sculptor of the statue of Kœnig inaugurated in 1991. Kœnig had fought as a sergeant in the 36th Infantry in the 1914-1918 war and in the following years he received regular promotions. He fought with the Free French forces ("Forces Françaises Libres") at Bir-Hakeim against Rommel, became the first military governor of Paris after it was liberated, became a French Minister of War and at the end of what was a glittering career was made a "Maréchal de France" in 1984. The statue stands at the Écoles de St Cyr-Coëtquidan.

== Notre-Dame-de-Boulogne ==
There is a granite sculpture by the Nort-sur-Erdre harbour of the Virgin Mary and the infant Jesus. It was erected in December 1949 and dedicated to Notre- Dame-de Boulogne or as she is sometimes called "Notre Dame du Bon Retour". It was a place of pilgrimage for those praying for the safety of those who were held as prisoners in Germany . In Freour's sculpture Notre- Dame-de Boulogne is aboard a small boat.

== Le Musee du pays de Guérande ==
This museum holds an early work by Freour. It is a sculpture in wood depicting a "Bigouden at prayer". It dates to 1942.
