= Arrondissement of Saint-Nazaire =

Coordinates: 47.28°N 2.20°W

Saint-Nazaire
- Arrondissement
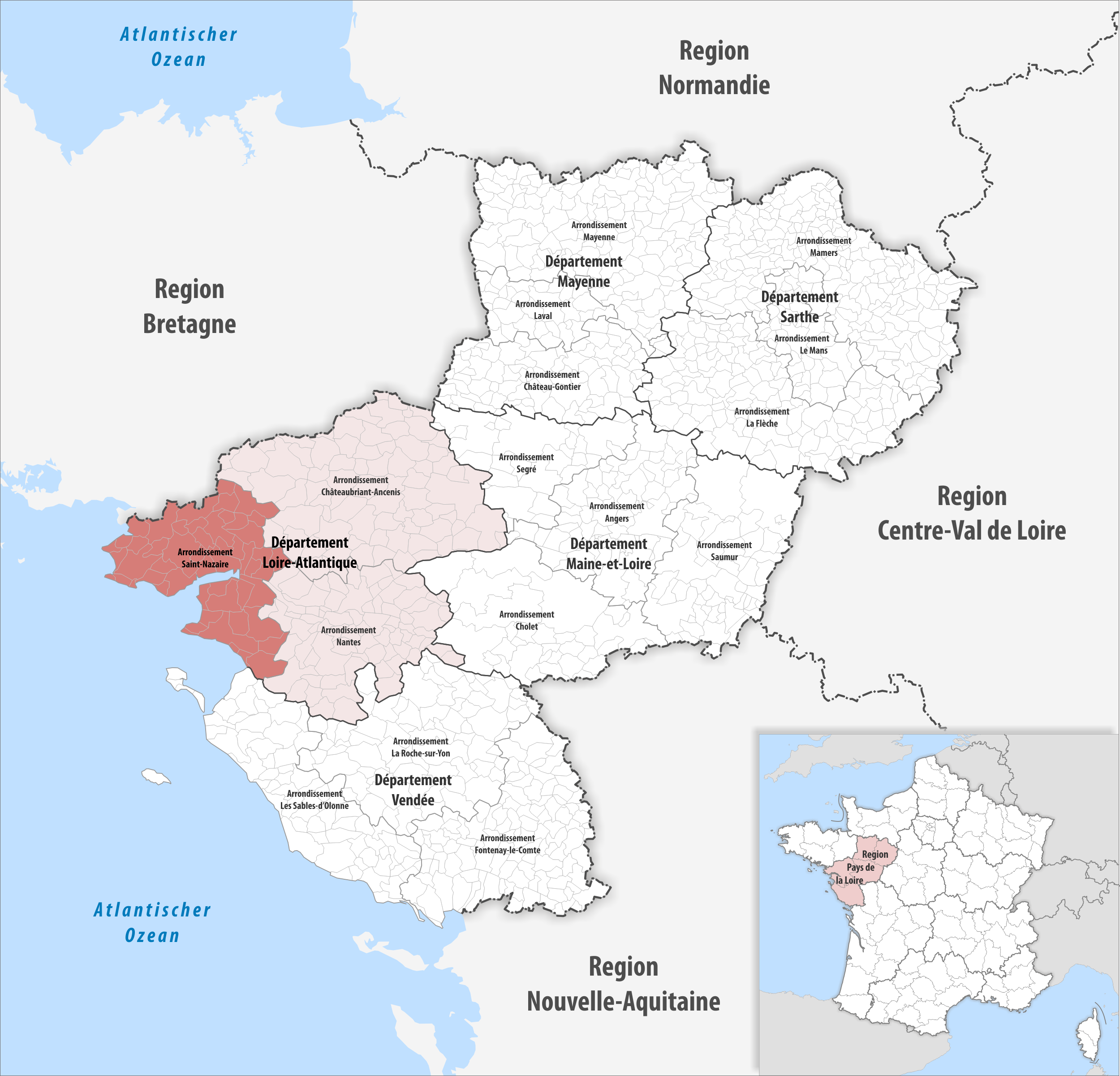
- Location within the region Pays de la Loire
- Country: France
- Region: Pays de la Loire
- Department: Loire-Atlantique
- No. of communes: {{{nbcomm}}}
- Area: 1,758.1 km^{2} (678.8 sq mi)
- Population (2023): 355,480
  - Density: 202.20/km^{2} (523.68/sq mi)
- INSEE code: 443

The arrondissement of Saint-Nazaire is an arrondissement of France in the Loire-Atlantique department in the Pays de la Loire region. It has 55 communes. Its population is 345,185 (2021), and its area is 1,758.1 km^{2} (678.8 sq mi).

== Composition ==
The communes of the arrondissement of Saint-Nazaire, and their INSEE codes, are:

1. Assérac (44006)
2. Batz-sur-Mer (44010)
3. La Baule-Escoublac (44055)
4. La Bernerie-en-Retz (44012)
5. Besné (44013)
6. Bouée (44019)
7. Campbon (44025)
8. La Chapelle-Launay (44033)
9. La Chapelle-des-Marais (44030)
10. Chaumes-en-Retz (44005)
11. Chauvé (44038)
12. Corsept (44046)
13. Le Croisic (44049)
14. Crossac (44050)
15. Donges (44052)
16. Drefféac (44053)
17. Frossay (44061)
18. Guenrouet (44068)
19. Guérande (44069)
20. Herbignac (44072)
21. Lavau-sur-Loire (44080)
22. Malville (44089)
23. Mesquer (44097)
24. Missillac (44098)
25. Montoir-de-Bretagne (44103)
26. Les Moutiers-en-Retz (44106)
27. Paimbœuf (44116)
28. Piriac-sur-Mer (44125)
29. La Plaine-sur-Mer (44126)
30. Pontchâteau (44129)
31. Pornic (44131)
32. Pornichet (44132)
33. Le Pouliguen (44135)
34. Préfailles (44136)
35. Prinquiau (44137)
36. Quilly (44139)
37. Saint-André-des-Eaux (44151)
38. Saint-Brevin-les-Pins (44154)
39. Sainte-Anne-sur-Brivet (44152)
40. Sainte-Reine-de-Bretagne (44189)
41. Saint-Gildas-des-Bois (44161)
42. Saint-Hilaire-de-Chaléons (44164)
43. Saint-Joachim (44168)
44. Saint-Lyphard (44175)
45. Saint-Malo-de-Guersac (44176)
46. Saint-Michel-Chef-Chef (44182)
47. Saint-Molf (44183)
48. Saint-Nazaire (44184)
49. Saint-Père-en-Retz (44187)
50. Saint-Viaud (44192)
51. Savenay (44195)
52. Sévérac (44196)
53. Trignac (44210)
54. La Turballe (44211)
55. Villeneuve-en-Retz (44021)

== History ==
The arrondissement of Savenay was created in 1800. The subprefecture was moved to Saint-Nazaire in 1868.

As a result of the reorganisation of the cantons of France which came into effect in 2015, the borders of the cantons are no longer related to the borders of the arrondissements. The cantons of the arrondissement of Saint-Nazaire were, as of January 2015:

1. La Baule-Escoublac
2. Bourgneuf-en-Retz
3. Le Croisic
4. Guérande
5. Herbignac
6. Montoir-de-Bretagne
7. Paimboeuf
8. Pontchâteau
9. Pornic
10. Saint-Gildas-des-Bois
11. Saint-Nazaire-Centre
12. Saint-Nazaire-Est
13. Saint-Nazaire-Ouest
14. Saint-Père-en-Retz
15. Savenay
