= Clion =

Clion may refer to:

- Clion, Charente-Maritime, a commune southwestern France
- Clion, Indre, a commune in central France
- CLion, a software product of JetBrains

== See also ==
- Le Clion-sur-Mer, see List of windmills in Loire-Atlantique
