= La Baule – Presqu'île de Guérande =

The Presqu'île de Guérande (French pronunciation: [pʁɛskil də ɡeʁɑ̃d], Guérande Peninsula; Breton: Ledenez Gwenrann) is a coastal area of Brittany, between the Loire estuary and the mouth of the Vilaine. It encompasses about 20 towns split up into two departments: Morbihan and Loire-Atlantique. This area is often called Guérande Peninsula, partly because of Guérande, a scenic town that triggers off images of a medieval town and the salt marshes.

== Geography ==
=== Location ===
Characterized by the diversity of its landscapes, La Baule – Presqu’île de Guérande is bounded by the Atlantic Ocean at the West and the South, by the mouth of the Vilaine at the North, and by the Brière marshland at the East. This area is partly covered by the Brière Nature Park, created in 1970.

=== Towns ===
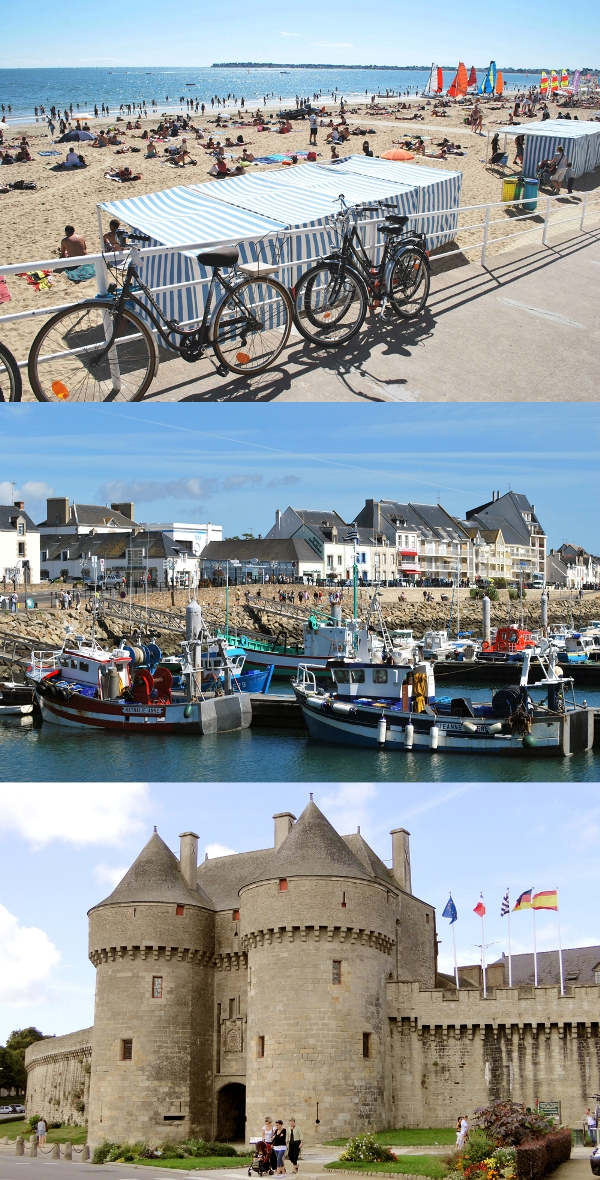
La Baule beach, La Turballe fishing port & Guérande city walls

La Baule – Presqu’île de Guérande is made up of these main towns and cities:

Towns located in Loire-Atlantique

1. Assérac
2. La Baule-Escoublac
3. Batz-sur-Mer
4. Le Croisic
5. Guérande
6. Herbignac
7. Mesquer
8. Piriac-sur-Mer
9. Le Pouliguen
10. Saint-Lyphard
11. Saint-Molf
12. La Turballe
13. Pornichet
14. Saint-André-des-Eaux
15. Missillac

Towns located in Morbihan

1. Camoël
2. Férel
3. Pénestin
4. La Roche-Bernard

=== Adjacent cities ===
1. Saint-Nazaire
2. Pontchâteau

== Traditions and points of interest ==
This region is known for the presence of three elements: salt, the Brière and the sea.

=== Salt ===
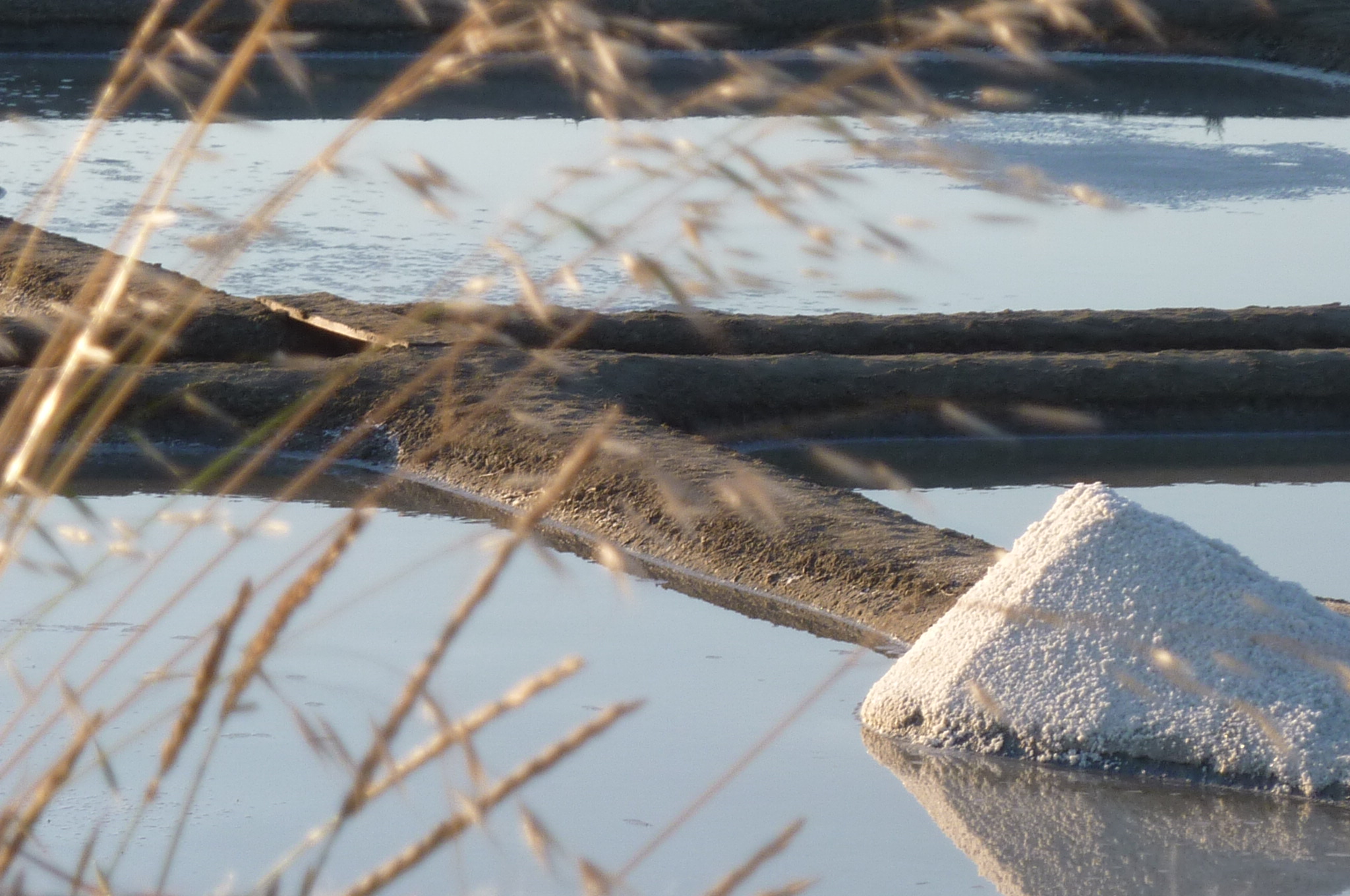
Salt amount in the marshes of Guérande

Famous all over the world, and especially in Japan, Guérande’s fleur de sel is the product which is emblematic of Atlantic destination La Baule – Guérande Peninsula. Down through the centuries, the harvest and the trade of salt have sculpted not just the landscape but also the architecture of the saltworkers’villages, the ports and the areas of fortification. Currently, Guérande Peninsula contains about 2,000 hectares of salt marshes, divided into two salt basins:

- the Batz-Guérande basin, straddling the districts of Batz-sur-Mer, Guérande, La Turballe, Le Croisic and Le Pouliguen.
- the Mès basin in the district of Saint-Molf, Assérac and Mesquer.

=== The Brière ===
The Brière gets its nickname of “Pays noir” (Black Country) from peat, formerly one of its main resources, which results from the decomposition of mosses and plant matter. Light and porous, it used to be a highly sought-after fuel. Clods of peat were cut when the level was at its lowest in mid-July. These were then formed into briquettes and left to dry on mounds in the marshes.

The Brière features an extensive expanse of canals and wetlands, which is distinguished by its freshwater marshland setting. Its vast reed beds serve as a nesting habitat for many species of birds. The landscape and architectural heritage of the region are traditionally explored in a barge, a type of slender, flat-bottomed boat steered using a pole.

The points of interest are:

- The Brière Nature Park
- The specific habitat: the thatched cottages (about 3,000), especially those in the village of Kerhinet, in Saint-Lyphard
- Tours by barge, horse-drawn carriage, or by walking
- Birdwatching

=== The sea ===
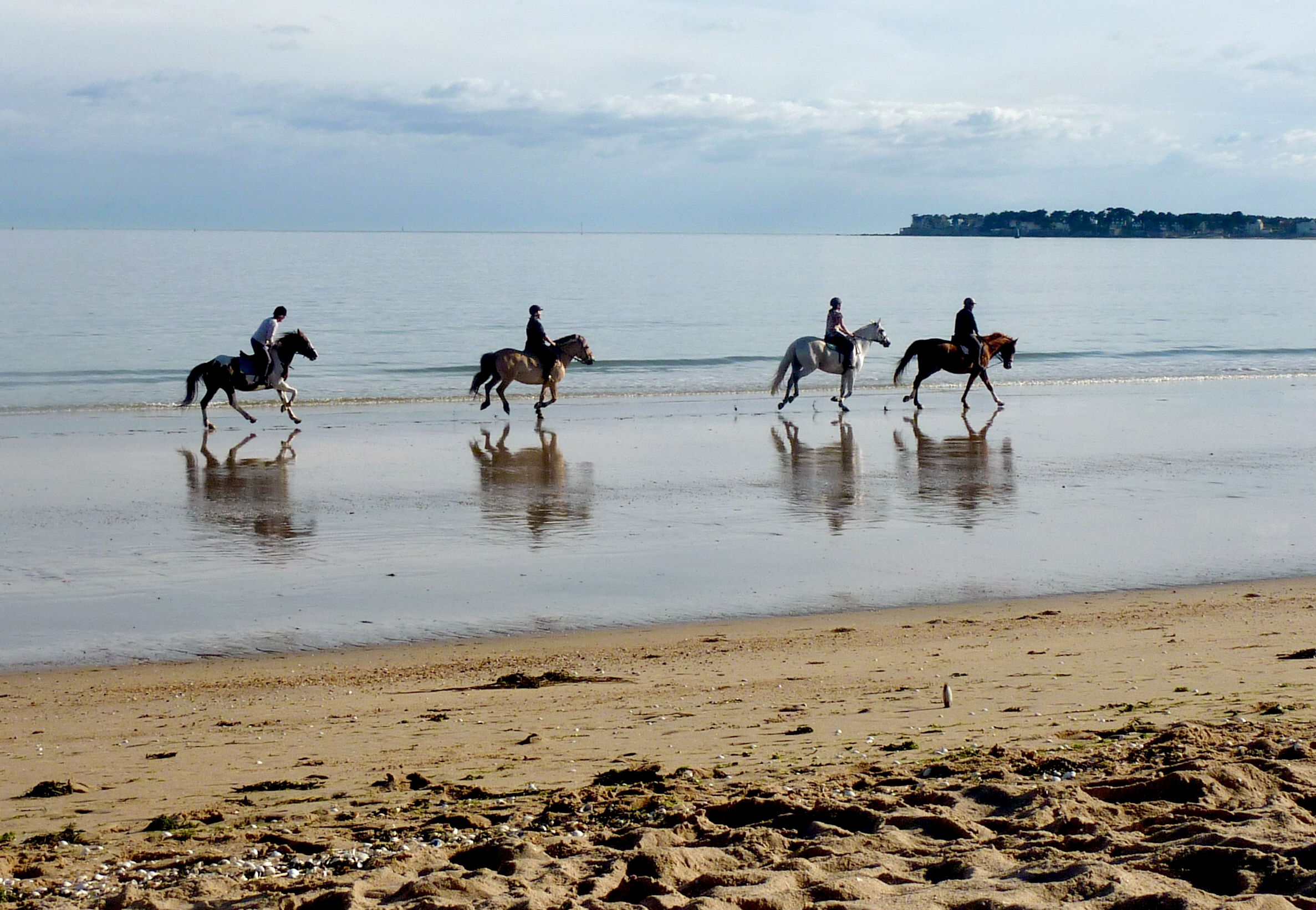
Horses on La Baule beach

- The bay du Pouliguen is one of the star attractions of the area. One of France’s leading large seaside resorts, this bay is also sometimes considered as the most beautiful European beach. The main beach is split between three cities: La Baule, Pornichet and Le Pouliguen.
- Beaches of Batz-sur-Mer, La Turballe, Mesquer and Pénestin
- The fishing ports of Le Croisic and La Turballe

=== Other points of interest ===
- The medieval centre of Guérande (and its city walls)
- Le Croisic, Piriac-sur-Mer, La Roche-Bernard: labelled as Petites Cités de Caractère
- La Baule and its villas

=== Gastronomy ===
- Guérande’s fleur de sel
- Salicornia and seafood
- Salted caramel candy
- Creperies, and other traditional food
- Saveurs d’octobre (October flavours), a food festival each year in October

== See also ==
- Guérande
- La Baule-Escoublac
- Brière
- Communes of the Loire-Atlantique department
- Communes of the Morbihan department
