= Batz-sur-Mer =

Batz-sur-Mer Borg-de-Baz (Gallo) Bourc'h-Baz (Breton)
- Commune
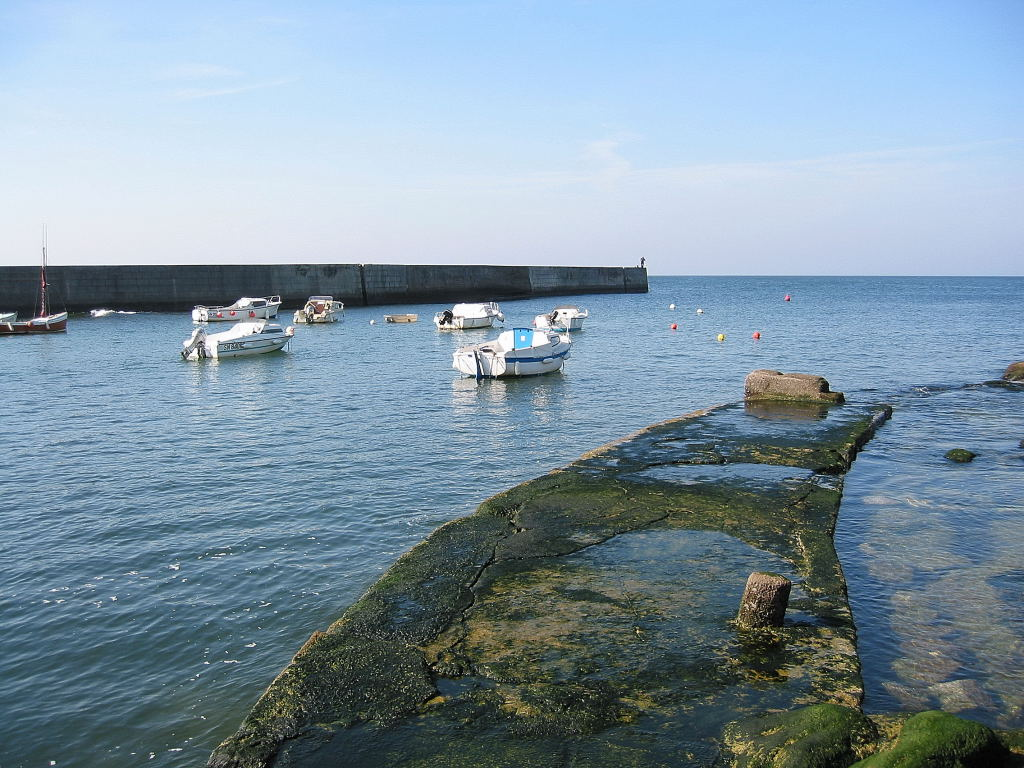

- Coat of arms
- Location of Batz-sur-Mer
- Location within France Location within Pays de la Loire
- Coordinates: 47°16′41″N 2°28′44″W
- Country: France
- Region: Pays de la Loire
- Department: Loire-Atlantique
- Arrondissement: Saint-Nazaire
- Canton: La Baule-Escoublac
- Intercommunality: CA Presqu'île de Guérande Atlantique

Government
  - Mayor (2020–2026): Marie-Catherine Lehuédé
- Area^{1}: 9.27 km^{2} (3.58 sq mi)
- Elevation: 12 m (39 ft)
- Highest elevation: 21 m (69 ft)
- Lowest elevation: 0 m (0 ft)
- Population (2023): 2,892
  - Density: 312/km^{2} (808/sq mi)
- Time zone: UTC+01:00 (CET)
  - Summer (DST): UTC+02:00 (CEST)
- INSEE/Postal code: 44010 /44740
- ^{1} French Land Register data, which excludes lakes, ponds, glaciers > 1 km^{2} (0.386 sq mi or 247 acres) and river estuaries.

Batz-sur-Mer (French pronunciation: [ba syʁ mɛʁ], literally Batz on Sea; Gallo: Borg-de-Baz, Breton: Bourc'h-Baz) is a commune in the Loire-Atlantique department in western France.

The commune is situated on a former island, which until around the 9th century was separate from the mainland at Guérande and the neighbouring island of Le Croisic. The territory of the commune is now part of the wild coast of the Guérande Peninsula with rocky cliffs, sandy beaches along the Atlantic Ocean and extensive salt marshes to the northeast and east.

The town lies between the Bay of Biscay and its salt marshes and is a very Breton town of whitewashed granite houses.

== History ==
In 945 Alan II, Duke of Brittany, founded a priory in Batz-sur-Mer, dedicated to St Winwaloe. Its Benedictine monks developed the local economy and apart from religion they devoted themselves to agriculture and to the maintenance of salt ponds.

The historic church of Saint-Guénolé, or Winwaloe, largely dating from the 15th century, stands in the town centre. The church contains a 16th-century sculpture of the Madonna and Child, and its 17th-century belfry provides a significant local landmark. Climbing to the top of the tower gives a good view over the salt marshes and the Le Croisic peninsula.

Batz was historically part of the Duchy of Brittany and is very near the south-eastern limit of the area in which there is evidence of Breton settlement in the early Middle Ages. The town remained part of Brittany until 1957 and the Breton language (Batz-sur-Mer Breton) was still being spoken there as late as the early 20th century.

In 1834 Balzac stayed in the commune, with Laure de Berny, at the Calme Logis of Madame de La Valette. He wrote there Un drame au bord de la mer, which is set in nearby Le Croisic.

The mathematician Pavel Samuilovich Urysohn drowned while swimming there with his colleague Pavel Alexandrov, who was greatly distressed by his failure to save his friend. Urysohn is buried in Batz-sur-Mer.

The Musée des marais salants (or salt ponds museum) was founded in 1887 by Adèle Pichon, a local nun, after she realized that tourism would put an end to the local way of life, and this is now one of the oldest traditional local museums in France. See The works of Jean Fréour Sculptor of woman carrying salt outside this museum.

== Population ==
Historical population

Year	Pop.	±% p.a.
1793	3,346	—
1821	3,350	+0.00%
1846	3,616	+0.31%
1872	2,733	−1.07%
1901	2,420	−0.42%
1926	1,892	−0.98%
1946	2,284	+0.95%
1962	2,288	+0.01%
1968	2,277	−0.08%

Year	Pop.	±% p.a.
1975	2,236	−0.26%
1982	2,590	+2.12%
1990	2,734	+0.68%
1999	3,049	+1.22%
2007	3,174	+0.50%
2012	3,030	−0.92%
2017	2,906	−0.83%
2023	2,892	−0.08%

Source: EHESS and INSEE (1968-2023)

== Notable people ==
- Francine Caron (born 1945), writer and poet

== See also ==
- La Baule - Guérande Peninsula
- Communes of the Loire-Atlantique department
- Ferdinand du Puigaudeau
