= La Roche-Bernard =

La Roche-Bernard Ar Roc'h-Bernez
- Commune
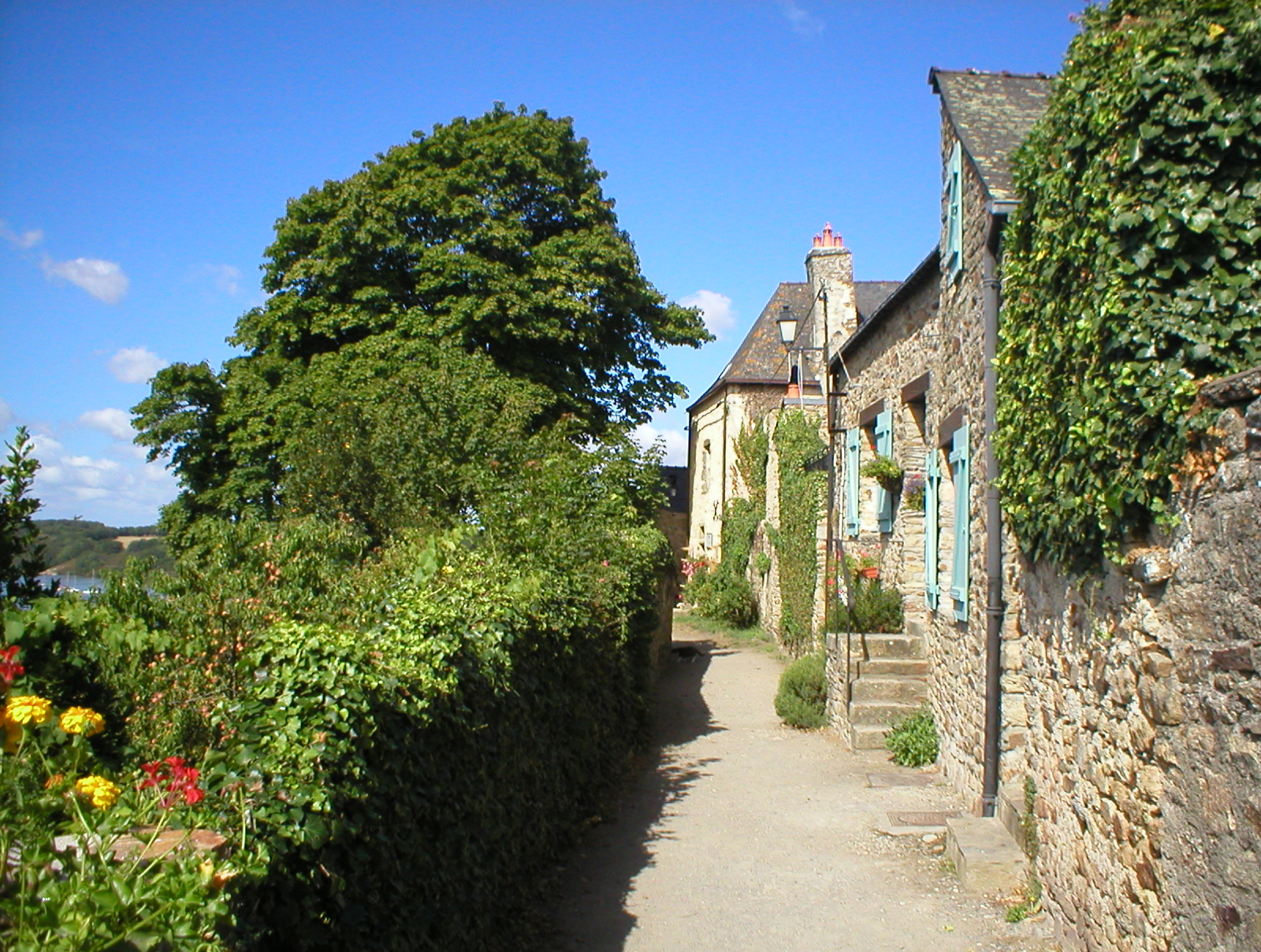
- A street of La Roche-Bernard

- Coat of arms
- Location of La Roche-Bernard
- Location within France Location within Brittany
- Coordinates: 47°31′08″N 2°17′51″W
- Country: France
- Region: Brittany
- Department: Morbihan
- Arrondissement: Vannes
- Canton: Muzillac
- Intercommunality: Arc Sud Bretagne

Government
  - Mayor (2026–32): Bruno Le Borgne
- Area^{1}: 0.43 km^{2} (0.17 sq mi)
- Highest elevation: 58 m (190 ft)
- Lowest elevation: 0 m (0 ft)
- Population (2023): 746
  - Density: 1,700/km^{2} (4,500/sq mi)
- Time zone: UTC+01:00 (CET)
  - Summer (DST): UTC+02:00 (CEST)
- INSEE/Postal code: 56195 /56130
- ^{1} French Land Register data, which excludes lakes, ponds, glaciers > 1 km^{2} (0.386 sq mi or 247 acres) and river estuaries.

La Roche-Bernard (French pronunciation: [la ʁɔʃ bɛʁnaʁ]; Breton: Ar Roc'h-Bernez) is a commune in the Morbihan department of Brittany in north-western France. Inhabitants of La Roche-Bernard are called in French Rochois for men and Rochoises for women.

Forming a part of Petites Cités de Caractère, a quality label, the town is known for its marina along the waterfront of the river named Vilaine and also for its old area.

== Geography ==
The town is located on the south part of Morbihan in Brittany.

== History ==
=== Middle Ages ===
The town was founded in 919 by a Viking chief named Bern-hart. He understood the interest of this strategic defensive place and he decided to fortify the area and settle here. His successors swore allegiance to the duke of Brittany.

During the 1341–1365 War of Succession, the baron decided to help Charles de Blois but at the end of the war, and after Charles de Blois's death, Jean de Montfort decided to destroy his castle.

=== Modern times ===
In the 19th century, the town become an important dock with an apogee between 1880 and 1890 but the economic activity decreased quickly with the development of railway.

Today, La Roche-Bernard is a yachting port with over five hundred private pleasure craft.

== Heritage ==
=== The Old Area ===
- Maritim museum of Vilaine river
- The house of Cannon (Town Hall)
- Notre-Dame Church
- Bouffay Piazza
- Quenelle Street
- Saulnerie Street

=== Natural sites ===
- Vilaine river
- The Rock
- Garennes Garden

=== Bridges ===
- The old bridge of La Roche-Bernard
- The Bridge of La Roche-Bernard
- The Bridge of Morbihan

== See also ==
- Communes of the Morbihan department
- La Baule - Guérande Peninsula
