= Communauté d'agglomération de la Presqu'île de Guérande Atlantique =

Presqu'île de Guérande Atlantique
- Communauté d'agglomération
- Interactive map of Presqu'île de Guérande Atlantique
- Coordinates: 47°23′N 02°24′W
- Country: France
- Region: Brittany, Pays de la Loire
- Department: Loire-Atlantique, Morbihan
- No. of communes: {{{nbcomm}}}
- Established: 2017
- Area: 386.1 km^{2} (149.1 sq mi)
- Population (2019): 75,119
  - Density: 194.6/km^{2} (503.9/sq mi)
- Website: www.cap-atlantique.fr

Communauté d'agglomération de la Presqu'île de Guérande Atlantique (also: Cap Atlantique) is the communauté d'agglomération, an intercommunal structure, centred on the towns of La Baule-Escoublac and Guérande. It is located in the Loire-Atlantique and Morbihan departments, in the Pays de la Loire and Brittany regions, western France. Created in 2017, its seat is in La Baule-Escoublac. Its area is 386.1 km^{2}. Its population was 75,119 in 2019.

== Composition ==
The communauté d'agglomération consists of the following 15 communes, of which 3 (Camoël, Férel and Pénestin) in the Morbihan department:

1. Assérac
2. Batz-sur-Mer
3. La Baule-Escoublac
4. Camoël
5. Le Croisic
6. Férel
7. Guérande
8. Herbignac
9. Mesquer
10. Pénestin
11. Piriac-sur-Mer
12. Le Pouliguen
13. Saint-Lyphard
14. Saint-Molf
15. La Turballe
