= Le Pouliguen =

Le Pouliguen Ar Poulgwenn
- Commune
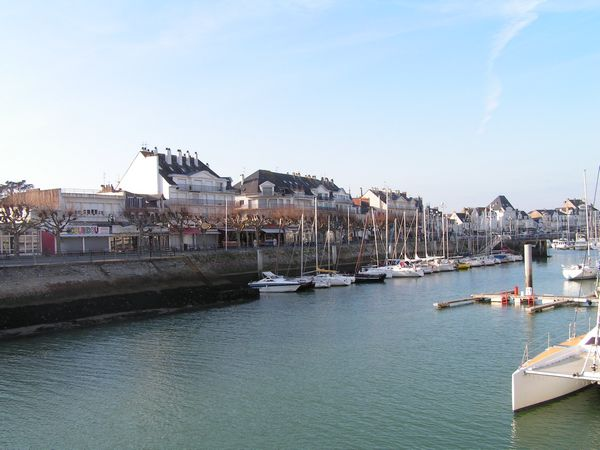
- Port and promenade

- Coat of arms
- Location of Le Pouliguen
- Location within France Location within Pays de la Loire
- Coordinates: 47°16′40″N 2°25′45″W
- Country: France
- Region: Pays de la Loire
- Department: Loire-Atlantique
- Arrondissement: Saint-Nazaire
- Canton: La Baule-Escoublac
- Intercommunality: CA Presqu'île de Guérande Atlantique

Government
  - Mayor (2020–2026): Norbert Samama
- Area^{1}: 4.39 km^{2} (1.69 sq mi)
- Highest elevation: 23 m (75 ft)
- Lowest elevation: 0 m (0 ft)
- Population (2023): 4,173
  - Density: 951/km^{2} (2,460/sq mi)
- Demonym: Pouliguennais
- Time zone: UTC+01:00 (CET)
  - Summer (DST): UTC+02:00 (CEST)
- INSEE/Postal code: 44135 /44510
- ^{1} French Land Register data, which excludes lakes, ponds, glaciers > 1 km^{2} (0.386 sq mi or 247 acres) and river estuaries.

Le Pouliguen (French pronunciation: [lə puliɡɛ̃]; Breton: Ar Poulgwenn) is a commune of western France, located in the Loire-Atlantique department, Pays de la Loire. Le Pouliguen is situated between La Baule-Escoublac and Batz-sur-Mer.

== Port ==
The port is located at the border between Le Pouliguen and La Baule-Escoublac. It comprises three basins and three bridges, and mostly welcomes fishing boats and leisure boats. The port is located on a channel that feeds into the "Marais Salants".

In recent years, the port has had issues with silting, with large amounts of sand building up at the bottom of the port. This causes issues for boats trying to enter the port at low tide. Some believe that this can be linked back to the construction of the Port of Pornichet, which has changed the tides and caused large amounts of sand to end up in the port of the Pouliguen.

== Demographics ==
=== Housing ===
In 2019:

Statistic Description	Value
Number of housing units	6503
Share of primary residence, %	33,7
Share of secondary residences, %	63.3
Empty houses, %	2.9
Share of residents owners of their primary residence, %	69.3

=== Population ===
Historical population

Year	Pop.	±% p.a.
1856	868	—
1872	969	+0.69%
1901	1,505	+1.53%
1926	2,013	+1.17%
1946	5,148	+4.81%
1962	3,658	−2.11%
1968	3,788	+0.58%
1975	4,276	+1.75%

Year	Pop.	±% p.a.
1982	4,383	+0.35%
1990	4,912	+1.43%
1999	5,266	+0.78%
2007	5,199	−0.16%
2012	4,810	−1.54%
2017	4,275	−2.33%
2023	4,173	−0.40%

Source: EHESS and INSEE (1968-2023)

== Notable Places ==
- Town hall
- Crêperie Barapom du Pouliguen
- Port
- Plage du Nau (beach)
- Côte Sauvage (bike/walk path along the coast)
- Petit bois (parc)

== International relations ==
It is twinned with Llantwit Major, Vale of Glamorgan, Wales.

== See also ==
- La Baule – Presqu'île de Guérande
- Communes of the Loire-Atlantique department
- Jean Fréour
