= La Turballe =

- Commune
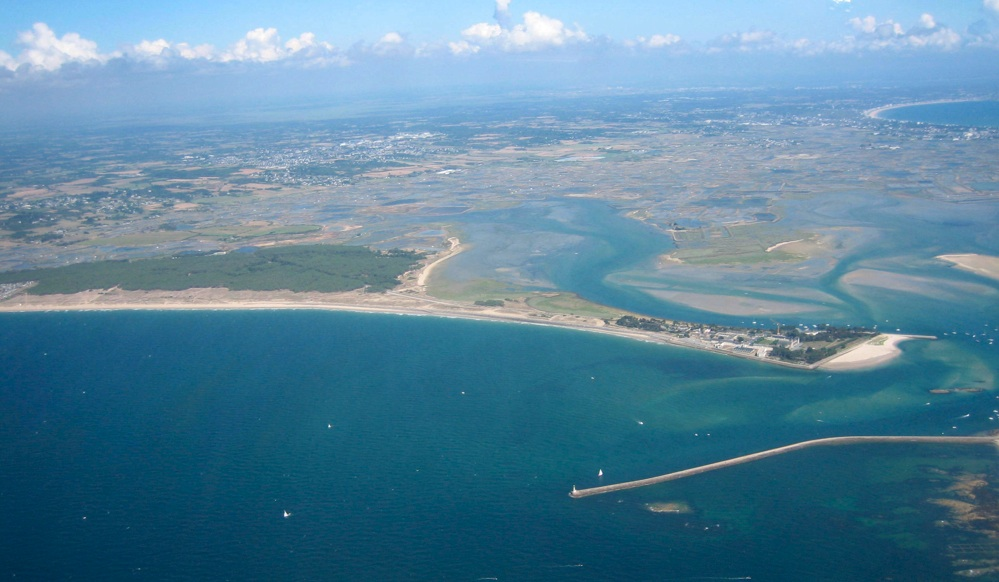
- An aerial view of Pen-Bron, in La Turballe

- Coat of arms
- Location of La Turballe
- Location within France Location within Pays de la Loire
- Coordinates: 47°20′47″N 2°30′20″W
- Country: France
- Region: Pays de la Loire
- Department: Loire-Atlantique
- Arrondissement: Saint-Nazaire
- Canton: Guérande
- Intercommunality: CA Presqu'île de Guérande Atlantique

Government
  - Mayor (2020–2026): Didier Cadro
- Area^{1}: 18.53 km^{2} (7.15 sq mi)
- Elevation: 6 m (20 ft)
- Highest elevation: 45 m (148 ft)
- Lowest elevation: 0 m (0 ft)
- Population (2023): 4,850
  - Density: 262/km^{2} (678/sq mi)
- Demonym(s): Turballais, Turballaise
- Time zone: UTC+01:00 (CET)
  - Summer (DST): UTC+02:00 (CEST)
- INSEE/Postal code: 44211 /44420
- ^{1} French Land Register data, which excludes lakes, ponds, glaciers > 1 km^{2} (0.386 sq mi or 247 acres) and river estuaries.

La Turballe (French pronunciation: [la tyʁbal]; Breton: An Turball) is a commune in the Loire-Atlantique department in western France. This commune is known for its harbor, which is the first fishing harbor in the region. Every summer, there is a sardine party (fête de la sardine in French).

La Turballe is close to the La Baule seaside resort.

The town, located on the Côte d'Amour, has 11 kilometers of beaches.

== Population ==
Historical population
Year	Pop.	±% p.a.
1968	2,716	—
1975	2,959	+1.23%
1982	3,120	+0.76%
1990	3,587	+1.76%
1999	4,042	+1.34%
2007	4,384	+1.02%
2012	4,554	+0.76%
2017	4,426	−0.57%
2023	4,850	+1.54%
Source: INSEE

== See also ==
- La Baule - Guérande Peninsula
- Communes of the Loire-Atlantique department
- Port of La Turballe
