= Herbignac =

Herbignac Èrbinyac (Gallo) Erbigneg (Breton)
- Commune
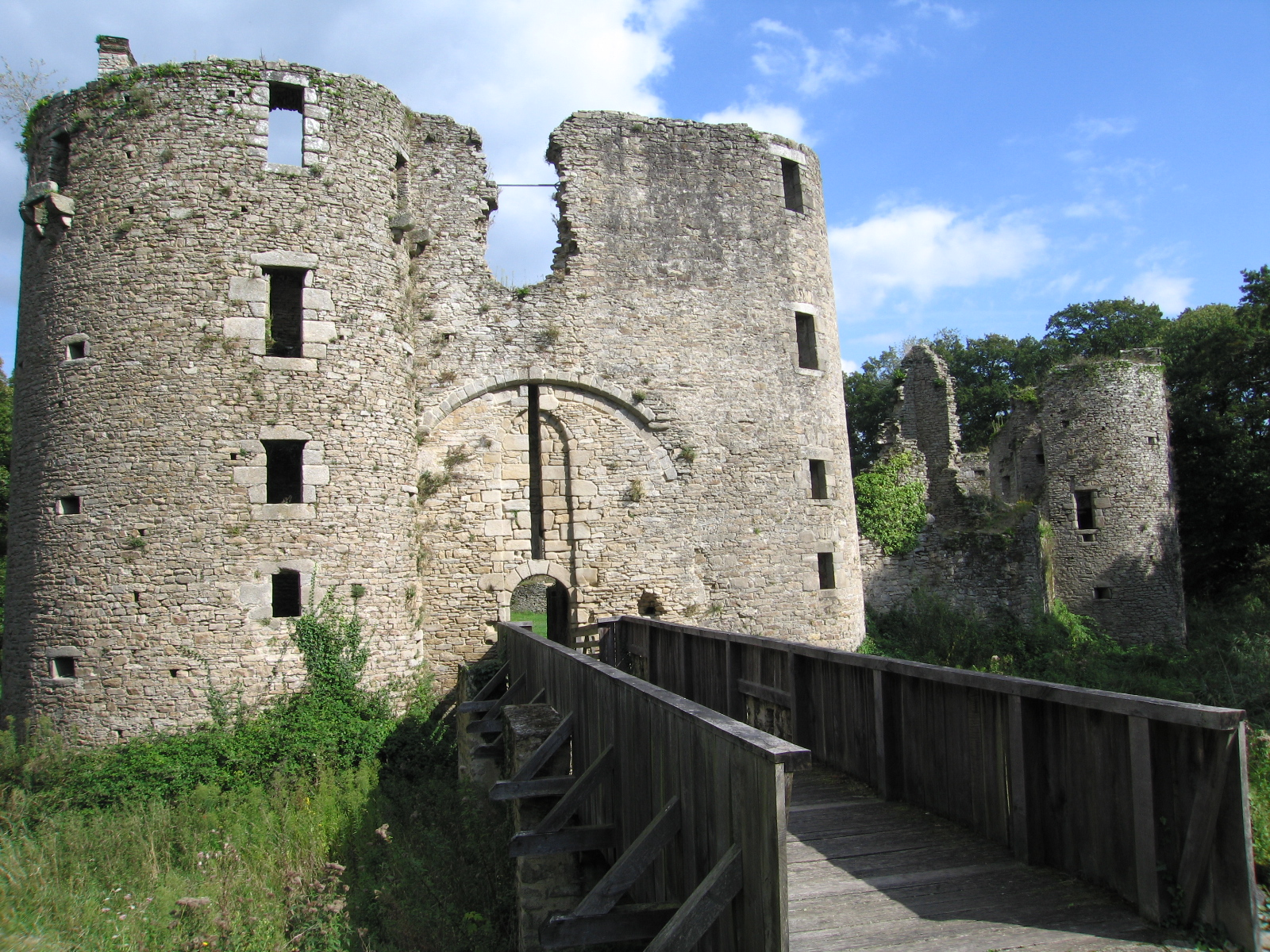
- Château de Ranrouët

- Coat of arms
- Location of Herbignac
- Location within France Location within Pays de la Loire
- Coordinates: 47°26′59″N 2°18′58″W
- Country: France
- Region: Pays de la Loire
- Department: Loire-Atlantique
- Arrondissement: Saint-Nazaire
- Canton: Guérande
- Intercommunality: CA Presqu'île de Guérande Atlantique

Government
  - Mayor (2020–2026): Christelle Chassé
- Area^{1}: 71.43 km^{2} (27.58 sq mi)
- Elevation: 15 m (49 ft)
- Highest elevation: 55 m (180 ft)
- Lowest elevation: 0 m (0 ft)
- Population (2023): 7,224
  - Density: 101.1/km^{2} (261.9/sq mi)
- Time zone: UTC+01:00 (CET)
  - Summer (DST): UTC+02:00 (CEST)
- INSEE/Postal code: 44072 /44410
- ^{1} French Land Register data, which excludes lakes, ponds, glaciers > 1 km^{2} (0.386 sq mi or 247 acres) and river estuaries.

Herbignac (French pronunciation: [ɛʁbiɲak]; Gallo: Èrbinyac, Breton: Erbigneg) is a commune in the Loire-Atlantique department in western France.

== Population ==
Historical population

Year	Pop.	±% p.a.
1793	2,755	—
1800	2,086	−3.90%
1806	1,999	−0.71%
1821	2,920	+2.56%
1831	3,175	+0.84%
1841	3,176	+0.00%
1846	3,327	+0.93%
1851	3,555	+1.33%
1856	3,478	−0.44%
1861	3,672	+1.09%
1866	3,784	+0.60%
1872	3,895	+0.48%
1876	3,964	+0.44%
1881	4,152	+0.93%
1886	4,153	+0.00%
1891	4,219	+0.32%
1896	4,199	−0.09%
1901	4,172	−0.13%

Year	Pop.	±% p.a.
1906	4,150	−0.11%
1911	4,110	−0.19%
1921	3,540	−1.48%
1926	3,443	−0.55%
1931	3,416	−0.16%
1936	3,325	−0.54%
1946	3,122	−0.63%
1954	3,028	−0.38%
1962	3,037	+0.04%
1968	3,078	+0.22%
1975	3,239	+0.73%
1982	3,778	+2.22%
1990	4,175	+1.26%
1999	4,353	+0.46%
2007	5,184	+2.21%
2012	6,175	+3.56%
2017	6,822	+2.01%
2023	7,224	+0.96%

Source: EHESS and INSEE (1968-2023)

== See also ==
- Château de Ranrouët
- La Baule - Guérande Peninsula
- Communes of the Loire-Atlantique department
- Parc naturel régional de Brière
