= Saint-Lyphard =

- Commune
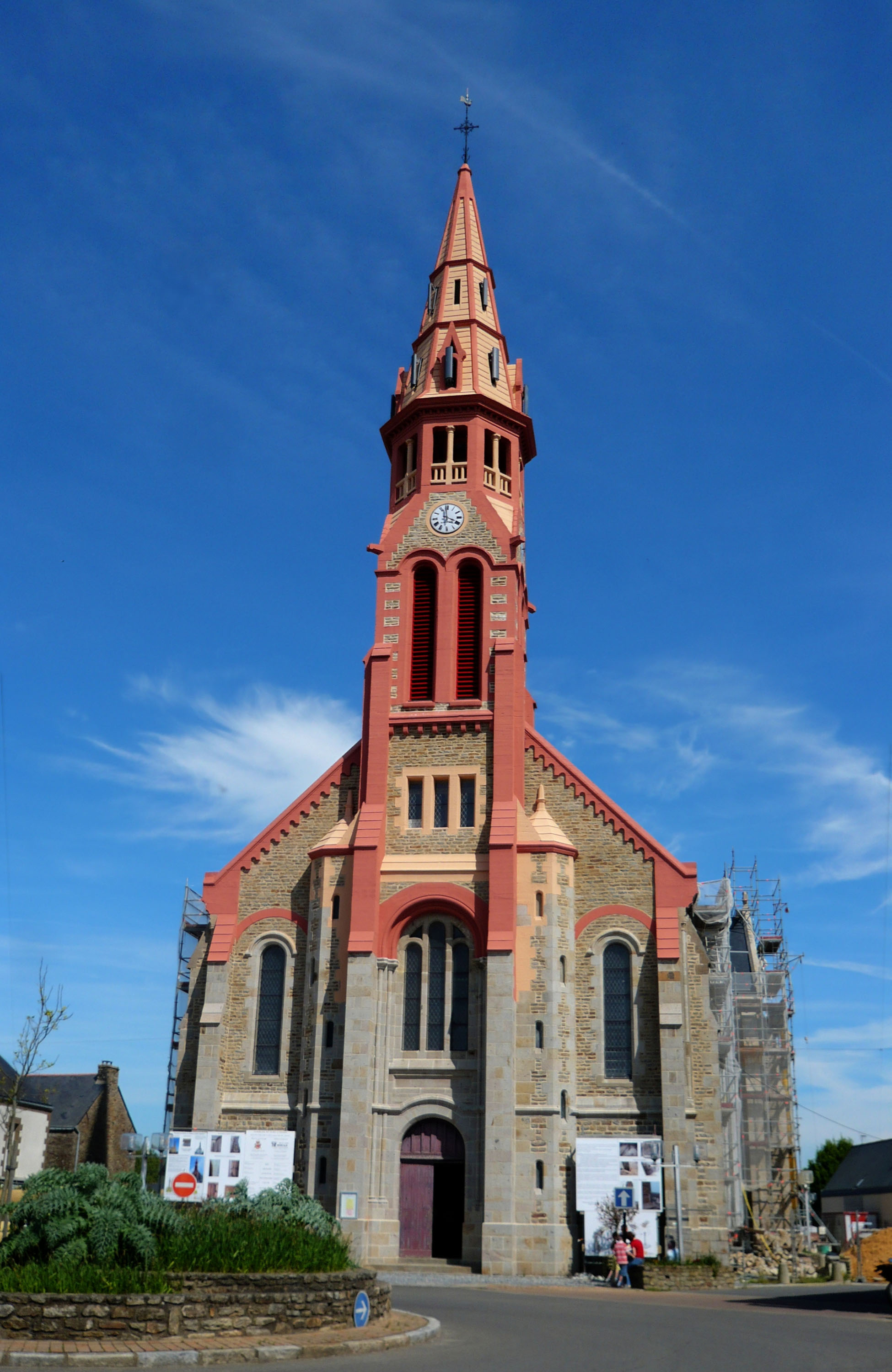
- The church in Saint-Lyphard

- Coat of arms
- Location of Saint-Lyphard
- Location within France Location within Pays de la Loire
- Coordinates: 47°23′55″N 2°18′23″W
- Country: France
- Region: Pays de la Loire
- Department: Loire-Atlantique
- Arrondissement: Saint-Nazaire
- Canton: Guérande
- Intercommunality: CA Presqu'île de Guérande Atlantique

Government
  - Mayor (2020–2026): Claude Bodet
- Area^{1}: 24.63 km^{2} (9.51 sq mi)
- Elevation: 12 m (39 ft)
- Highest elevation: 23 m (75 ft)
- Lowest elevation: 0 m (0 ft)
- Population (2023): 5,304
  - Density: 215.3/km^{2} (557.7/sq mi)
- Time zone: UTC+01:00 (CET)
  - Summer (DST): UTC+02:00 (CEST)
- INSEE/Postal code: 44175 /44410
- ^{1} French Land Register data, which excludes lakes, ponds, glaciers > 1 km^{2} (0.386 sq mi or 247 acres) and river estuaries.

Saint-Lyphard (French pronunciation: [sɛ̃ lifaʁ]; Breton: Sant-Lefer) is a commune in the Loire-Atlantique department in western France. It is named after Saint Liphardus, a 6th-century AD abbot of the monastery established at Meung-sur-Loire.

== Population ==
Historical population
Year	Pop.	±% p.a.
1968	1,357	—
1975	1,554	+1.96%
1982	2,364	+6.18%
1990	2,889	+2.54%
1999	3,178	+1.06%
2007	4,126	+3.32%
2012	4,401	+1.30%
2017	4,760	+1.58%
2023	5,304	+1.82%
Source: INSEE

== See also ==
- La Baule - Guérande Peninsula
- Communes of the Loire-Atlantique department
- Parc naturel régional de Brière
