= Saint-Molf =

- Commune
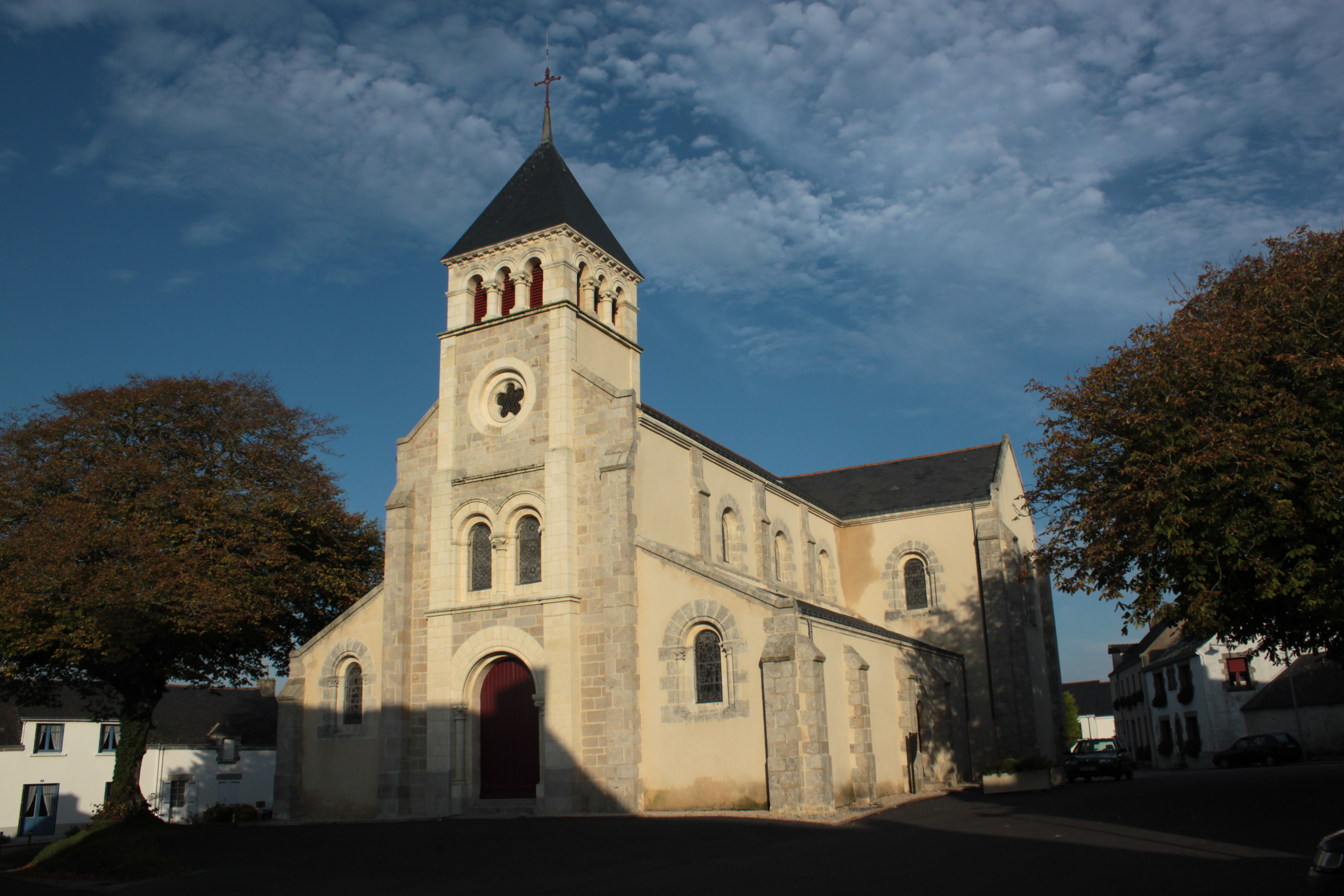
- The church in Saint-Molf

- Coat of arms
- Location of Saint-Molf
- Location within France Location within Pays de la Loire
- Coordinates: 47°23′31″N 2°25′26″W
- Country: France
- Region: Pays de la Loire
- Department: Loire-Atlantique
- Arrondissement: Saint-Nazaire
- Canton: Guérande
- Intercommunality: CA Presqu'île de Guérande Atlantique

Government
  - Mayor (2020–2026): Hubert Delorme
- Area^{1}: 22.82 km^{2} (8.81 sq mi)
- Elevation: 15 m (49 ft)
- Highest elevation: 30 m (98 ft)
- Lowest elevation: 0 m (0 ft)
- Population (2023): 2,870
  - Density: 126/km^{2} (326/sq mi)
- Time zone: UTC+01:00 (CET)
  - Summer (DST): UTC+02:00 (CEST)
- INSEE/Postal code: 44183 /44350
- ^{1} French Land Register data, which excludes lakes, ponds, glaciers > 1 km^{2} (0.386 sq mi or 247 acres) and river estuaries.

Saint-Molf (French pronunciation: [sɛ̃ mɔlf]; Breton: Sant-Molf) is a commune in the Loire-Atlantique department in western France.

== Population ==
Historical population
Year	Pop.	±% p.a.
1968	690	—
1975	706	+0.33%
1982	852	+2.72%
1990	1,154	+3.87%
1999	1,501	+2.96%
2007	2,104	+4.31%
2012	2,408	+2.74%
2017	2,622	+1.72%
2023	2,870	+1.52%
Source: INSEE

== See also ==
- La Baule - Guérande Peninsula
- Communes of the Loire-Atlantique department
- Parc naturel régional de Brière
