= Mesquer =

Mesquer Mèsqé (Gallo) Mesker (Breton)
- Commune
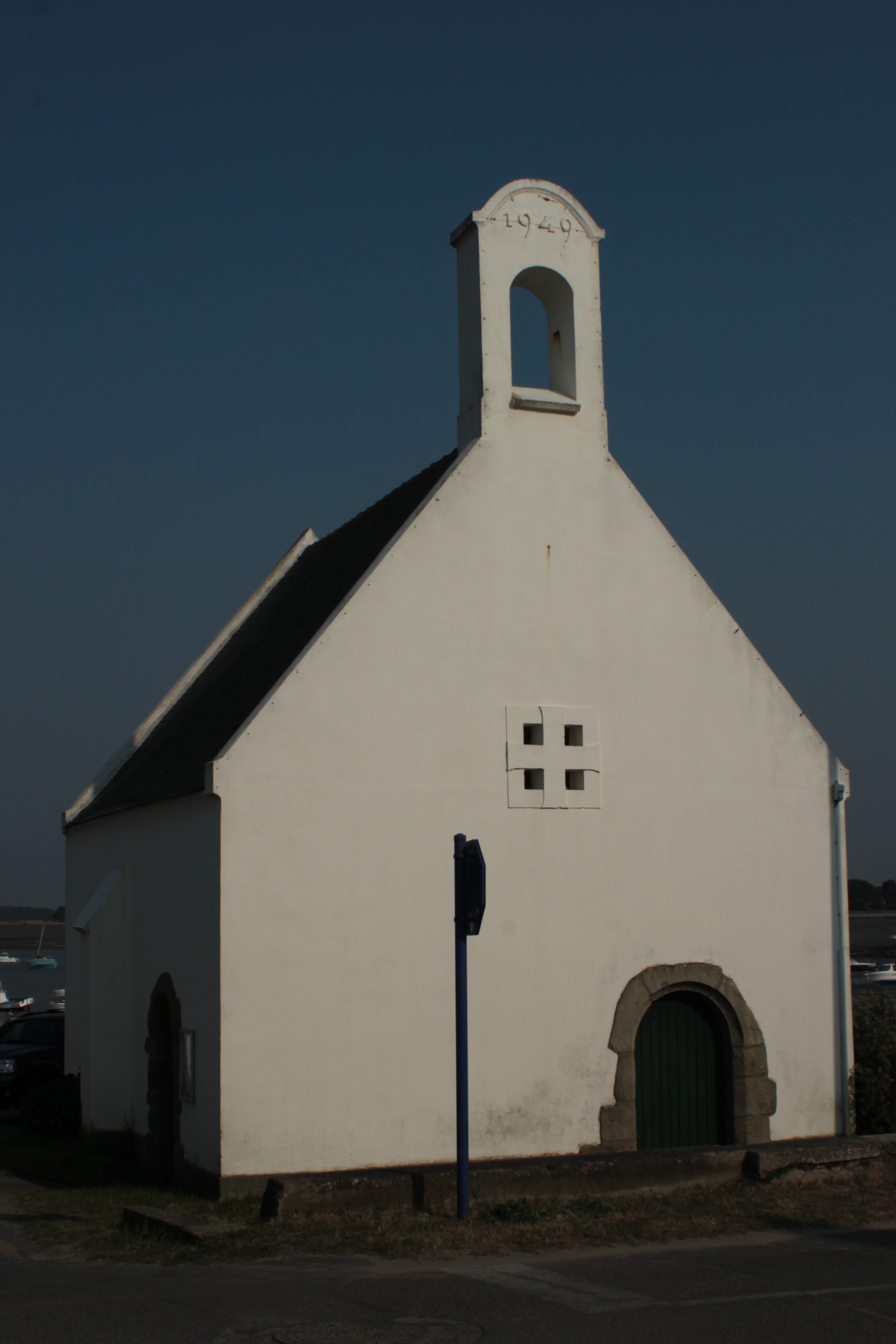
- Chapel of Our Lady of Kercabellec, built in 1949

- Coat of arms
- Location of Mesquer
- Location within France Location within Pays de la Loire
- Coordinates: 47°24′01″N 2°27′31″W
- Country: France
- Region: Pays de la Loire
- Department: Loire-Atlantique
- Arrondissement: Saint-Nazaire
- Canton: Guérande
- Intercommunality: CA Presqu'île de Guérande Atlantique

Government
  - Mayor (2020–2026): Jean-Pierre Bernard
- Area^{1}: 16.72 km^{2} (6.46 sq mi)
- Elevation: 6 m (20 ft)
- Highest elevation: 34 m (112 ft)
- Lowest elevation: 0 m (0 ft)
- Population (2023): 2,171
  - Density: 129.8/km^{2} (336.3/sq mi)
- Time zone: UTC+01:00 (CET)
  - Summer (DST): UTC+02:00 (CEST)
- INSEE/Postal code: 44097 /44420
- ^{1} French Land Register data, which excludes lakes, ponds, glaciers > 1 km^{2} (0.386 sq mi or 247 acres) and river estuaries.

Mesquer (French pronunciation: [mɛskɛʁ]; Gallo: Mésqè, Breton: Mesker) is a commune in the Loire-Atlantique department in western France.

== Population ==
Historical population

Year	Pop.	±% p.a.
1793	1,235	—
1821	1,478	+0.64%
1846	1,713	+0.59%
1872	1,814	+0.22%
1901	1,388	−0.92%
1926	1,090	−0.96%
1946	960	−0.63%
1962	1,034	+0.47%
1968	1,019	−0.24%

Year	Pop.	±% p.a.
1975	1,015	−0.06%
1982	1,201	+2.43%
1990	1,372	+1.68%
1999	1,467	+0.75%
2007	1,681	+1.72%
2012	1,759	+0.91%
2017	1,941	+1.99%
2023	2,171	+1.88%

Source: EHESS and INSEE (1968-2023)

== See also ==
- La Baule - Guérande Peninsula
- Communes of the Loire-Atlantique department
- The works of Jean Fréour Sculptor with works in Mesquer
