= Canton of La Baule-Escoublac =

Coordinates: 47.29°N 2.39°W

The canton of La Baule-Escoublac is an administrative division of the Loire-Atlantique department, western France. Its borders were modified at the French canton reorganisation which came into effect in March 2015. Its seat is in La Baule-Escoublac.

It consists of the following communes:

1. Batz-sur-Mer
2. La Baule-Escoublac
3. Le Croisic
4. Pornichet
5. Le Pouliguen
6. Saint-André-des-Eaux
