= Canton of Guérande =

Coordinates: 47.33°N 2.43°W

The canton of Guérande is an administrative division of the Loire-Atlantique department, western France. Its borders were modified at the French canton reorganisation which came into effect in March 2015. Its seat is in Guérande.

It consists of the following communes:

1. Assérac
2. La Chapelle-des-Marais
3. Guérande
4. Herbignac
5. Mesquer
6. Piriac-sur-Mer
7. Saint-Joachim
8. Saint-Lyphard
9. Saint-Molf
10. La Turballe
