= Pénestin =

Pénestin Pennestin
- Commune
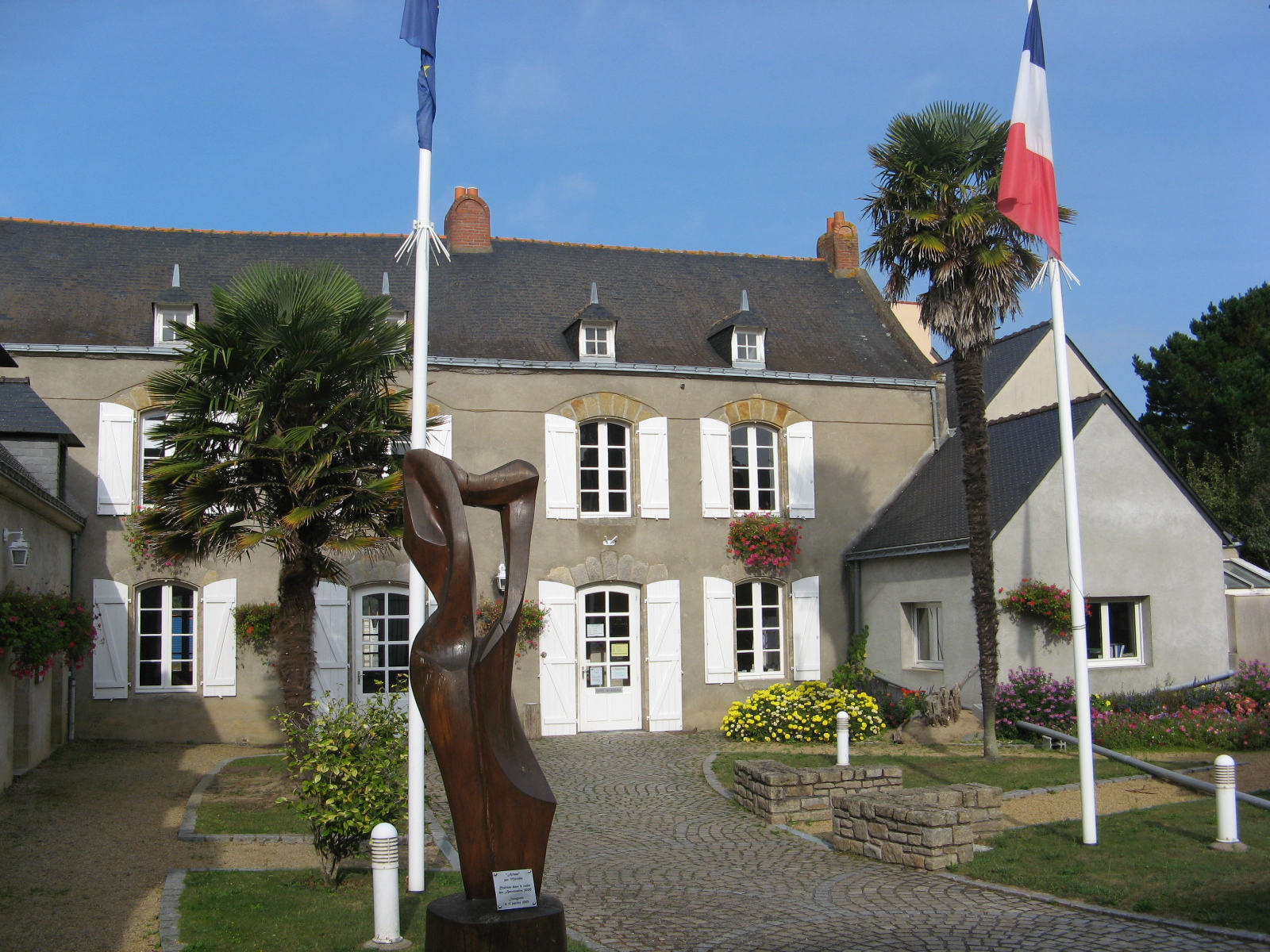
- The town hall in Pénestin

- Coat of arms
- Location of Pénestin
- Location within France Location within Brittany
- Coordinates: 47°29′01″N 2°28′24″W
- Country: France
- Region: Brittany
- Department: Morbihan
- Arrondissement: Vannes
- Canton: Muzillac
- Intercommunality: CA Presqu'île de Guérande Atlantique

Government
  - Mayor (2026–32): Christian Mahe
- Area^{1}: 21.69 km^{2} (8.37 sq mi)
- Highest elevation: 38 m (125 ft)
- Lowest elevation: 0 m (0 ft)
- Population (2023): 2,085
  - Density: 96.13/km^{2} (249.0/sq mi)
- Time zone: UTC+01:00 (CET)
  - Summer (DST): UTC+02:00 (CEST)
- INSEE/Postal code: 56155 /56760
- ^{1} French Land Register data, which excludes lakes, ponds, glaciers > 1 km^{2} (0.386 sq mi or 247 acres) and river estuaries.

Pénestin (French pronunciation: [penetɛ̃]; Breton: Pennestin) is a commune in the Morbihan department of Brittany in north-western France.

== Geography ==
Pénestin is located in Guérande Peninsula, 29 km (18 mi) southeast of Vannes and 75 km (47 mi) northwest of Nantes. The mouth of the river Vilaine forms a natural bourndary to the north. Historically, Pénestin belongs to Lower Brittany. As Penestin lies on the coast, it boasts several beaches, the most popular of which are La Mine d'Or and Loscolo.

=== Map ===
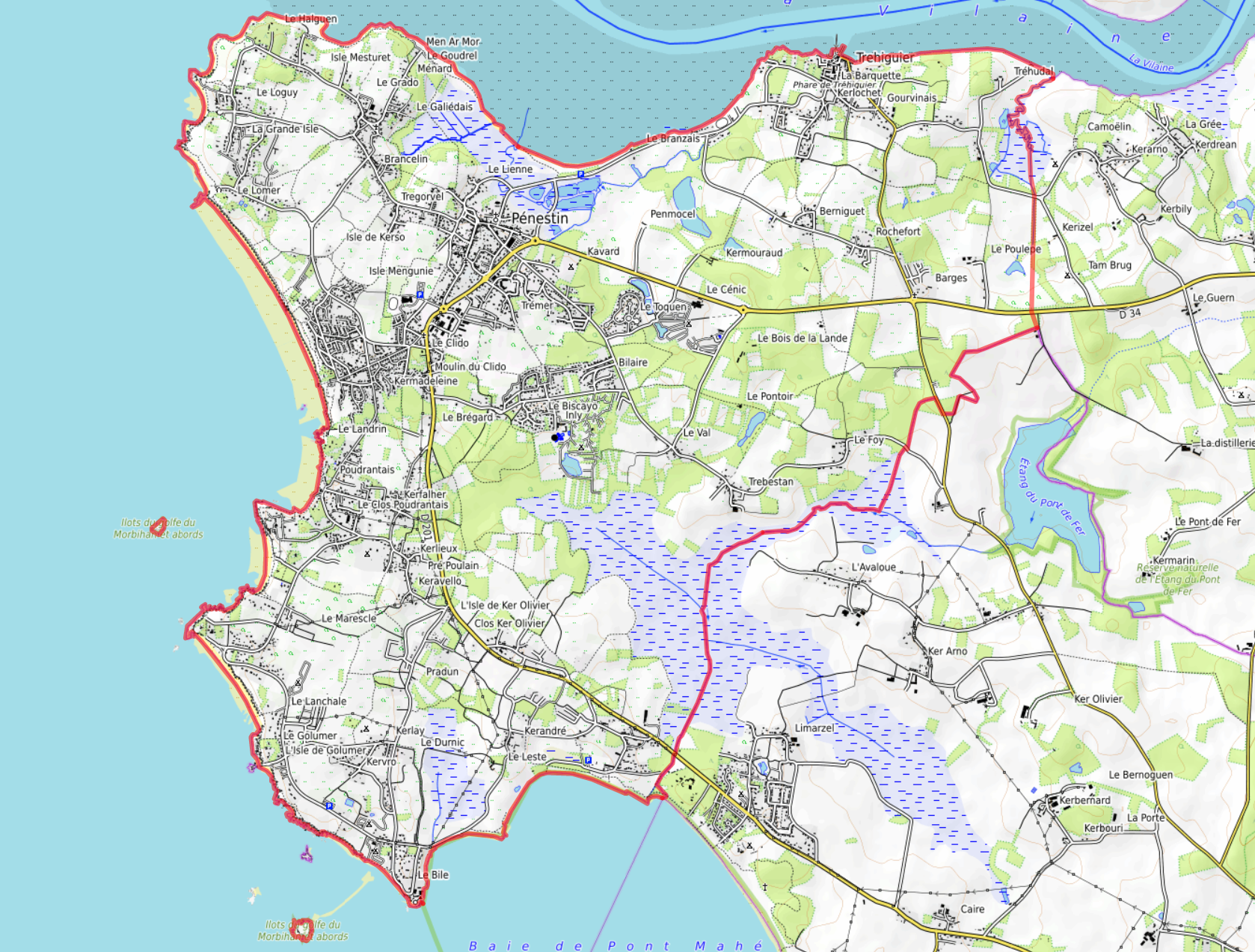
Topographic map

== Population ==
Historical population
Year	Pop.	±% p.a.
1968	1,078	—
1975	1,192	+1.45%
1982	1,299	+1.24%
1990	1,394	+0.89%
1999	1,527	+1.02%
2007	1,813	+2.17%
2012	1,827	+0.15%
2017	1,946	+1.27%
2023	2,085	+1.16%
Source: INSEE

Inhabitants of Pénestin are called in French Pénestinois.

== Language ==
Until the beginning of the nineteen's century, the spoken language was breton. Most of the hamlets have breton names.

== Tourism ==
Pénestin is a very popular seaside resort. As of 2020, 71.1% of the properties are holiday homes, one of the highest percentage in Morbihan.

== See also ==
- La Baule - Guérande Peninsula
- Communes of the Morbihan department
