= Piriac-sur-Mer =

- Commune
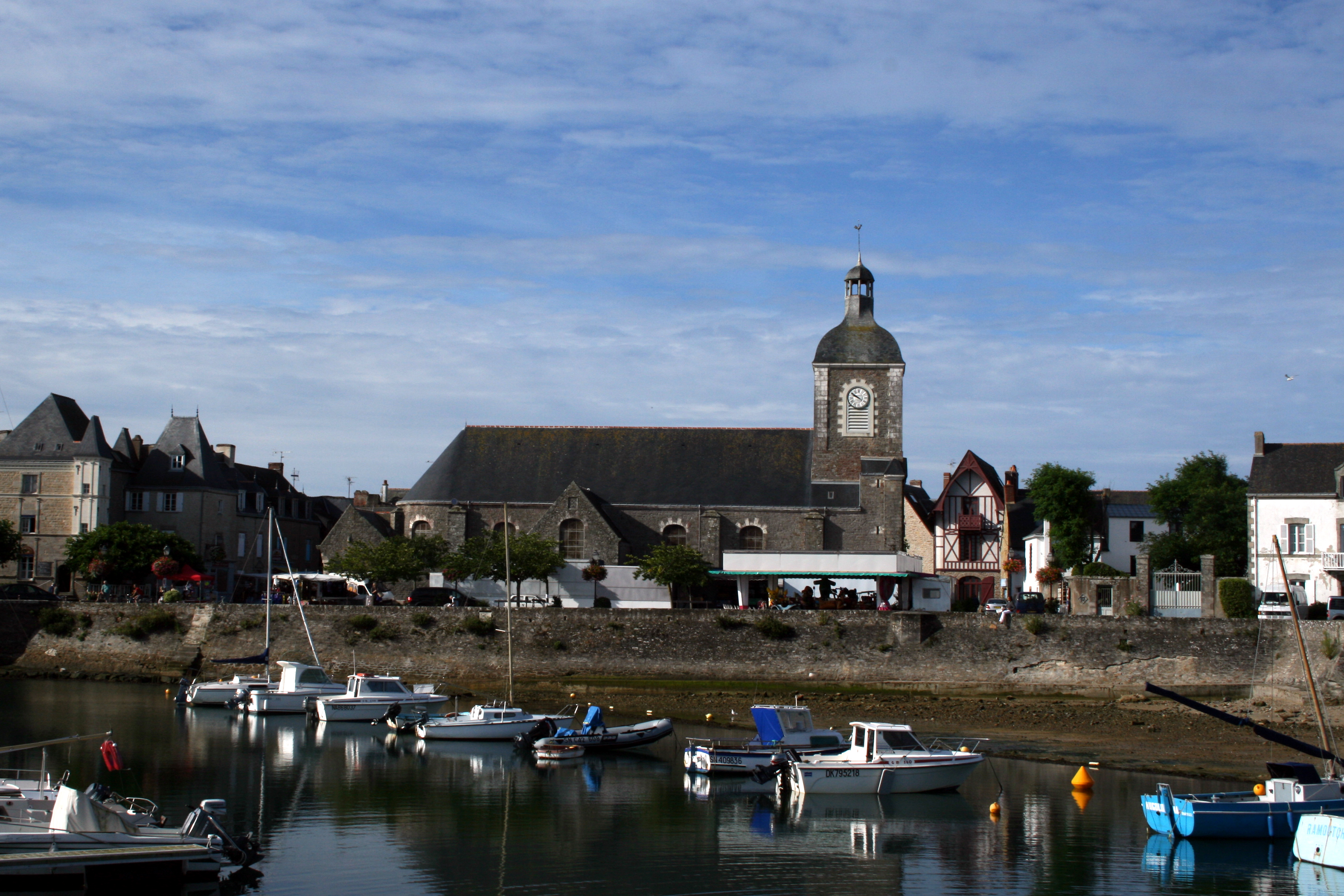

- Coat of arms
- Location of Piriac-sur-Mer
- Location within France Location within Pays de la Loire
- Coordinates: 47°22′51″N 2°32′42″W
- Country: France
- Region: Pays de la Loire
- Department: Loire-Atlantique
- Arrondissement: Saint-Nazaire
- Canton: Guérande
- Intercommunality: CA Presqu'île de Guérande Atlantique

Government
  - Mayor (2026–32): Emmanuelle Dacheux
- Area^{1}: 12.37 km^{2} (4.78 sq mi)
- Elevation: 3 m (9.8 ft)
- Highest elevation: 36 m (118 ft)
- Lowest elevation: 0 m (0 ft)
- Population (2023): 2,685
  - Density: 217.1/km^{2} (562.2/sq mi)
- Time zone: UTC+01:00 (CET)
  - Summer (DST): UTC+02:00 (CEST)
- INSEE/Postal code: 44125 /44420
- ^{1} French Land Register data, which excludes lakes, ponds, glaciers > 1 km^{2} (0.386 sq mi or 247 acres) and river estuaries.

Piriac-sur-Mer (French pronunciation: [piʁjak syʁ mɛʁ], literally Piriac on Sea; Breton: Penc'herieg) is a commune in the Loire-Atlantique department in western France.

== Population ==
Historical population

Year	Pop.	±% p.a.
1793	1,054	—
1821	1,056	+0.01%
1846	1,266	+0.73%
1872	1,310	+0.13%
1901	1,301	−0.02%
1926	1,166	−0.44%
1946	1,109	−0.25%
1962	1,127	+0.10%
1968	1,134	+0.10%

Year	Pop.	±% p.a.
1975	1,110	−0.31%
1982	1,263	+1.86%
1990	1,442	+1.67%
1999	1,898	+3.10%
2007	2,273	+2.28%
2012	2,173	−0.90%
2017	2,245	+0.65%
2023	2,685	+3.03%

Source: EHESS and INSEE (1968-2023)

== See also ==
- La Baule - Guérande Peninsula
- Communes of the Loire-Atlantique department
