= Vilaine =

River in France

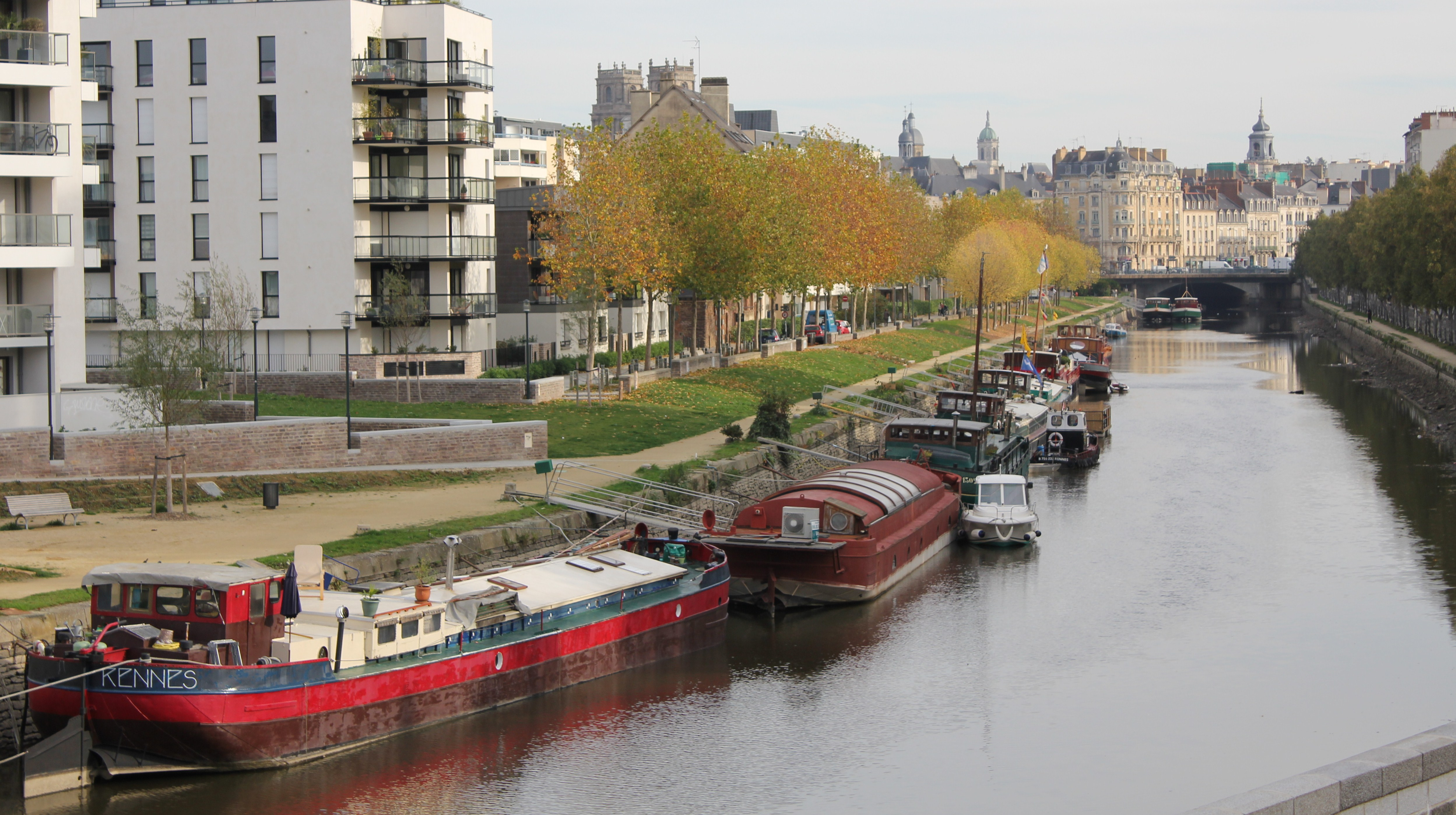
- The Vilaine in Rennes.

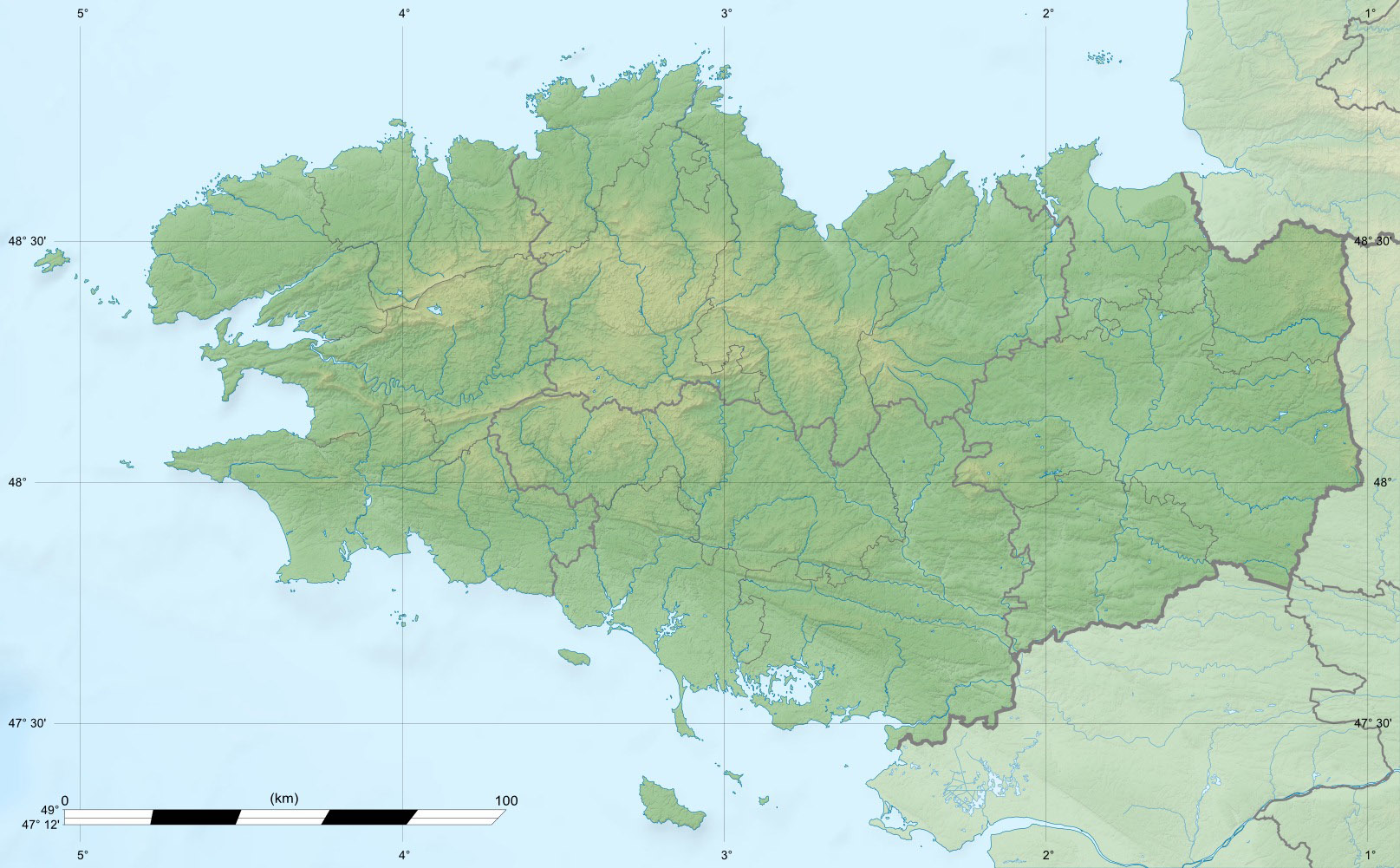
- Native name: La Vilaine (French)

Location
- Country: France

Physical characteristics
- Source
  - location: Juvigné, Mayenne
  - coordinates: 48°13′46″N 01°03′11″W
  - elevation: 175 m (574 ft)
- Mouth
  - location: Atlantic Ocean
  - coordinates: 47°30′20″N 2°29′57″W
- Length: 218.1 km (135.5 mi)
- Basin size: 10,882 km^{2} (4,202 sq mi)
- Discharge
  - average: 80 m^{3}/s (2,800 cu ft/s)

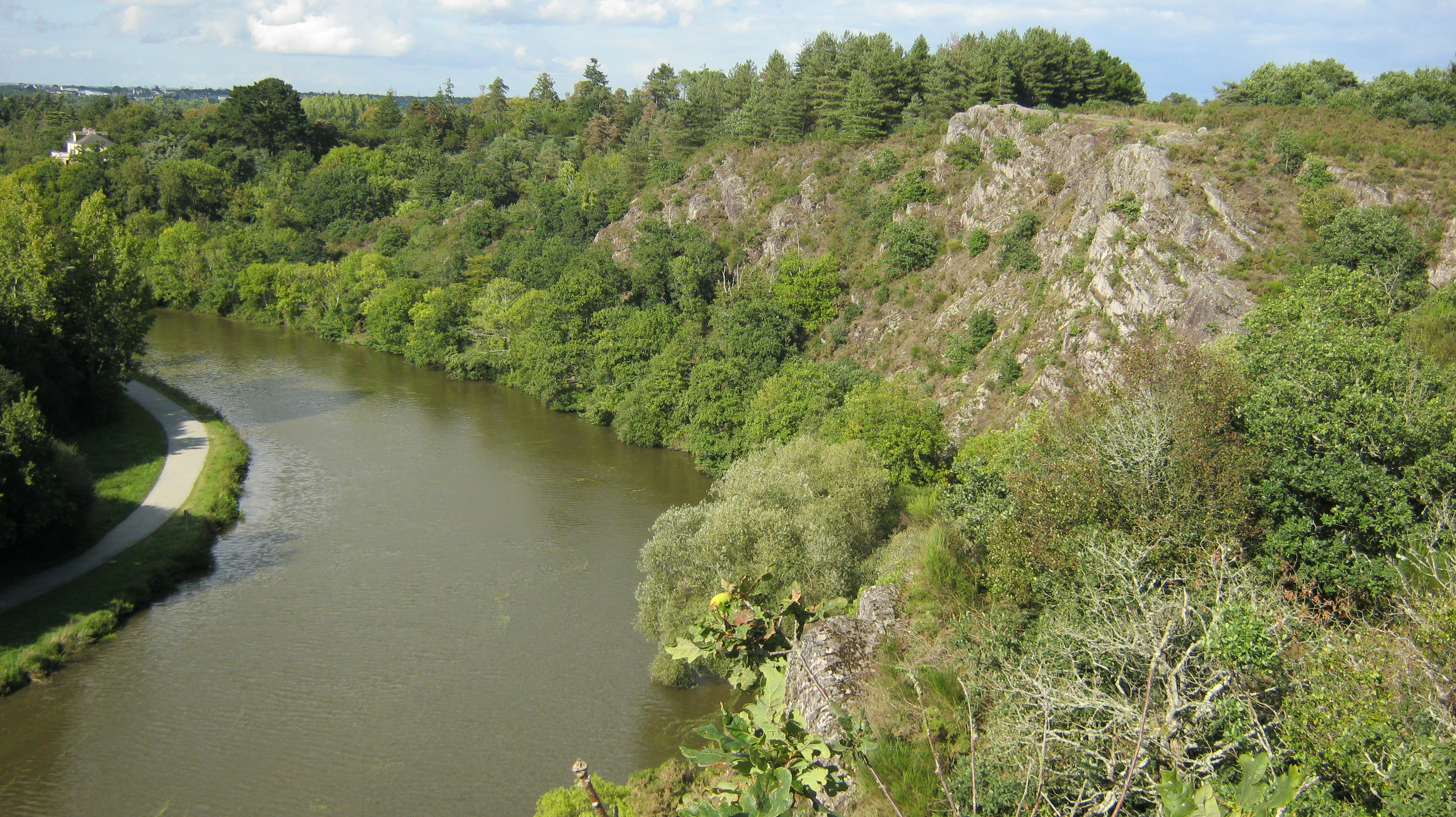
The Vilaine in Bruz

The Vilaine (French pronunciation: [vilɛn]; Breton: Gwilen) is a river in Brittany, in the west of France. The river's source is in the Mayenne département (53), and it flows out into the Atlantic Ocean at Pénestin in the Morbihan département (56). It is 218 km long.

== Course of the river ==
The river arises near the towns of Juvigné and La Croixille. It passes through 4 départements (Mayenne, Ille-et-Vilaine, Loire-Atlantique and Morbihan) and 4 main towns (Rennes, Vitré, Redon, and La Roche-Bernard), then flows into the Bay of Biscay by Pénestin.

Three barrages were built around Vitré, Ille-et-Vilaine to alleviate flooding, while securing potable water supplies:

- 1978 Valière barrage
- 1982 Haute-Vilaine barrage
- 1995 Villaumur barrage

They are also amenities for recreational activities.

== Hydrology ==
The river has a flow ranging between 2 and 1500 m^{3}/s

== Navigation ==
The Vilaine is part of Brittany's canal system, built mainly in the 19th century for relatively small barges (130 tonnes). The management of the entire system was transferred to the Brittany Region in 2011. In Rennes the river connects to the Canal d'Ille et Rance hence to the Rance estuary, which enters the English Channel at Saint-Malo. In Redon it crosses the Canal de Nantes à Brest, giving access to Pontivy and the Blavet river (west) and Nantes (east).

== Main tributaries ==
Vilaine catchment area

- Ille
- Meu
- Seiche
- Semnon
- Chère
- Don
- Oust
- Isac

== See also ==
- Pen Lan Point
