= Assérac =

Assérac Aserac (Gallo) Azereg (Breton)
- Commune
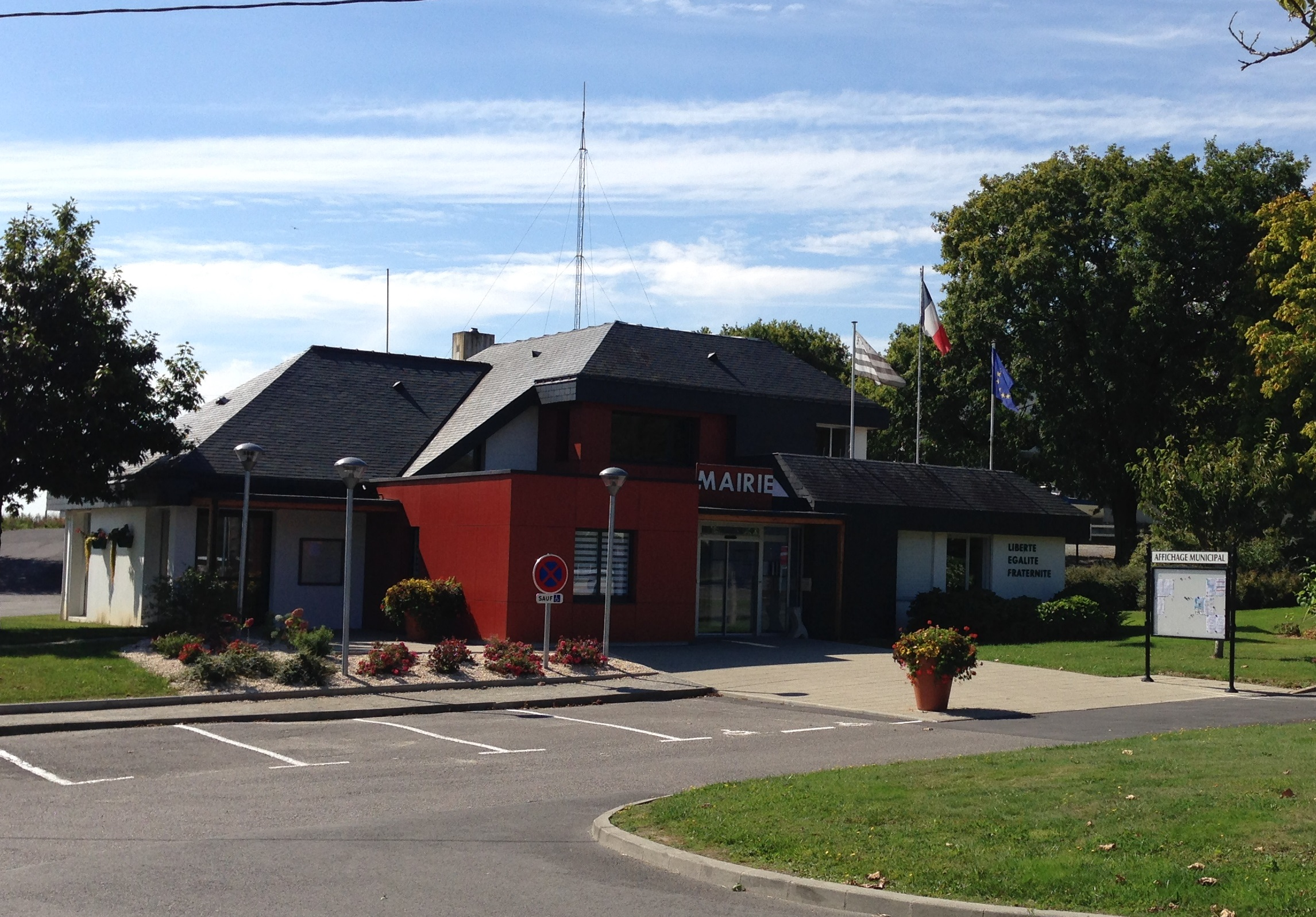
- Town hall

- Coat of arms
- Location of Assérac
- Location within France Location within Pays de la Loire
- Coordinates: 47°25′48″N 2°23′21″W
- Country: France
- Region: Pays de la Loire
- Department: Loire-Atlantique
- Arrondissement: Saint-Nazaire
- Canton: Guérande
- Intercommunality: CA Presqu'île de Guérande Atlantique

Government
  - Mayor (2020–2026): Joseph David
- Area^{1}: 32.91 km^{2} (12.71 sq mi)
- Highest elevation: 49 m (161 ft)
- Lowest elevation: 0 m (0 ft)
- Population (2023): 1,890
  - Density: 57.4/km^{2} (149/sq mi)
- Time zone: UTC+01:00 (CET)
  - Summer (DST): UTC+02:00 (CEST)
- INSEE/Postal code: 44006 /44410
- ^{1} French Land Register data, which excludes lakes, ponds, glaciers > 1 km^{2} (0.386 sq mi or 247 acres) and river estuaries.

Assérac (French pronunciation: [aseʁak]; Gallo: Aserac, Breton: Azereg) is a commune in the Loire-Atlantique department in western France.

== Population ==
Historical population
Year	Pop.	±% p.a.
1968	1,151	—
1975	1,079	−0.92%
1982	1,128	+0.64%
1990	1,239	+1.18%
1999	1,360	+1.04%
2007	1,742	+3.14%
2012	1,795	+0.60%
2017	1,790	−0.06%
2023	1,890	+0.91%
Source: INSEE

== See also ==
- La Baule - Guérande Peninsula
- Communes of the Loire-Atlantique department
- Parc naturel régional de Brière
