= Le Croisic =

Le Croisic: Le Croèzic (Gallo); Ar Groazig (Breton)
- Commune
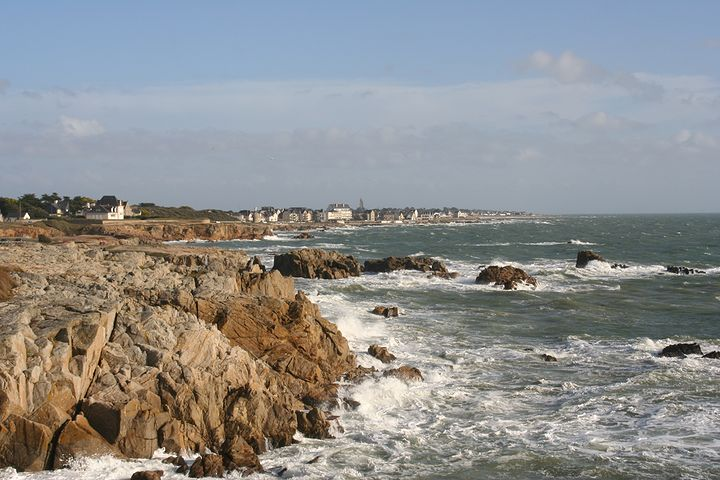

- Coat of arms
- Location of Le Croisic
- Location within France Location within Pays de la Loire
- Coordinates: 47°17′38″N 2°30′33″W
- Country: France
- Region: Pays de la Loire
- Department: Loire-Atlantique
- Arrondissement: Saint-Nazaire
- Canton: La Baule-Escoublac
- Intercommunality: CA Presqu'île de Guérande Atlantique

Government
  - Mayor (2020–2026): Michèle Quellard
- Area^{1}: 4.5 km^{2} (1.7 sq mi)
- Elevation: 5 m (16 ft)
- Highest elevation: 20 m (66 ft)
- Lowest elevation: 0 m (0 ft)
- Population (2023): 4,056
  - Density: 900/km^{2} (2,300/sq mi)
- Time zone: UTC+01:00 (CET)
  - Summer (DST): UTC+02:00 (CEST)
- INSEE/Postal code: 44049 /44490
- ^{1} French Land Register data, which excludes lakes, ponds, glaciers > 1 km^{2} (0.386 sq mi or 247 acres) and river estuaries.

Le Croisic (French pronunciation: [lə kʁwazik]; Breton: Ar Groazig; Gallo: Le Croèzic) is a commune in the Loire-Atlantique department, western France. It is part of the urban area of Saint-Nazaire.

== History ==
In the autumn of 1583, while the Catholic Church in Ireland was illegal and underground, Archbishop Dermot O'Hurley arranged for a sea captain to smuggle him into Ireland from Le Croisic and drop him upon Holmpatrick Strand in Skerries, County Dublin. Archbishop O'Hurley, who later became one of the most celebrated of the 24 Irish Catholic Martyrs, was met at Skerries by a priest named Fr. John Dillon, who accompanied him to Drogheda.

The writer and historian Auguste Lorieux (1796–1842) was born in Le Croisic. The French engineer, physicist, Nobel laureate, and the first person to discover evidence of radioactivity, Henri Becquerel died there in 1908.

The United States Navy established a naval air station on 27 November 1917 to operate seaplanes during World War I. The base was closed down shortly after the First Armistice at Compiègne.

During World War II, Le Croisic was home to a radar station for the Wehrmacht following the Fall of France and construction of the U-boat pens at Saint-Nazaire, in order to protect the Loire estuary from Allied attacks due to the Normandie dry dock at Saint-Nazaire that could be used to repair the large Kriegsmarine battleships such as the Bismarck and its sister ship, Tirpitz. However, in the March 1942 St Nazaire Raid, a British Commando team on the obsolete HMS Campbeltown and several motor launch boats were able to slip by the Le Croisic radar station and ram Campbeltown into the Normandie dry dock gate, before sabotaging other vital parts to the dry dock. Delayed action explosives on Campbeltown went off several hours after the night raid, destroying the dry dock gate and putting it out of commission until long after France was liberated and Nazi Germany had surrendered to the Allied Powers.

== Legend ==
In a medieval French legend recounted during the funeral of Anne of Brittany in 1514, Le Croisic was the scene of a story which explained the origin of the use of ermine in heraldry. In the story, Anne's supposed ancestor Innogen, the daughter of Greek king Pandrasus and wife of Brutus of Troy from Geoffrey of Monmouth's pseudo-history Historia Regum Britanniae (c. 1136), was attending a hunt at Le Croisic, when a stoat being pursued by Brutus' dogs took refuge with her. Innogen saved and fed it, and adopted it for ordre et armes ('order and arms').

== Population ==
Historical population

Year	Pop.	±% p.a.
1793	2,161	—
1821	2,308	+0.24%
1846	2,402	+0.16%
1872	3,344	+1.28%
1901	2,427	−1.10%
1926	2,368	−0.10%
1946	3,426	+1.86%
1962	4,017	+1.00%
1968	4,102	+0.35%

Year	Pop.	±% p.a.
1975	4,243	+0.48%
1982	4,313	+0.23%
1990	4,428	+0.33%
1999	4,278	−0.38%
2007	4,097	−0.54%
2012	4,040	−0.28%
2017	4,093	+0.26%
2023	4,056	−0.15%

Source: EHESS and INSEE (1968–2023)

== See also ==
- La Baule - Guérande Peninsula
- Communes of the Loire-Atlantique department
- Ferdinand du Puigaudeau
