= Brière =

Marsh in Loire-Atlantique, France

Coordinates: 47°23′N 2°12′W

Brière (French pronunciation: [bʁijɛʁ]; Breton: Ar Briwer) is the marsh area north of the Loire estuary in France, near its mouth on the Atlantic Ocean. The residents of Brière are called Briérons. The Brière marsh area includes a vast area of humid zones stretching from the Gulf of Morbihan and the estuary of the Vilaine to the north, to the salt marshes of Guérande to the west, to the estuary of the Loire and the Lac de Grand-Lieu in the south. Peat used to be harvested here.

Park emblem of Brière Regional Natural Park

The Brière territory extends over 490 km^{2} (190 sq mi), including 170 km^{2} (66 sq mi) of humid zone, at the heart of which lies the Grande Brière Mottière which encompasses 70 km^{2} (27 sq mi) and 21 communes.

It is rich in flora and fauna, and navigation is possible with boats called chalands.

Cottages are a common sight in the area, with around 3000 thatched roof cottages dotted throughout the area.

Alphonse de Chateaubriant's prize-winning novel La Brière (translated as Passion and Peat), 1923, is set in the area and describes its traditions and culture.

It has been suggested that the small islands of the Brière, now joined by silt, could have been the location of the Cassiterides - islands mentioned in antiquity as the Phoenician source of tin.

== Communes of Brière ==
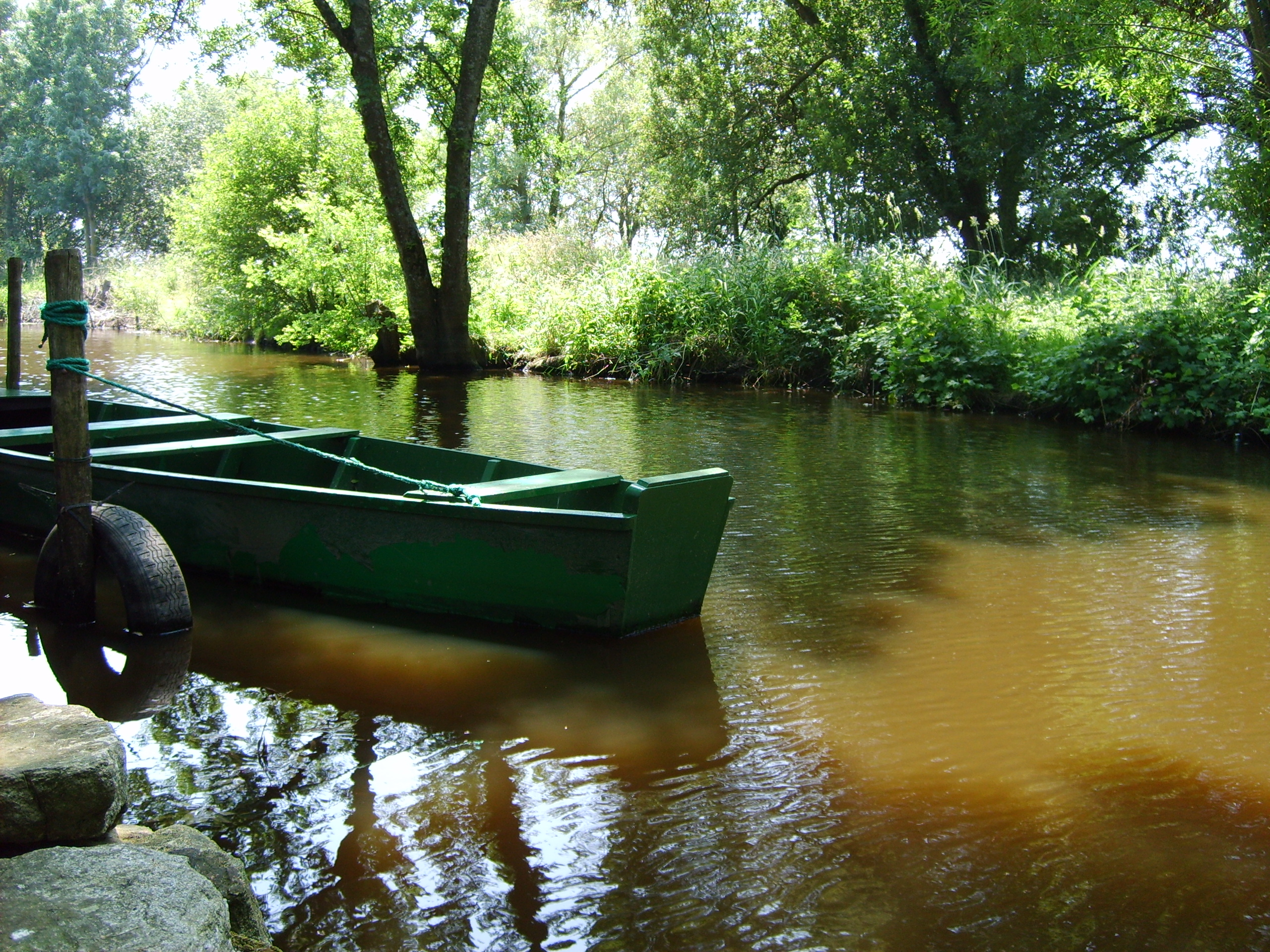
Brière

The following communes are found in Brière

- La Chapelle-des-Marais
- Crossac
- Montoir-de-Bretagne
- Saint-André-des-Eaux, Loire-Atlantique
- Saint-Joachim (the commune covering most of la Grande Brière)
- Saint-Lyphard
- Saint-Malo-de-Guersac
- Saint-Nazaire
- Sainte-Reine-de-Bretagne
- Trignac

Traditionally, 21 communes are considered part of Brière (source : , pdf file) :

- La Baule-Escoublac
- Besné
- La Chapelle-des-Marais
- La Chapelle-Launay
- Crossac
- Donges
- Guérande
- Herbignac
- Missillac
- Montoir-de-Bretagne
- Prinquiau
- Pontchâteau
- Pornichet
- Saint-André-des-Eaux
- Saint-Joachim
- Saint-Lyphard
- Saint-Malo-de-Guersac
- Saint-Nazaire
- Sainte-Reine-de-Bretagne
- Trignac
- La Turballe

The Brière Regional Natural Park encompasses 17 communes (source: , pdf file)

- Assérac
- La Baule-Escoublac
- La Chapelle-des-Marais
- Crossac
- Donges
- Guérande
- Herbignac
- Missillac
- Montoir-de-Bretagne
- Saint-André-des-Eaux
- Saint-Joachim
- Saint-Lyphard
- Saint-Malo-de-Guersac
- Saint-Molf
- Saint-Nazaire
- Sainte-Reine-de-Bretagne
- Trignac

== See also ==
- La Baule - Guérande Peninsula
