= Missillac =

Missillac Misilhac (Gallo) Merzhelieg (Breton)
- Commune
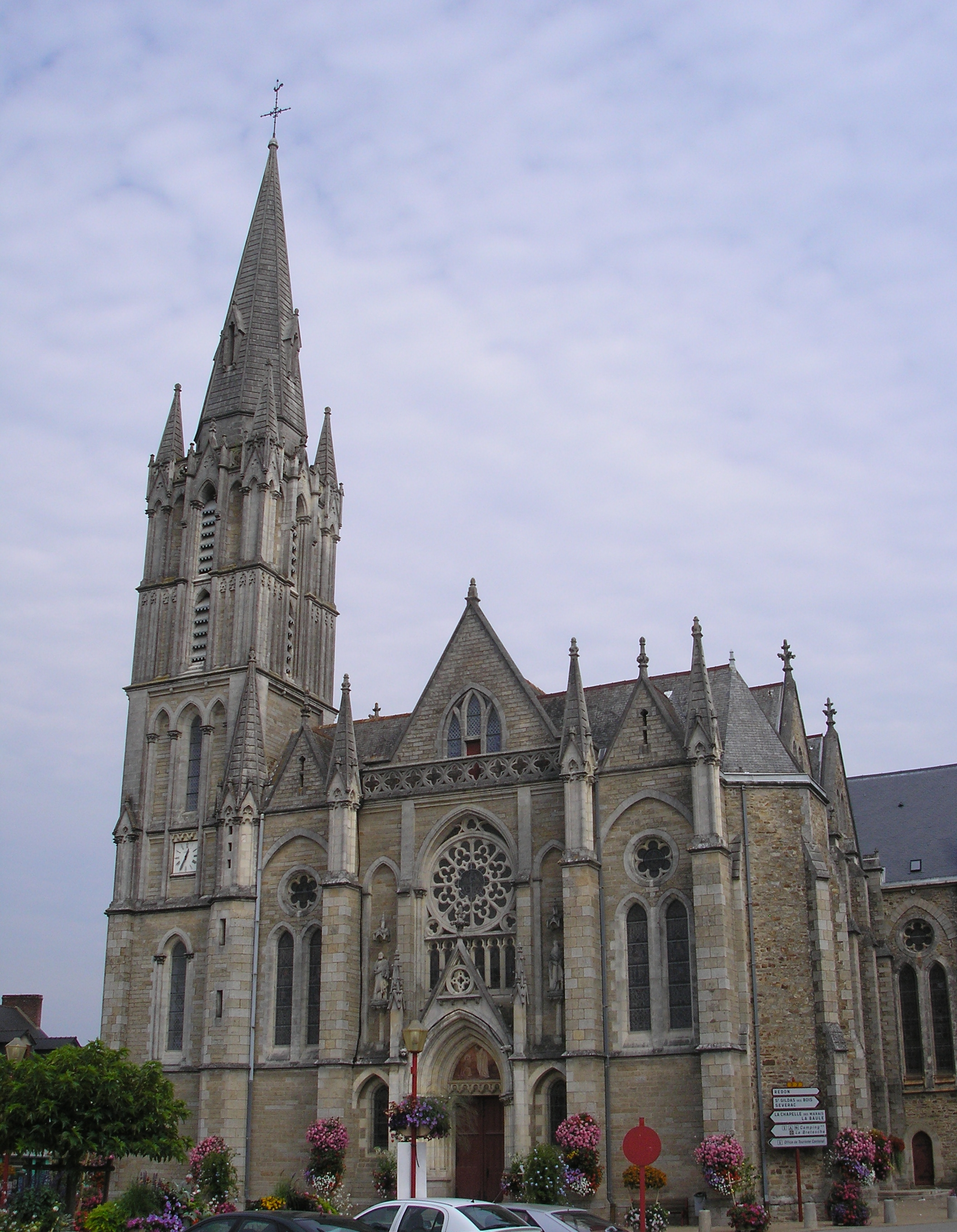
- Location of Missillac
- Location within France Location within Pays de la Loire
- Coordinates: 47°28′59″N 2°09′28″W
- Country: France
- Region: Pays de la Loire
- Department: Loire-Atlantique
- Arrondissement: Saint-Nazaire
- Canton: Pontchâteau
- Intercommunality: Pays de Pont-Château - Saint-Gildas-des-Bois

Government
  - Mayor (2020–2026): Jean-Louis Mogan
- Area^{1}: 59.55 km^{2} (22.99 sq mi)
- Highest elevation: 63 m (207 ft)
- Lowest elevation: 0 m (0 ft)
- Population (2023): 5,709
  - Density: 95.87/km^{2} (248.3/sq mi)
- Time zone: UTC+01:00 (CET)
  - Summer (DST): UTC+02:00 (CEST)
- INSEE/Postal code: 44098 /44780
- ^{1} French Land Register data, which excludes lakes, ponds, glaciers > 1 km^{2} (0.386 sq mi or 247 acres) and river estuaries.

Missillac (French pronunciation: [misijak]; Gallo: Misilhac, Breton: Merzhelieg) is a commune located in the department of Loire-Atlantique in western France.

== Geography ==
Missillac is located at the northwestern edge of Loire-Atlantique at the limit of the Morbihan 25 km from Saint-Nazaire, 65 km northwest of Nantes, and 25 km south of Redon. The communes bordering Missillac are Sévérac, Saint-Gildas-des-Bois, Sainte-Reine-de-Bretagne, La Chapelle-des-Marais, Herbignac, and Pontchâteau.

== Population ==
Historical population

Year	Pop.	±% p.a.
1793	2,200	—
1800	2,042	−1.06%
1806	2,066	+0.19%
1821	2,457	+1.16%
1831	2,615	+0.63%
1841	2,687	+0.27%
1846	2,850	+1.18%
1851	2,877	+0.19%
1856	2,977	+0.69%
1861	3,239	+1.70%
1866	3,453	+1.29%
1872	3,565	+0.53%
1876	3,616	+0.36%
1881	3,837	+1.19%
1886	3,877	+0.21%
1891	3,876	−0.01%
1896	3,840	−0.19%
1901	3,985	+0.74%

Year	Pop.	±% p.a.
1906	4,053	+0.34%
1911	3,965	−0.44%
1921	3,496	−1.25%
1926	3,416	−0.46%
1931	3,291	−0.74%
1936	3,170	−0.75%
1946	3,212	+0.13%
1954	3,295	+0.32%
1962	3,585	+1.06%
1968	3,652	+0.31%
1975	3,687	+0.14%
1982	3,883	+0.74%
1990	3,915	+0.10%
1999	3,813	−0.29%
2007	4,557	+2.25%
2012	5,016	+1.94%
2017	5,342	+1.27%
2023	5,709	+1.11%

Source: EHESS and INSEE (1968-2023)

== Transport ==
The commune is crossed by the Nantes-Vannes expressway.

== See also ==
- La Baule - Guérande Peninsula
- Communes of the Loire-Atlantique department
- Parc naturel régional de Brière
