= 2018–19 Coupe de France preliminary rounds, Pays de la Loire =

The 2018–19 Coupe de France preliminary rounds, Pays de la Loire was the qualifying competition to decide which teams from the leagues of the Pays de la Loire region of France took part in the main competition from the seventh round.

== Second round ==
These matches were played on 2 September 2018.

Second round results: Pays de la Loire
Tie no	Home team (tier)	Score	Away team (tier)
1.	US Savigné-l'Évêque (10)	1–2 (a.e.t.)	Lombron Sports (11)
2.	ES Montilliers (9)	1–0	Vigilante St Fulgent (9)
3.	US Bernardière-Cugand (9)	0–1	St Pierre Mazières (9)
4.	ASPTT Le Mans (10)	0–1	US St Mars-la-Brière (8)
5.	US Maze (10)	2–3	JS Solesmienne (8)
6.	CS Montoirin (8)	1–2 (a.e.t.)	ES Maritime (9)
7.	Commequiers SF (11)	1–3	FC Jard-Avrillé (10)
8.	ES Yvré-l'Évêque (9)	3–1	CA Voutréen (10)
9.	Pornic Foot (8)	3–1	Écureils des Pays de Monts (9)
10.	US Réunion Laval (10)	3–6	Hermine St Ouennaise (8)
11.	LS Ste Flaive des Loups (10)	0–1 (a.e.t.)	St Michel SF (11)
12.	AS Chazé-Vern (10)	2–1	US St Pierre-la-Cour (9)
13.	AS Bruffière Defontaine (10)	0–5	EA La Tessoualle (8)
14.	Montreuil-Juigné Béné Football (9)	4–2 (a.e.t.)	Louverné Sports (7)
15.	La Malouine Football (8)	4–1	Savenay-Malville FC (9)
16.	US Autize Vendée (10)	1–3	FC Plaine et Bocage (9)
17.	AOS Pontchâteau (9)	0–2	US La Baule-Le Pouliguen (7)
18.	SA St Florent-des-Bois (10)	1–2	US Mesnard-Vendrennes (11)
19.	US Chantrigné (10)	1–1 (7–6 p)	US Pays de Juhel (9)
20.	ES Pommerieux (10)	0–6	US Dyonisienne (9)
21.	AS Le Bourgneuf-la-Forêt (9)	1–0 (a.e.t.)	FA Laval (10)
22.	Flochamont-sur-Sèvre FC (8)	1–0	SomloirYzernay CPF (9)
23.	AS Juigné-sur-Sarthe (10)	0–1	NDC Angers (7)
24.	US Villaines-Malicorne (10)	0–3	FC Pellouailles-Corze (9)
25.	AS Sud Loire (9)	1–1 (2–4 p)	US Bequots-Lucquois (8)
26.	AS Boufféré (8)	2–1	FC Bouaye (8)
27.	CS Javron-Neuilly (10)	2–3	FC St Georges-Pruillé (10)
28.	Legé FC (10)	2–1	FC Noirmoutier (11)
29.	ASPTT Laval (10)	4–2 (a.e.t.)	FC Ambrières (9)
30.	AS Ballée (10)	3–7	EG Rouillon (8)
31.	AS Neuville-sur-Sarthe (10)	0–5	US Nautique Spay (7)
32.	Landreau-Loroux OSC (9)	2–1 (a.e.t.)	Hirondelles Soullandaises (11)
33.	ASC St Médard-de-Doulon Nantes (8)	2–1	ES Vallet (9)
34.	US La Chapelle-St-Rémy (9)	0–2	AS Le Mans Villaret (7)
35.	AS Étival (10)	0–5	JA Soulgé-sur-Ouette (8)
36.	FC Fief Gesté (10)	3–0	St Martin Treize Septiers (11)
37.	Jeunes d'Erbray (9)	1–0	FC Château-Gontier (8)
38.	ES Longevillaise (10)	1–2	FC Robretières La Roche-sur-Yon (8)
39.	US Bazouges-Cré (8)	5–1	La Vigilante Mayet (9)
40.	USA Pouancé (8)	4–3 (a.e.t.)	US Argentré (9)
41.	EM Sallertaine (11)	3–4	FC Saligny (9)
42.	US Vital Frossay (10)	0–4	FC La Chapelle-des-Marais (8)
43.	SC Angevin (9)	1–0	RC Doué-la-Fontaine (8)
44.	ASC St Barthélémy-d'Anjou (11)	1–4	AS Ponts-de-Cé (9)
45.	AS Vaas (10)	0–4	AS Seiches-sur-le-Loire-Marcé (8)
46.	Olympique Chemillé-Melay (8)	5–1	US Chauché (9)
47.	Anille Braye Foot (10)	1–4 (a.e.t.)	US Arnage Pontlieue (7)
48.	ES Craon (8)	3–0	AL Châteaubriant (7)
49.	FC La Génétouze (9)	0–2	AS Vieillevigne-La Planche (7)
50.	US Beaufort-en-Vallée (8)	2–1	US Glonnières (7)
51.	ASO Montenay (9)	2–1 (a.e.t.)	US Laval (8)
52.	ES Morannes (11)	0–3	AS Meslay-du-Maine (8)
53.	US Oie (11)	3–4 (a.e.t.)	FC Val de Moine (10)
54.	ES Cherré (9)	0–3	CA Evronnais (8)
55.	US Crosmièroise (9)	0–2	US Forcé (8)
56.	SC Nord Atlantique (9)	3–1 (a.e.t.)	Nozay OS (10)
57.	FC Oudon-Couffé (10)	2–1	Pomjeannais JA (10)
58.	FC Laurentais Landemontais (9)	0–1	US Lucéene (8)
59.	Réveil St Géréon (9)	0–3	AS St Pierre-Montrevault (7)
60.	FC Beaupréau (8)	1–3 (a.e.t.)	ES Haute Goulaine (9)
61.	FC Nieul-Maillezais-Les Autises (10)	2–3 (a.e.t.)	Pays de Chantonnay Foot (8)
62.	Voltigeurs St Georges-Buttavent (10)	0–5	Ernéenne Foot (7)
63.	US Chantenay-Villedieu (9)	4–1	US Le Genest (8)
64.	ES Vigneux (8)	3–1	US Ste Reine-de-Bretagne (9)
65.	La Saint André (8)	3–1	Sympho Foot Treillières (9)
66.	ES Belleville-sur-Vie (10)	2–3	ES Côte de Lumière (8)
67.	US Suplice André Mormaison (12)	1–3	ASPTT-CAEB Cholet (8)
68.	FC Talmondais (10)	1–4	La Chaize FEC (8)
69.	AS Brée (10)	2–4	ASL L'Huisserie Foot (8)
70.	St Pierre Sportif Nieul-le-Dolent (10)	0–1	US Aubigny (8)
71.	Alerte Ahuillé FC (9)	0–0 (4–5 p)	CA Loué (8)
72.	US Loire et Divatte (8)	1–2	FC Montaigu 85 (7)
73.	SS Noyen-sur-Sarthe (9)	1–1 (4–3 p)	Angers Vaillante Foot (7)
74.	Intrépide Angers Foot (8)	0–2	US Méral-Cossé (7)
75.	ASI Mûrs-Erigné (7)	6–0	US Mansigné (8)
76.	ARC Tillières (11)	0–1	FC Mouchamps-Rochetrejoux (8)
77.	St Pierre de Retz (8)	1–2 (a.e.t.)	St Aubin-Guérande Football (7)
78.	Beaulieu SF (11)	0–7	Etoile de Clisson (7)
79.	UF Allonnes-Brain-sur-Allonnes (11)	1–2	CS Changé (8)
80.	ES La Romagne-Roussay (11)	0–2	Entente Cheffois-Antigny-St Maurice (8)
81.	US Vibraysienne (9)	0–2	JS Allonnes (8)
82.	AS La Baconnière (10)	1–10	US Aronnaise (8)
83.	ES Pineaux (10)	0–5	Mouilleron SF (7)
84.	AS Moutiers-St Avaugourd (11)	1–5	Luçon FC (8)
85.	Bé-Léger FC (10)	0–4	FC Essartais (7)
86.	US Combrée-Bel-Air-Noyant (10)	2–1	US Entrammes (8)
87.	Le Cellier Mauves FC (10)	0–2	Croix Blanche Angers (8)
88.	AS Avrillé (9)	1–5	USJA Carquefou (7)
89.	FC Retz (8)	2–2 (3–5 p)	ES Marsouins Brétignolles-Brem (8)
90.	Energie Le May-sur-Èvre (8)	1–1 (5–4 p)	LSG Les Brouzils (8)
91.	Nuillé Sport (9)	3–5	ES Moncé (7)
92.	US Cigné (8)	2–3 (a.e.t.)	CS Sablons-Gazonfier (9)
93.	US Bouloire (9)	1–2	US St Berthevin (7)
94.	AS Loigné-sur-Mayenne (10)	0–4	US Guécélard (8)
95.	AC Longué (10)	4–2	AG Laigné (8)
96.	ES Vertou (10)	1–2	AC Chapelain Foot (7)
97.	AL Couëts Bouguenais (11)	0–2	FC Grand Lieu (9)
98.	Océane FC (10)	0–3	Nantes La Mellinet (8)
99.	FC Trois Rivières (10)	4–1	Les Touches FC (11)
100.	US Bournezeau-St Hilaire (10)	3–2	FC Portugais Cholet (8)
101.	Gorron FC (8)	2–2 (1–4 p)	SO Maine (7)
102.	Hirondelle Football (8)	1–3	Vendée Poiré-sur-Vie Football (7)
103.	Élan de Gorges Foot (8)	1–3	La France d'Aizenay (7)
104.	Abbaretz-Saffré FC (10)	3–2	JA St Mars-du-Désert (8)
105.	EA Baugeois (10)	3–4	La Patriote Bonnétable (8)
106.	ES Bouchemaine (8)	4–1	CO St Saturnin Arche (7)
107.	AS Écouflant (11)	1–0 (a.e.t.)	AS St Sylvain-d'Anjou (10)
108.	EV Le Fenouiller (10)	0–1	Stade Olonnais (7)
109.	Christophe-Séguinière (8)	1–2 (a.e.t.)	Mareuil SC (7)
110.	Héric FC (10)	2–1	AS Guillaumois (11)
111.	US St Georges-sur-Loire (11)	2–7	ASD Noyantais (11)
112.	FC Chaudron-St Quentin (10)	0–5	AS Bayard-Saumur (8)
113.	FC St Lambert-St Jean-St Léger-St Martin (10)	0–3	ES Andard-Brain (8)
114.	AS Tiercé-Cheffes (8)	2–4	FE Trélazé (7)
115.	ES Aubance (8)	2–3	RC Ancenis 44 (7)
116.	AEPR Rezé (8)	2–4 (a.e.t.)	AC Basse-Goulaine (7)
117.	FC Mouzeil-Teillé-Ligné (8)	0–1 (a.e.t.)	Elan Sorinières Football (7)
118.	St Melaine OS (11)	2–3	ASVR Ambillou-Château (11)
119.	AF Apremont-La Chapelle (11)	1–0	FC Achards (8)
120.	AS St Hilaire-Vihiers-St Paul (8)	0–1	FC Cécilien Martinoyen (8)
121.	ÉS Trélazé (8)	3–2	St Sébastien FC (7)
122.	UFC Erdre et Donneau (11)	0–0 (2–4 p)	AS Marsacais (10)
123.	AS Mésanger (11)	2–0	AS Valanjou (11)
124.	Nantes St Pierre (8)	0–1	US Philbertine Football (7)
125.	FC Logne et Boulogne (10)	1–2	FC Immaculée (8)
126.	ES Blain (8)	2–0	Orvault SF (7)
127.	Stade Couëronnais FC (10)	1–8	UF St Herblain (7)
128.	FC Stephanois (11)	0–2	Nantes Pin Sec FC (10)
129.	FC Bourgneuf-en-Retz (10)	1–1 (3–5 p)	St Marc Football (9)
130.	St Sebastien Boussay (11)	1–1 (5–3 p)	Espérance St Yves Nantes (11)
131.	FC Toutes Aides Nantes (11)	4–0	Eclair de Chauvé (11)
132.	Herbadilla Foot (11)	0–1	Nantes Sud 98 (11)

== Third round ==
These matches were played on 15 and 16 September 2018, with one tie replayed on 23 September 2018.

Third round results: Pays de la Loire
Tie no	Home team (tier)	Score	Away team (tier)
1.	Stade Olonnais (7)	4–1 (a.e.t.)	Sablé FC (5)
2.	SC Nord Atlantique (9)	0–3	Vendée Fontenay Foot (5)
3.	Legé FC (10)	2–3	FC Essartais (7)
4.	FC Robretières La Roche-sur-Yon (8)	3–1 (a.e.t.)	FE Trélazé (7)
5.	AC Longué (10)	1–5	ES Bonchamp (6)
6.	CA Loué (8)	4–0	ASL L'Huisserie Foot (8)
7.	FC Jard-Avrillé (10)	0–3	La Roche VF (5)
8.	ES Yvré-l'Évêque (9)	0–6	AS Mulsanne-Teloché (6)
9.	AS Écouflant (11)	0–2	Croix Blanche Angers (8)
10.	Pays de Chantonnay Foot (8)	0–3	ASC St Médard-de-Doulon Nantes (8)
11.	FC Saligny (9)	2–4	St Aubin-Guérande Football (7)
12.	La Malouine Football (8)	5–3	Jeunes d'Erbray (9)
13.	SS Noyen-sur-Sarthe (9)	1–3	JSC Bellevue Nantes (6)
14.	FC La Chapelle-des-Marais (8)	1–1 (3–0 p)	ESOF La Roche-sur-Yon (6)
15.	ES Côte de Lumière (8)	0–5	Voltigeurs de Châteaubriant (5)
16.	US Beaufort-en-Vallée (8)	2–2 (1–3 p)	ES Craon (8)
17.	JS Solesmienne (8)	3–2	Ernéenne Foot (7)
18.	Entente Cheffois-Antigny-St Maurice (8)	2–1	ES Haute Goulaine (9)
19.	Nantes Pin Sec FC (10)	1–5	Pornic Foot (8)
20.	JS Allonnes (8)	1–2	SO Maine (7)
21.	Hermine St Ouennaise (8)	1–1 (3–5 p) (Note: Match was replayed after a refereeing error regarding the return to the field of players substituted. The scoreline of the original match was 2–1 (a.e.t.).)	FC Pellouailles-Corze (9)
22.	US Mesnard-Vendrennes (11)	0–5	TVEC Les Sables-d'Olonne (6)
23.	Patriote Brulonnaise (6)	4–0	US Arnage Pontlieue (7)
24.	FC Plaine et Bocage (9)	0–1	US Bequots-Lucquois (8)
25.	St Pierre Mazières (9)	1–0	FC Montaigu 85 (7)
26.	AF Apremont-La Chapelle (11)	0–6	AS Vieillevigne-La Planche (7)
27.	EG Rouillon (8)	2–0	CS Sablons-Gazonfier (9)
28.	Nantes La Mellinet (8)	2–4	FC Rezé (6)
29.	SA Mamertins (6)	0–0 (10–11 p)	CA Evronnais (8)
30.	USJA Carquefou (7)	1–0	ES Bouchemaine (8)
31.	US Chantrigné (10)	0–2	US Nautique Spay (7)
32.	US Combrée-Bel-Air-Noyant (10)	0–1	US Lucéene (8)
33.	US Aronnaise (8)	1–4	US Changé (6)
34.	FC Grand Lieu (9)	2–1	Energie Le May-sur-Èvre (8)
35.	UF St Herblain (7)	4–0	Flochamont-sur-Sèvre FC (8)
36.	ASD Noyantais (11)	0–2	FC Mouchamps-Rochetrejoux (8)
37.	AS Mésanger (11)	0–0 (2–3 p)	US Guécélard (8)
38.	Mareuil SC (7)	0–4	Saint-Nazaire AF (5)
39.	Landreau-Loroux OSC (9)	1–2	ÉS Trélazé (8)
40.	FC Cécilien Martinoyen (8)	1–2 (a.e.t.)	RC Ancenis 44 (7)
41.	US Aubigny (8)	0–0 (4–2 p)	SC Beaucouzé (6)
42.	US Bournezeau-St Hilaire (10)	0–2	La France d'Aizenay (7)
43.	ASPTT-CAEB Cholet (8)	0–5	La Suze FC (5)
44.	US Forcé (8)	0–6	La Flèche RC (5)
45.	FC Oudon-Couffé (10)	2–1	AS Seiches-sur-le-Loire-Marcé (8)
46.	La Chaize FEC (8)	0–1	Mouilleron SF (7)
47.	La Saint André (8)	0–2	AS Bourny Laval (6)
48.	JA Soulgé-sur-Ouette (8)	2–0	Montreuil-Juigné Béné Football (9)
49.	St Marc Football (9)	0–5	FC Challans (5)
50.	AS Le Mans Villaret (7)	2–1 (a.e.t.)	USA Pouancé (8)
51.	US Dyonisienne (9)	1–4	US St Berthevin (7)
52.	AC Chapelain Foot (7)	0–2	ES Blain (8)
53.	FC Trois Rivières (10)	0–4	AS Sautronnaise (6)
54.	ASPTT Laval (10)	2–2 (6–7 p)	US St Mars-la-Brière (8)
55.	ES Montilliers (9)	0–5	AS La Châtaigneraie (6)
56.	AS Marsacais (10)	1–0	FC Toutes Aides Nantes (11)
57.	Luçon FC (8)	0–2	AS St Pierre-Montrevault (7)
58.	CS Changé (8)	2–1	ES Andard-Brain (8)
59.	Elan Sorinières Football (7)	0–2	Olympique Saumur FC (5)
60.	ASVR Ambillou-Château (11)	0–2	Olympique Chemillé-Melay (8)
61.	EA La Tessoualle (8)	1–3	US Méral-Cossé (7)
62.	La Patriote Bonnétable (8)	0–5	ES Segré (6)
63.	US Chantenay-Villedieu (9)	1–2	SC Angevin (9)
64.	AS Ponts-de-Cé (9)	3–1	Abbaretz-Saffré FC (10)
65.	AS Chazé-Vern (10)	0–1	Etoile de Clisson (7)
66.	St Michel SF (11)	2–4	ASI Mûrs-Erigné (7)
67.	Nantes Sud 98 (11)	0–5	AC Basse-Goulaine (7)
68.	AS Meslay-du-Maine (8)	1–3	Ancienne Château-Gontier (6)
69.	ASO Montenay (9)	0–5	Écommoy FC (6)
70.	AS Le Bourgneuf-la-Forêt (9)	3–2	JS Coulaines (6)
71.	US Bazouges-Cré (8)	1–5	Stade Mayennais FC (6)
72.	NDC Angers (7)	0–0 (5–4 p)	Pouzauges Bocage FC (6)
73.	St Sebastien Boussay (11)	1–4	Héric FC (10)
74.	FC Val de Moine (10)	1–4	ES Marsouins Brétignolles-Brem (8)
75.	Lombron Sports (11)	1–3	ES Moncé (7)
76.	ES Vigneux (8)	0–0 (5–3 p)	AS Boufféré (8)
77.	FC St Georges-Pruillé (10)	0–2	AS Bayard-Saumur (8)
78.	US Philbertine Football (7)	1–3 (a.e.t.)	Vendée Poiré-sur-Vie Football (7)
79.	FC Immaculée (8)	2–2 (3–0 p)	US La Baule-Le Pouliguen (7)
80.	ES Maritime (9)	0–3	USSA Vertou (5)
81.	FC Fief Gesté (10)	1–3 (a.e.t.)	VS Fertois (6)

== Fourth round ==
These matches were played on 29 and 30 September 2018.

Fourth round results: Pays de la Loire
Tie no	Home team (tier)	Score	Away team (tier)
1.	FC Challans (5)	2–0	La Flèche RC (5)
2.	Héric FC (10)	2–1	JS Solesmienne (8)
3.	ES Marsouins Brétignolles-Brem (8)	0–2	FC Mouchamps-Rochetrejoux (8)
4.	TVEC Les Sables-d'Olonne (6)	0–2	Saint-Nazaire AF (5)
5.	FC Essartais (7)	0–1	US St Mars-la-Brière (8)
6.	Etoile de Clisson (7)	0–1	ES Craon (8)
7.	US Changé (6)	2–0	SO Maine (7)
8.	SC Angevin (9)	3–2	Croix Blanche Angers (8)
9.	FC Immaculée (8)	2–7	JSC Bellevue Nantes (6)
10.	CA Evronnais (8)	1–6	ES Segré (6)
11.	US Nautique Spay (7)	1–3	La France d'Aizenay (7)
12.	AS Le Bourgneuf-la-Forêt (9)	1–2	La Malouine Football (8)
13.	St Aubin-Guérande Football (7)	1–4	FC La Chapelle-des-Marais (8)
14.	AS Mulsanne-Teloché (6)	4–3 (a.e.t.)	NDC Angers (7)
15.	AS St Pierre-Montrevault (7)	3–4	CS Changé (8)
16.	ES Bonchamp (6)	1–2	USJA Carquefou (7)
17.	FC Rezé (6)	0–0 (4–2 p)	La Roche VF (5)
18.	US Aubigny (8)	0–1	AS Ponts-de-Cé (9)
19.	FC Pellouailles-Corze (9)	2–1	Entente Cheffois-Antigny-St Maurice (8)
20.	AC Basse-Goulaine (7)	2–3	Mouilleron SF (7)
21.	ES Vigneux (8)	1–3	AS La Châtaigneraie (6)
22.	AS Bayard-Saumur (8)	1–2 (a.e.t.)	La Suze FC (5)
23.	Vendée Poiré-sur-Vie Football (7)	4–1	ES Moncé (7)
24.	FC Oudon-Couffé (10)	0–2	ASC St Médard-de-Doulon Nantes (8)
25.	US Lucéene (8)	3–2 (a.e.t.)	UF St Herblain (7)
26.	FC Grand Lieu (9)	2–2 (4–1 p)	CA Loué (8)
27.	Ancienne Château-Gontier (6)	3–1	Patriote Brulonnaise (6)
28.	US Méral-Cossé (7)	1–4	Voltigeurs de Châteaubriant (5)
29.	US St Berthevin (7)	0–3	Vendée Fontenay Foot (5)
30.	JA Soulgé-sur-Ouette (8)	1–0	AS Sautronnaise (6)
31.	St Pierre Mazières (9)	3–2	Écommoy FC (6)
32.	US Guécélard (8)	1–3	VS Fertois (6)
33.	ASI Mûrs-Erigné (7)	2–1	Stade Olonnais (7)
34.	EG Rouillon (8)	0–2	FC Robretières La Roche-sur-Yon (8)
35.	ES Blain (8)	3–1	AS Vieillevigne-La Planche (7)
36.	AS Marsacais (10)	0–4	Olympique Chemillé-Melay (8)
37.	US Bequots-Lucquois (8)	1–4 (a.e.t.)	Stade Mayennais FC (6)
38.	Pornic Foot (8)	0–6	Les Herbiers VF (4)
39.	AS Bourny Laval (6)	2–2 (6–5 p)	AS Le Mans Villaret (7)
40.	RC Ancenis 44 (7)	0–1	USSA Vertou (5)
41.	ÉS Trélazé (8)	0–5	Olympique Saumur FC (5)

== Fifth round ==
These matches were played on 13 and 14 October 2018.

Fifth round results: Pays de la Loire
Tie no	Home team (tier)	Score	Away team (tier)
1.	FC Mouchamps-Rochetrejoux (8)	0–3	VS Fertois (6)
2.	La France d'Aizenay (7)	1–2 (a.e.t.)	ASI Mûrs-Erigné (7)
3.	La Suze FC (5)	0–2	Le Mans FC (3)
4.	FC Grand Lieu (9)	1–2	AS Bourny Laval (6)
5.	US St Mars-la-Brière (8)	0–1	JA Soulgé-sur-Ouette (8)
6.	Voltigeurs de Châteaubriant (5)	0–1	Vendée Fontenay Foot (5)
7.	St Pierre Mazières (9)	1–3	US Changé (6)
8.	US Lucéene (8)	1–2 (a.e.t.)	FC Rezé (6)
9.	FC Robretières La Roche-sur-Yon (8)	0–5	Les Herbiers VF (4)
10.	ES Segré (6)	1–2	SO Cholet (3)
11.	FC La Chapelle-des-Marais (8)	5–4	Ancienne Château-Gontier (6)
12.	Olympique Chemillé-Melay (8)	3–2 (a.e.t.)	ES Blain (8)
13.	SC Angevin (9)	0–2	JSC Bellevue Nantes (6)
14.	AS Ponts-de-Cé (9)	0–7	USSA Vertou (5)
15.	Vendée Poiré-sur-Vie Football (7)	3–1	Olympique Saumur FC (5)
16.	La Malouine Football (8)	2–1	CS Changé (8)
17.	Stade Mayennais FC (6)	0–2	AS La Châtaigneraie (6)
18.	Héric FC (10)	0–4	USJA Carquefou (7)
19.	ES Craon (8)	0–9	FC Challans (5)
20.	ASC St Médard-de-Doulon Nantes (8)	1–0	FC Pellouailles-Corze (9)
21.	AS Mulsanne-Teloché (6)	1–0	Stade Lavallois (3)
22.	Mouilleron SF (7)	0–1	Saint-Nazaire AF (5)

== Sixth round ==
These matches were played on 27 and 28 October 2018.

Sixth round results: Pays de la Loire
Tie no	Home team (tier)	Score	Away team (tier)
1.	FC La Chapelle-des-Marais (8)	3–1	Olympique Chemillé-Melay (8)
2.	AS Mulsanne-Teloché (6)	0–2 (a.e.t.)	SO Cholet (3)
3.	ASC St Médard-de-Doulon Nantes (8)	1–2	AS Bourny Laval (6)
4.	La Malouine Football (8)	1–4	Vendée Fontenay Foot (5)
5.	VS Fertois (6)	0–3 (a.e.t.)	Les Herbiers VF (4)
6.	USJA Carquefou (7)	0–2	FC Challans (5)
7.	ASI Mûrs-Erigné (7)	0–3	AS La Châtaigneraie (6)
8.	FC Rezé (6)	0–2	Vendée Poiré-sur-Vie Football (7)
9.	US Changé (6)	1–3	Le Mans FC (3)
10.	JA Soulgé-sur-Ouette (8)	1–2	JSC Bellevue Nantes (6)
11.	Saint-Nazaire AF (5)	0–1	USSA Vertou (5)
