= La Chapelle-des-Marais =

La Chapelle-des-Marais La Chapèll-dez-Marèsc (Gallo) Chapel-ar-Genioù (Breton)
- Commune
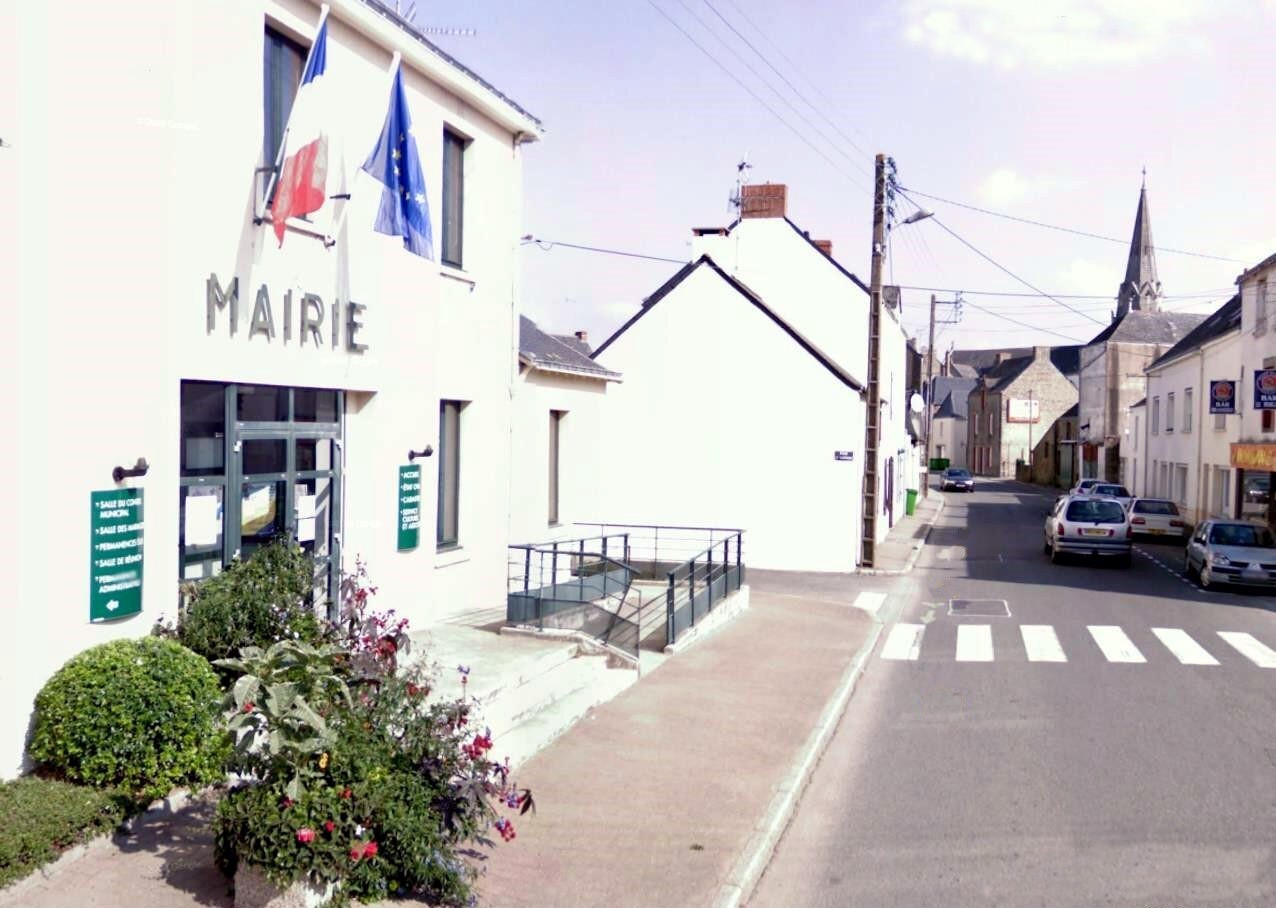
- Town hall

- Coat of arms
- Location of La Chapelle-des-Marais
- Location within France Location within Pays de la Loire
- Coordinates: 47°26′53″N 2°14′25″W
- Country: France
- Region: Pays de la Loire
- Department: Loire-Atlantique
- Arrondissement: Saint-Nazaire
- Canton: Guérande
- Intercommunality: CA Région Nazairienne et Estuaire

Government
  - Mayor (2020–2026): Franck Hervy
- Area^{1}: 18.05 km^{2} (6.97 sq mi)
- Highest elevation: 11 m (36 ft)
- Lowest elevation: 0 m (0 ft)
- Population (2023): 4,492
  - Density: 248.9/km^{2} (644.6/sq mi)
- Time zone: UTC+01:00 (CET)
  - Summer (DST): UTC+02:00 (CEST)
- INSEE/Postal code: 44030 /44410
- ^{1} French Land Register data, which excludes lakes, ponds, glaciers > 1 km^{2} (0.386 sq mi or 247 acres) and river estuaries.

La Chapelle-des-Marais (French pronunciation: [la ʃapɛl de maʁɛ]; Gallo: La Chapèll-dez-Marèsc, Breton: Chapel-ar-Geunioù) is a commune in the Loire-Atlantique department in western France.La Chapelle-des-Marais is located 25 km north of Saint-Nazaire, 42 km south of Redon, 57 km east of Vannes and 67 km west of Nantes. The neighboring municipalities of La Chapelle-des-Marais are Herbignac, Saint-Joachim, Sainte-Reine-de-Bretagne and Missillac.

== History ==
The territory of La Chapelle-des-Marais commune has two distinct parts: the "mainland" where the village developed and which is home to some "small villages" and the marsh surrounding the Mayun peninsula and the twin islands of Camer-Camerun.

In 1846, the region had 1,900 inhabitants. Two-thirds of them worked and lived in the two large villages of Mayun and Camer-Camerun. With 330 inhabitants, the Bourg only gathered 17% of the total population. It contained the church, the school, and the few services and businesses necessary for the economic and social life of a territory whose main activities were related to agriculture.

The village is twinned with the village of Ingleton in North Yorkshire.

== Population ==
Historical population

Year	Pop.	±% p.a.
1793	1,500	—
1821	1,753	+0.56%
1846	1,957	+0.44%
1872	2,092	+0.26%
1901	2,174	+0.13%
1926	2,225	+0.09%
1946	2,285	+0.13%
1962	2,476	+0.50%
1968	2,550	+0.49%

Year	Pop.	±% p.a.
1975	2,767	+1.17%
1982	3,037	+1.34%
1990	3,206	+0.68%
1999	2,955	−0.90%
2007	3,356	+1.60%
2012	3,901	+3.06%
2017	4,185	+1.42%
2023	4,492	+1.19%

Source: EHESS and INSEE (1968-2023)

== Sports ==
The city has one association football team, FC La Chapelle-des-Marais, playing in Group H of the Championnat de France amateur 2, the 5th division of the French football league system. They play in pink shirts, black shorts, and black socks. They were founded in 1989 and play at the Stade Municipal de la Perriere.

== See also ==
- Communes of the Loire-Atlantique department
- FC La Chapelle-des-Marais
- Parc naturel régional de Brière
