= Earl Stannard =

Mining engineer

- Born: 9 December 1882; Chittenango, New York, US
- Died: 9 September 1949 (aged 66); Saint-Joachim, Quebec, Canada
- Spouse: Jeannette Condon Stannard (married 1918-1949)
- Parent(s): Burdette Stannard; Valenta Emaline Stannard

Earl Tappan Stannard (9 December 1882 – 9 September 1949) was an American mining engineer and corporate executive who served as president and chief executive officer of the Kennecott Copper Corporation, one of the world's largest mining companies in the mid-20th century. After graduating from the Sheffield Scientific School at Yale University, Stannard rose through the ranks of Kennecott's Alaskan operations before taking corporate leadership of the conglomerate in New York. His influential career was cut short when he, along with two other Kennecott executives, was killed in the Canadian Pacific Air Lines Flight 108 bombing, a notorious act of mass murder committed by Albert Guay.

== Early life ==
Stannard was born in Chittenango, New York. He prepared for university at Phillips Academy in Andover, Massachusetts, graduating in 1902. Stannard then enrolled at the Sheffield Scientific School at Yale University, where he majored in mining engineering. He earned multiple honors in mathematics and general science, graduated with the class of 1905, and secured a graduate scholarship for his thesis focusing on mine ore-crushing machinery. His collegiate achievements earned him induction into the national scientific honor society Sigma Xi.

== Early career ==
After his graduate work at Yale Stannard began working as a mill superintendent for the Guggenheim-owned Federal Mining Company in Flat Rock, Missouri. Recognizing his technical acumen, in 1910 the Guggenheims transferred him to Chile to troubleshoot engineering hurdles at the newly constructed Braden Copper Company mill at the El Teniente mine.

In 1913, Stannard was sent north to Kennecott, Alaska, tasked with modernizing the local gravity mill and optimizing it's processing yield. There, Stannard made a technical breakthrough: he designed an ammonia leaching process which recovered copper from low-grade carbonate ores, raising the mine's overall recovery rate to over 95%. He later introduced flotation plants to upgrade output at Kennecott’s Beatson Mine on Latouche Island.

== Executive Leadership at Kennecott ==
Stannard's innovations transitioned him from field management to corporate leadership. He went on to serve as the president of both the Copper River and Northwestern Railroad and the Alaska Steamship Company, critical transport branches of the Alaskan mining empire.

By the late 1930s, Stannard moved to corporate headquarters in New York to succeed his long-time mentor, Stephen Birch, as the head of the conglomerate. Formally stepping into the role of President and CEO of Kennecott Copper Corporation in 1940, Stannard steered the company through the massive production demands of World War II. Under his guidance, Kennecott scaled production across all global operations, transforming the company into the world's leading copper producer. He also sat as a director on several powerful corporate boards of the era, including J.P. Morgan and Johns Manville.

== Flight 108 Incident and Death ==
In September 1949, Stannard was nearing retirement. To ensure a seamless corporate transition, he arranged an inspection tour of Kennecott's newly acquired $25 million titanium venture in Quebec, Canada. Accompanying Stannard on the trip were his designated successor, Arthur Storke (then-president of Climax Molybdenum Corp.), and Kennecott Vice President Russell J. Parker.

On September 9, 1949, the three executives boarded Canadian Pacific Air Lines Flight 108, a Douglas DC-3 flying from Montreal to Baie-Comeau. While flying over Saint-Joachim near Quebec City, a time bomb hidden in the forward baggage compartment detonated. The explosion blew the plane apart, killing all 23 people on board. A subsequent investigation revealed the incident was an act of mass murder carried out by a local jeweler named Albert Guay, who planted the bomb to murder his wife and collect her life insurance payout.

The loss of Stannard, Storke, and Parker momentarily threw Kennecott into a leadership crisis.

== Personal life ==
Stannard married Jeannette Condon in Manhattan, New York, on June 11, 1918. The couple had two daughters.

Following his death, Stannard was interred at the Ferncliff Cemetery in Hartsdale, New York. Stannard left behind a net estate evaluated at over $1.2 million. Per his final will, a substantial remainder of his estate was bequeathed to Yale University to establish the E. Tappan Stannard Research Fund, which continues to provide graduate scholarships in the sciences. Decades after his passing, Stannard was formally inducted into the American Mining Hall of Fame on December 6, 2014.
