= Drefféac =

Drefféac D·rfé (Gallo) Devrieg (Breton)
- Commune
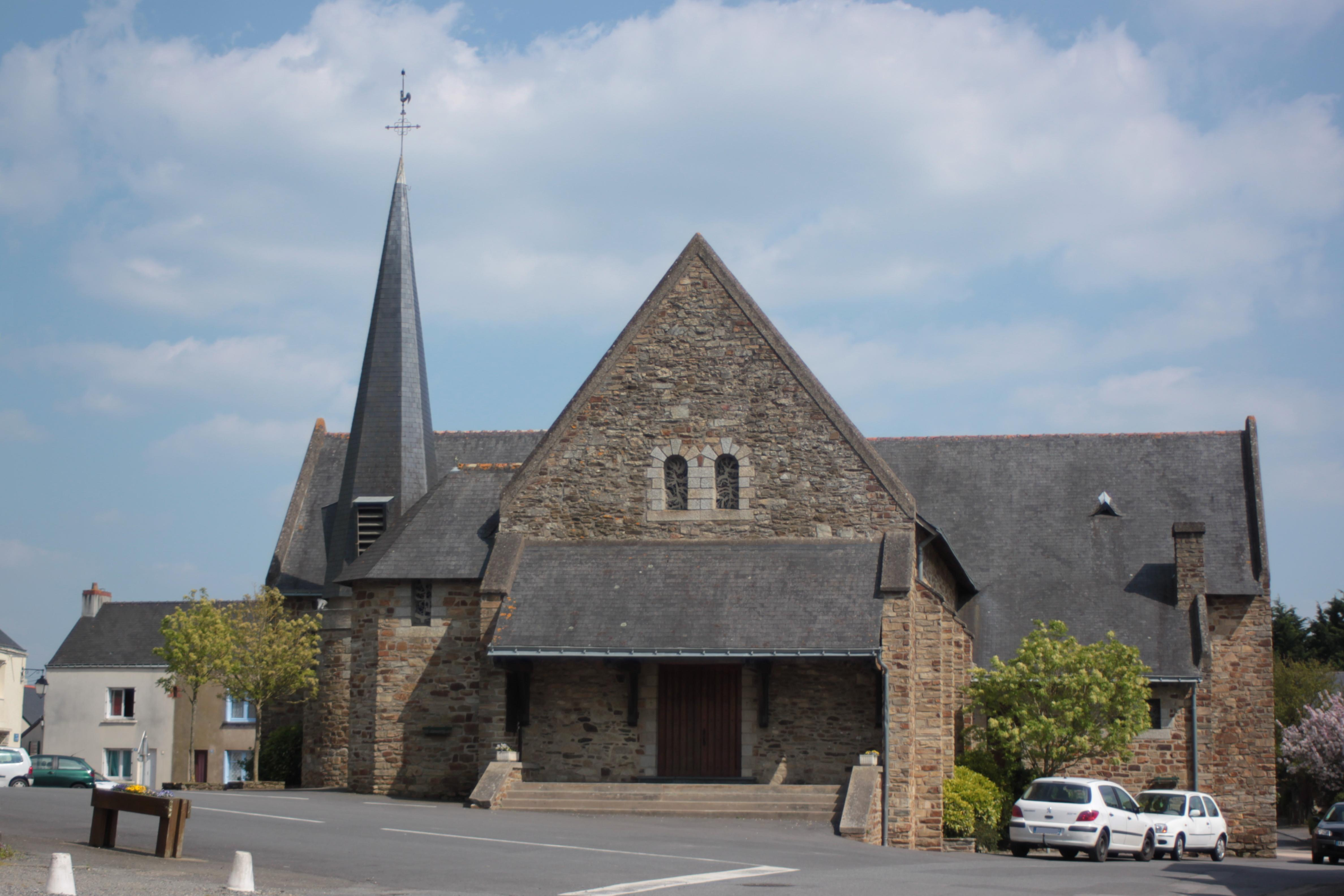

- Coat of arms
- Location of Drefféac
- Location within France Location within Pays de la Loire
- Coordinates: 47°28′38″N 2°03′18″W
- Country: France
- Region: Pays de la Loire
- Department: Loire-Atlantique
- Arrondissement: Saint-Nazaire
- Canton: Pontchâteau
- Intercommunality: Pays de Pont-Château - Saint-Gildas-des-Bois

Government
  - Mayor (2020–2026): Philippe Jouny
- Area^{1}: 14.16 km^{2} (5.47 sq mi)
- Highest elevation: 33 m (108 ft)
- Lowest elevation: 0 m (0 ft)
- Population (2023): 2,288
  - Density: 161.6/km^{2} (418.5/sq mi)
- Time zone: UTC+01:00 (CET)
  - Summer (DST): UTC+02:00 (CEST)
- INSEE/Postal code: 44053 /44530
- ^{1} French Land Register data, which excludes lakes, ponds, glaciers > 1 km^{2} (0.386 sq mi or 247 acres) and river estuaries.

Drefféac (French pronunciation: [dʁefeak]; Gallo: D·rfé, Breton: Devrieg) is a commune in the Loire-Atlantique department in western France.

== Population ==
Historical population

Year	Pop.	±% p.a.
1793	513	—
1821	520	+0.05%
1846	650	+0.90%
1872	808	+0.84%
1901	933	+0.50%
1926	820	−0.52%
1946	830	+0.06%
1962	867	+0.27%
1968	859	−0.15%

Year	Pop.	±% p.a.
1975	803	−0.96%
1982	1,145	+5.20%
1990	1,296	+1.56%
1999	1,322	+0.22%
2007	1,529	+1.83%
2012	2,031	+5.84%
2017	2,228	+1.87%
2023	2,288	+0.44%

Source: EHESS and INSEE (1968-2023)

== See also ==
- Communes of the Loire-Atlantique department
