= Canton of Pontchâteau =

Coordinates: 47.44°N 2.09°W

The canton of Pontchâteau is an administrative division of the Loire-Atlantique department, western France. Its borders were modified at the French canton reorganisation which came into effect in March 2015. Its seat is in Pontchâteau.

It consists of the following communes:

1. Avessac
2. Crossac
3. Drefféac
4. Fégréac
5. Guenrouet
6. Missillac
7. Plessé
8. Pontchâteau
9. Sainte-Anne-sur-Brivet
10. Sainte-Reine-de-Bretagne
11. Saint-Gildas-des-Bois
12. Saint-Nicolas-de-Redon
13. Sévérac
