= Guenrouet =

Guenrouet Genroèt/Ghinrouètt (Gallo) Gwenred (Breton)
- Commune
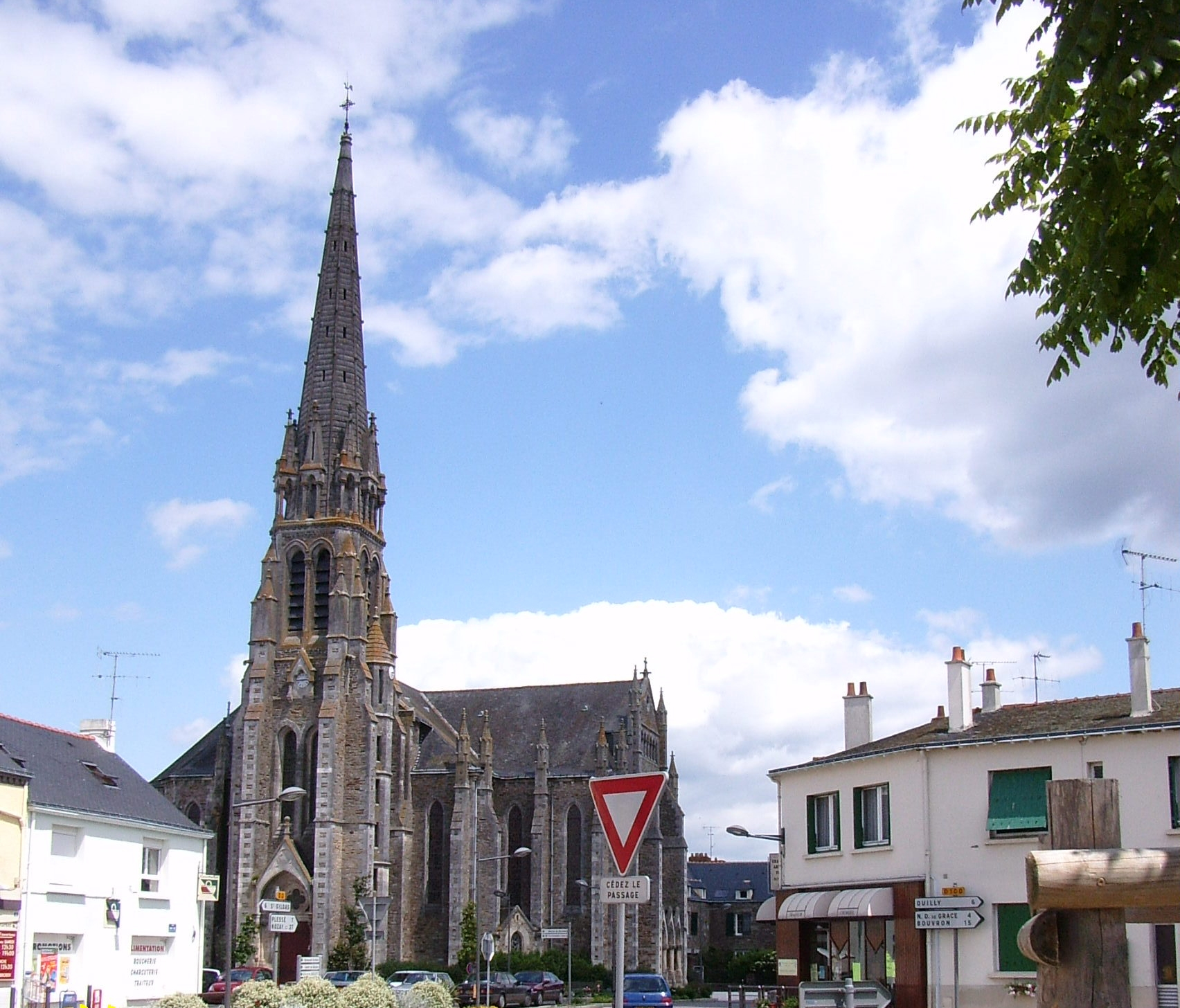

- Coat of arms
- Location of Guenrouet
- Location within France Location within Pays de la Loire
- Coordinates: 47°31′12″N 1°57′13″W
- Country: France
- Region: Pays de la Loire
- Department: Loire-Atlantique
- Arrondissement: Saint-Nazaire
- Canton: Pontchâteau
- Intercommunality: Pays de Pont-Château - Saint-Gildas-des-Bois

Government
  - Mayor (2020–2026): Frédéric Millet
- Area^{1}: 69.9 km^{2} (27.0 sq mi)
- Highest elevation: 73 m (240 ft)
- Lowest elevation: 0 m (0 ft)
- Population (2023): 3,673
  - Density: 52.5/km^{2} (136/sq mi)
- Time zone: UTC+01:00 (CET)
  - Summer (DST): UTC+02:00 (CEST)
- INSEE/Postal code: 44068 /44530
- ^{1} French Land Register data, which excludes lakes, ponds, glaciers > 1 km^{2} (0.386 sq mi or 247 acres) and river estuaries.

Guenrouet (French pronunciation: [ɡɛ̃ʁwɛt]; also spelled Guenrouët; Gallo: Genroèt or Ghinrouètt, Breton: Gwenred) is a commune in the Loire-Atlantique department in western France.

== Population ==
Historical population

Year	Pop.	±% p.a.
1793	1,605	—
1821	1,941	+0.68%
1846	2,580	+1.14%
1872	3,423	+1.09%
1901	3,639	+0.21%
1926	3,143	−0.58%
1946	2,753	−0.66%
1962	2,614	−0.32%
1968	2,368	−1.63%

Year	Pop.	±% p.a.
1975	2,156	−1.33%
1982	2,270	+0.74%
1990	2,383	+0.61%
1999	2,408	+0.12%
2007	2,833	+2.05%
2012	3,222	+2.61%
2017	3,349	+0.78%
2023	3,673	+1.55%

Source: EHESS and INSEE (1968-2023)

== See also ==
- Communes of the Loire-Atlantique department
