= Sainte-Anne-sur-Brivet =

- Commune
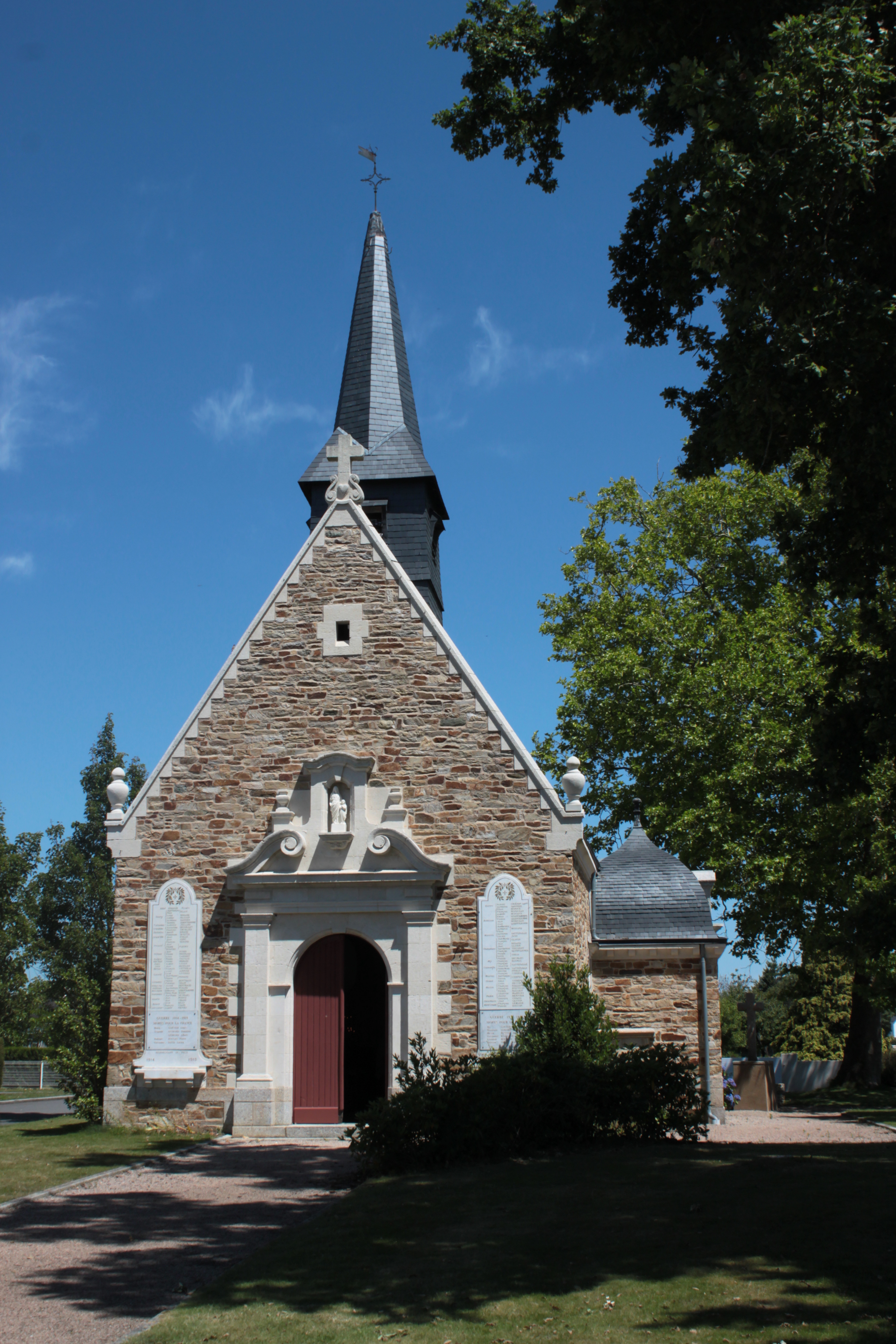

- Coat of arms
- Location of Sainte-Anne-sur-Brivet
- Location within France Location within Pays de la Loire
- Coordinates: 47°27′38″N 2°00′08″W
- Country: France
- Region: Pays de la Loire
- Department: Loire-Atlantique
- Arrondissement: Saint-Nazaire
- Canton: Pontchâteau
- Intercommunality: Pays de Pont-Château–Saint-Gildas-des-Bois

Government
  - Mayor (2020–2026): Jacques Bourdin
- Area^{1}: 25.99 km^{2} (10.03 sq mi)
- Elevation: 15 m (49 ft)
- Highest elevation: 37 m (121 ft)
- Lowest elevation: 0 m (0 ft)
- Population (2023): 3,063
  - Density: 117.9/km^{2} (305.2/sq mi)
- Time zone: UTC+01:00 (CET)
  - Summer (DST): UTC+02:00 (CEST)
- INSEE/Postal code: 44152 /44160
- ^{1} French Land Register data, which excludes lakes, ponds, glaciers > 1 km^{2} (0.386 sq mi or 247 acres) and river estuaries.

Sainte-Anne-sur-Brivet (French pronunciation: [sɛ̃t an syʁ bʁivɛ]; Breton: Santez-Anna-ar-Brived) is a commune in the Loire-Atlantique department in western France.

== Population ==
Historical population

Year	Pop.	±% p.a.
1876	1,530	—
1901	1,522	−0.02%
1926	1,360	−0.45%
1946	1,383	+0.08%
1962	1,321	−0.29%
1968	1,233	−1.14%
1975	1,532	+3.15%

Year	Pop.	±% p.a.
1982	2,004	+3.91%
1990	2,093	+0.54%
1999	1,925	−0.93%
2007	2,316	+2.34%
2012	2,724	+3.30%
2017	2,967	+1.72%
2023	3,063	+0.53%

Source: EHESS and INSEE (1968-2023)

== See also ==
- Communes of the Loire-Atlantique department
