= Crossac =

Crossac Croczac/Croça (Gallo) Kroazieg (Breton)
- Commune
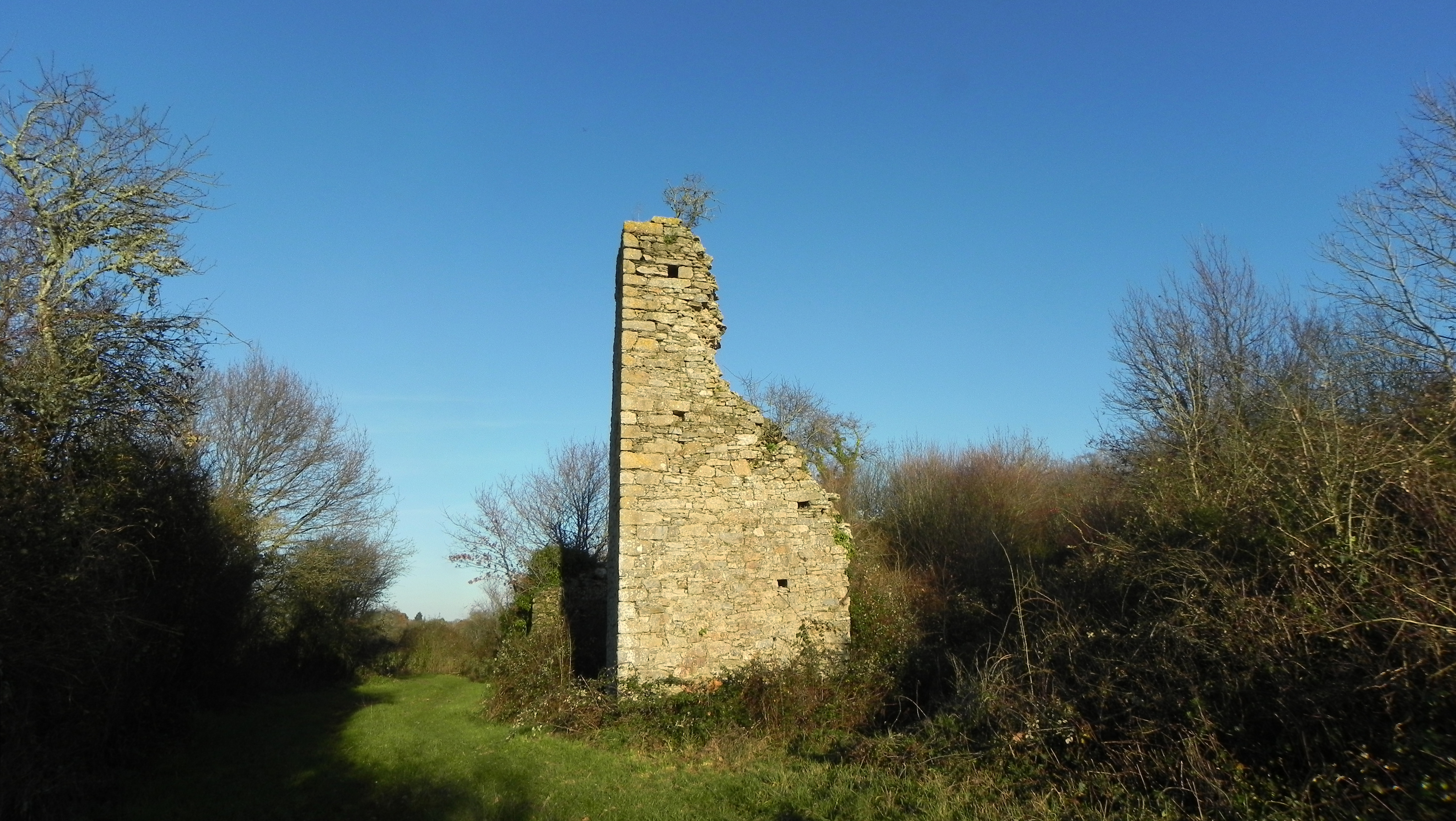
- Ruins of the Château de Lorieux

- Coat of arms
- Location of Crossac
- Location within France Location within Pays de la Loire
- Coordinates: 47°24′44″N 2°10′01″W
- Country: France
- Region: Pays de la Loire
- Department: Loire-Atlantique
- Arrondissement: Saint-Nazaire
- Canton: Pontchâteau
- Intercommunality: Pays de Pont-Château - Saint-Gildas-des-Bois

Government
  - Mayor (2020–2026): Olivier Demarty
- Area^{1}: 25.85 km^{2} (9.98 sq mi)
- Highest elevation: 22 m (72 ft)
- Lowest elevation: 0 m (0 ft)
- Population (2023): 2,974
  - Density: 115.0/km^{2} (298.0/sq mi)
- Time zone: UTC+01:00 (CET)
  - Summer (DST): UTC+02:00 (CEST)
- INSEE/Postal code: 44050 /44160
- ^{1} French Land Register data, which excludes lakes, ponds, glaciers > 1 km^{2} (0.386 sq mi or 247 acres) and river estuaries.

Crossac (French pronunciation: [kʁɔsak]; Gallo: Croczac or Croça, Breton: Kroazieg) is a commune in the Loire-Atlantique department in western France.

== Population ==
Historical population

Year	Pop.	±% p.a.
1793	1,263	—
1821	1,379	+0.31%
1846	1,582	+0.55%
1872	1,591	+0.02%
1901	1,710	+0.25%
1926	1,492	−0.54%
1946	1,501	+0.03%
1962	1,517	+0.07%
1968	1,558	+0.45%

Year	Pop.	±% p.a.
1975	1,658	+0.89%
1982	2,067	+3.20%
1990	2,277	+1.22%
1999	2,136	−0.71%
2007	2,579	+2.38%
2012	2,808	+1.72%
2017	2,952	+1.01%
2023	2,974	+0.12%

Source: EHESS and INSEE (1968-2023)

== See also ==
- Communes of the Loire-Atlantique department
- Parc naturel régional de Brière
