= Saint-André-des-Eaux, Loire-Atlantique =

Saint-André-des-Eaux
- Commune
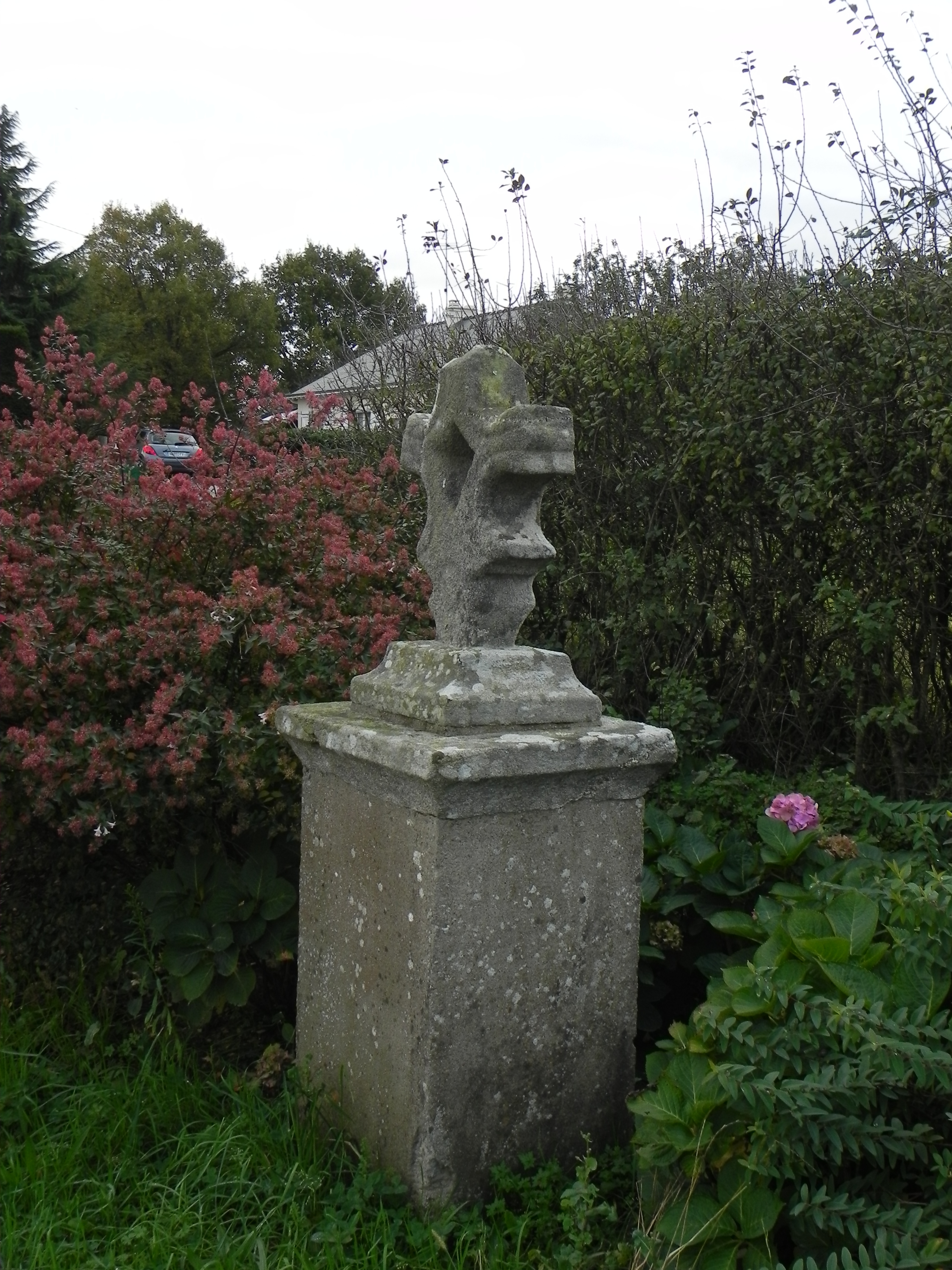
- Village cross at Jau

- Coat of arms
- Location of Saint-André-des-Eaux
- Location within France Location within Pays de la Loire
- Coordinates: 47°18′53″N 2°18′35″W
- Country: France
- Region: Pays de la Loire
- Department: Loire-Atlantique
- Arrondissement: Saint-Nazaire
- Canton: La Baule-Escoublac
- Intercommunality: CA Région Nazairienne et Estuaire

Government
  - Mayor (2022–2026): Mathieu Coent
- Area^{1}: 24.71 km^{2} (9.54 sq mi)
- Elevation: 20 m (66 ft)
- Highest elevation: 41 m (135 ft)
- Lowest elevation: 0 m (0 ft)
- Population (2023): 7,013
  - Density: 283.8/km^{2} (735.1/sq mi)
- Time zone: UTC+01:00 (CET)
  - Summer (DST): UTC+02:00 (CEST)
- INSEE/Postal code: 44151 /44117
- ^{1} French Land Register data, which excludes lakes, ponds, glaciers > 1 km^{2} (0.386 sq mi or 247 acres) and river estuaries.

Saint-André-des-Eaux (French pronunciation: [sɛ̃.t‿ɑ̃dʁe de.z‿o]; Breton: Sant-Andrev-an-Doureier) is a commune in the Loire-Atlantique department in western France.

== Population ==
Historical population

Year	Pop.	±% p.a.
1793	1,213	—
1800	1,104	−1.34%
1806	1,140	+0.54%
1821	1,280	+0.78%
1831	1,379	+0.75%
1841	1,420	+0.29%
1846	1,477	+0.79%
1851	1,452	−0.34%
1856	1,429	−0.32%
1861	1,590	+2.16%
1866	1,669	+0.97%
1872	1,607	−0.63%
1876	1,600	−0.11%
1881	1,638	+0.47%
1886	1,644	+0.07%
1891	1,682	+0.46%
1896	1,692	+0.12%
1901	1,702	+0.12%

Year	Pop.	±% p.a.
1906	1,716	+0.16%
1911	1,628	−1.05%
1921	1,448	−1.16%
1926	1,403	−0.63%
1931	1,434	+0.44%
1936	1,345	−1.27%
1946	1,330	−0.11%
1954	1,491	+1.44%
1962	1,545	+0.45%
1968	1,554	+0.10%
1975	1,833	+2.39%
1982	2,541	+4.78%
1990	2,919	+1.75%
1999	3,532	+2.14%
2007	5,079	+4.65%
2012	5,607	+2.00%
2017	6,473	+2.91%
2023	7,013	+1.34%

Source: EHESS and INSEE (1968-2023)

== See also ==
- La Baule - Guérande Peninsula
- Communes of the Loire-Atlantique department
- Parc naturel régional de Brière
