= Sévérac =

- Commune
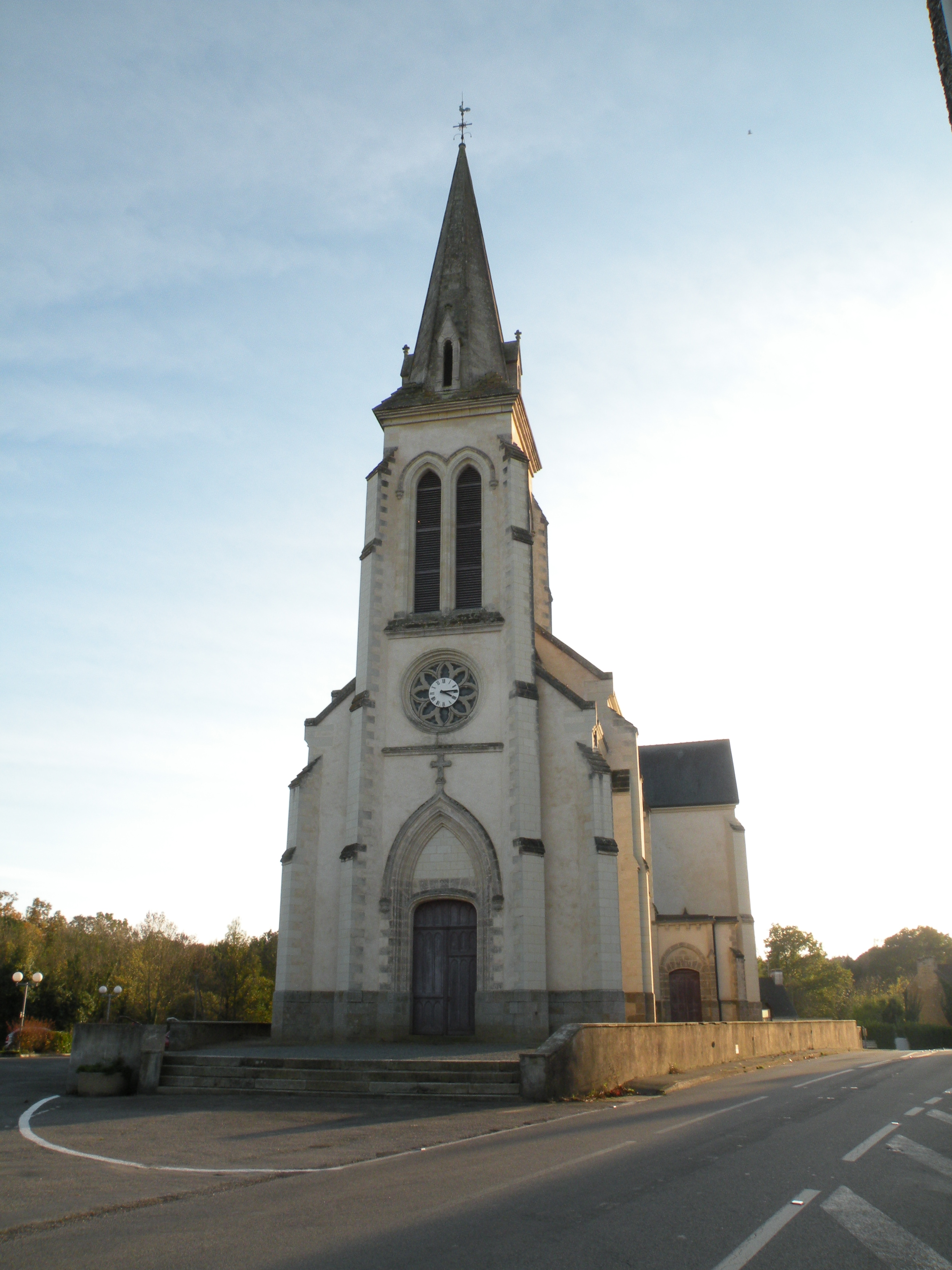
- The church of Saint-Jean-Baptiste, in Sévérac

- Coat of arms
- Location of Sévérac
- Location within France Location within Pays de la Loire
- Coordinates: 47°33′03″N 2°04′32″W
- Country: France
- Region: Pays de la Loire
- Department: Loire-Atlantique
- Arrondissement: Saint-Nazaire
- Canton: Pontchâteau
- Intercommunality: Pays de Pont-Château - Saint-Gildas-des-Bois

Government
  - Mayor (2020–2026): Didier Pecot
- Area^{1}: 22.41 km^{2} (8.65 sq mi)
- Highest elevation: 71 m (233 ft)
- Lowest elevation: 0 m (0 ft)
- Population (2023): 1,690
  - Density: 75.4/km^{2} (195/sq mi)
- Demonym(s): Sévéracaises, Sévéracais
- Time zone: UTC+01:00 (CET)
  - Summer (DST): UTC+02:00 (CEST)
- INSEE/Postal code: 44196 /44530
- Website: http://www.cc-paysdepontchateau.fr/
- ^{1} French Land Register data, which excludes lakes, ponds, glaciers > 1 km^{2} (0.386 sq mi or 247 acres) and river estuaries.

Sévérac (French pronunciation: [seveʁak]; Breton: Severeg) is a small commune in the Loire-Atlantique department in western France. As of 2022, it had around 1,693 inhabitants and covers about 22.4 km².

The name likely derives from Latin Severus or the root "Sev-" related to water, referring to land belonging to someone named Severus between rivers.

== See also ==
- Communes of the Loire-Atlantique department
