= Saint-Gildas-des-Bois =

- Commune
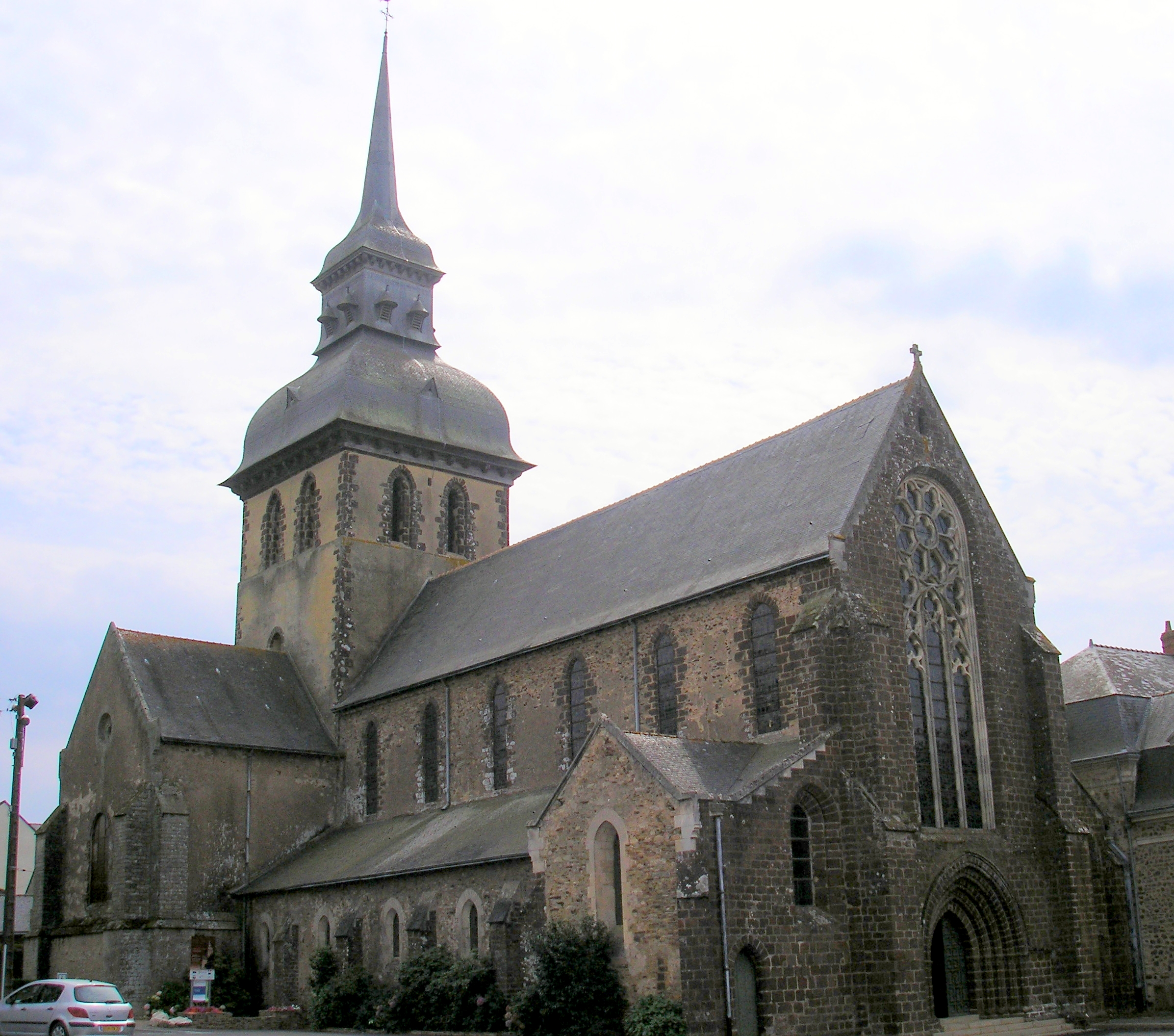
- The church in Saint-Gildas-des-Bois

- Coat of arms
- Location of Saint-Gildas-des-Bois
- Location within France Location within Pays de la Loire
- Coordinates: 47°31′02″N 2°02′14″W
- Country: France
- Region: Pays de la Loire
- Department: Loire-Atlantique
- Arrondissement: Saint-Nazaire
- Canton: Pontchâteau
- Intercommunality: Pays de Pont-Château–Saint-Gildas-des-Bois

Government
  - Mayor (2020–2026): Jean-François Legrand
- Area^{1}: 33.42 km^{2} (12.90 sq mi)
- Elevation: 16 m (52 ft)
- Highest elevation: 74 m (243 ft)
- Lowest elevation: 1 m (3.3 ft)
- Population (2023): 3,860
  - Density: 115/km^{2} (299/sq mi)
- Time zone: UTC+01:00 (CET)
  - Summer (DST): UTC+02:00 (CEST)
- INSEE/Postal code: 44161 /44530
- ^{1} French Land Register data, which excludes lakes, ponds, glaciers > 1 km^{2} (0.386 sq mi or 247 acres) and river estuaries.

Saint-Gildas-des-Bois (French pronunciation: [sɛ̃ ʒilda de bwa]; Breton: Gweltaz-Lambrizig) is a commune in the Loire-Atlantique department in western France.

== Population ==
Historical population

Year	Pop.	±% p.a.
1793	1,258	—
1821	1,233	−0.07%
1846	1,572	+0.98%
1872	2,311	+1.49%
1901	2,731	+0.58%
1926	2,243	−0.78%
1946	2,385	+0.31%
1962	2,659	+0.68%
1968	2,510	−0.96%

Year	Pop.	±% p.a.
1975	2,522	+0.07%
1982	2,997	+2.50%
1990	3,126	+0.53%
1999	3,059	−0.24%
2007	3,339	+1.10%
2012	3,534	+1.14%
2017	3,777	+1.34%
2023	3,860	+0.36%

Source: EHESS and INSEE (1968-2023)

== See also ==
- Communes of the Loire-Atlantique department
