= FC La Chapelle-des-Marais =

French football club

- Full name: Football Club de La Chapelle-des-Marais
- Founded: 1989
- Ground: Stade Municipal de la Perriere, La Chapelle-des-Marais
- Capacity: 1,500
- Chairman: Nicolas BELLIOT & Laurent HALGAND
- Manager: Anthony Anizon
- League: R2
- Website: https://fccm-44.fr
Home colours

Football Club de La Chapelle-des-Marais is a French association football club founded in 1989. They are based in the town of La Chapelle-des-Marais, Loire-Atlantique and their home stadium is the Stade Municipal de la Perriere. As of the 2009–10 season, they play in the Championnat de France amateur 2 Group H.

The club reached the 8th round of the 1998–99 Coupe de France.
