= Brière Regional Natural Park =

Regional natural park of France

- IUCN category V (protected landscape/seascape)
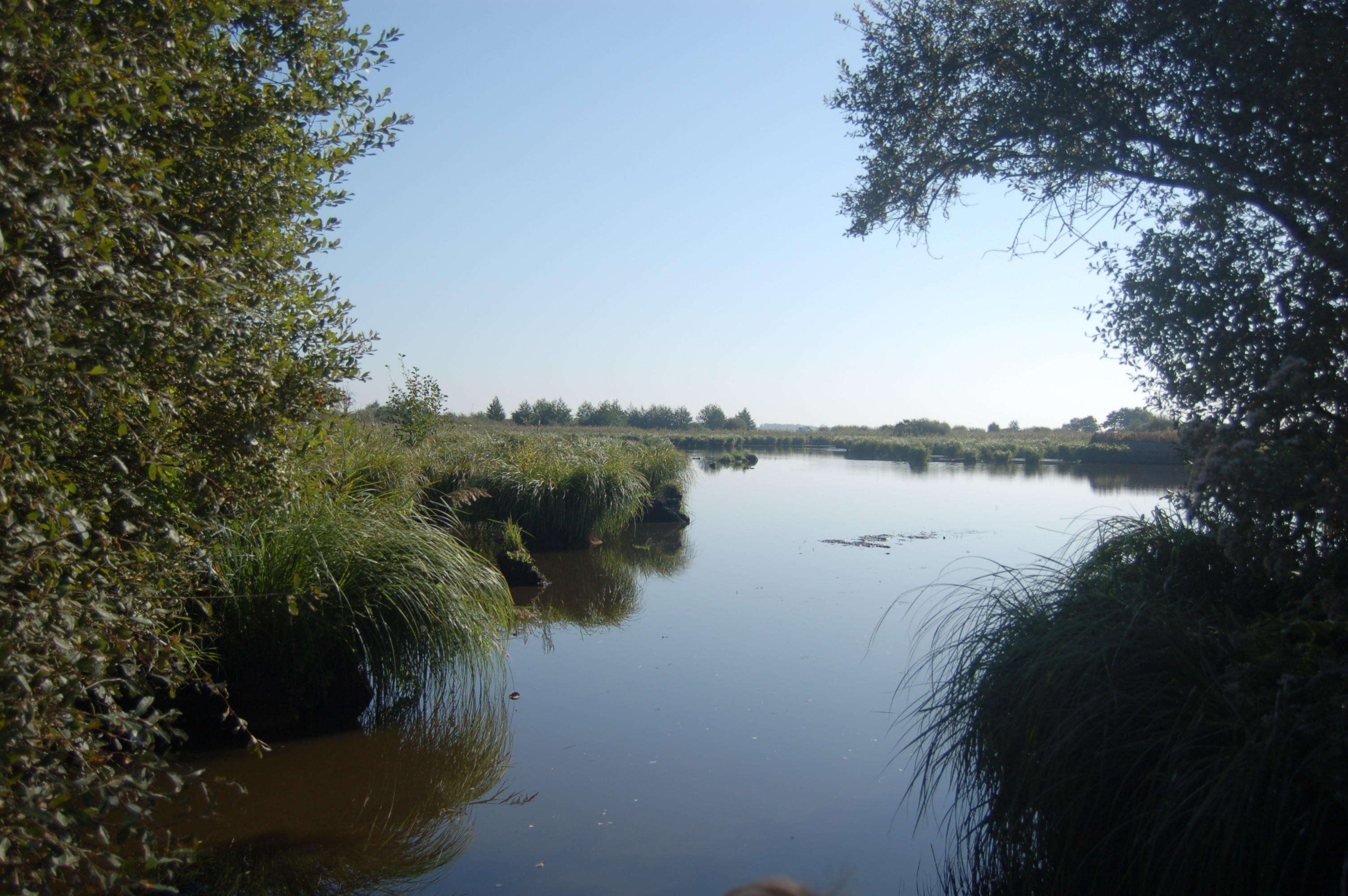
- Interactive map of Brière Regional Natural Park
- Location: Pays de la Loire, Loire-Atlantique, France
- Coordinates: 47.3691°N 2.259°W
- Established: 1970
- Governing body: Fédération des parcs naturels régionaux de France
- Website: http://uk.parc-naturel-briere.fr/

Brière Regional Natural Park (French: Parc naturel régional de Brière, pronounced [paʁk natyʁɛl ʁeʒjɔnal də bʁijɛʁ]; Breton: Park naturel rannvroel Brière) is a protected area in the Pays de la Loire region of France. It covers a total area of 40,000 hectares (99,000 acres) with a core of wetland, the Grande Brière, covering approximately 7,000 hectares (17,000 acres). The area was officially designated as a regional natural park in 1970.

The park includes the following member communes:

- Assérac
- Crossac
- Donges
- Guerande
- Herbignac
- La Baule-Escoublac
- La Chapelle-des-Marais
- Missillac
- Montoir-de-Bretagne
- Pornichet
- Prinquiau
- Saint-André-des-Eaux
- Saint-Joachim
- Saint-Lyphard
- Saint-Malo-de-Guersac
- Saint-Molf
- Saint-Nazaire
- Sainte-Reine-de-Bretagne
- Trignac

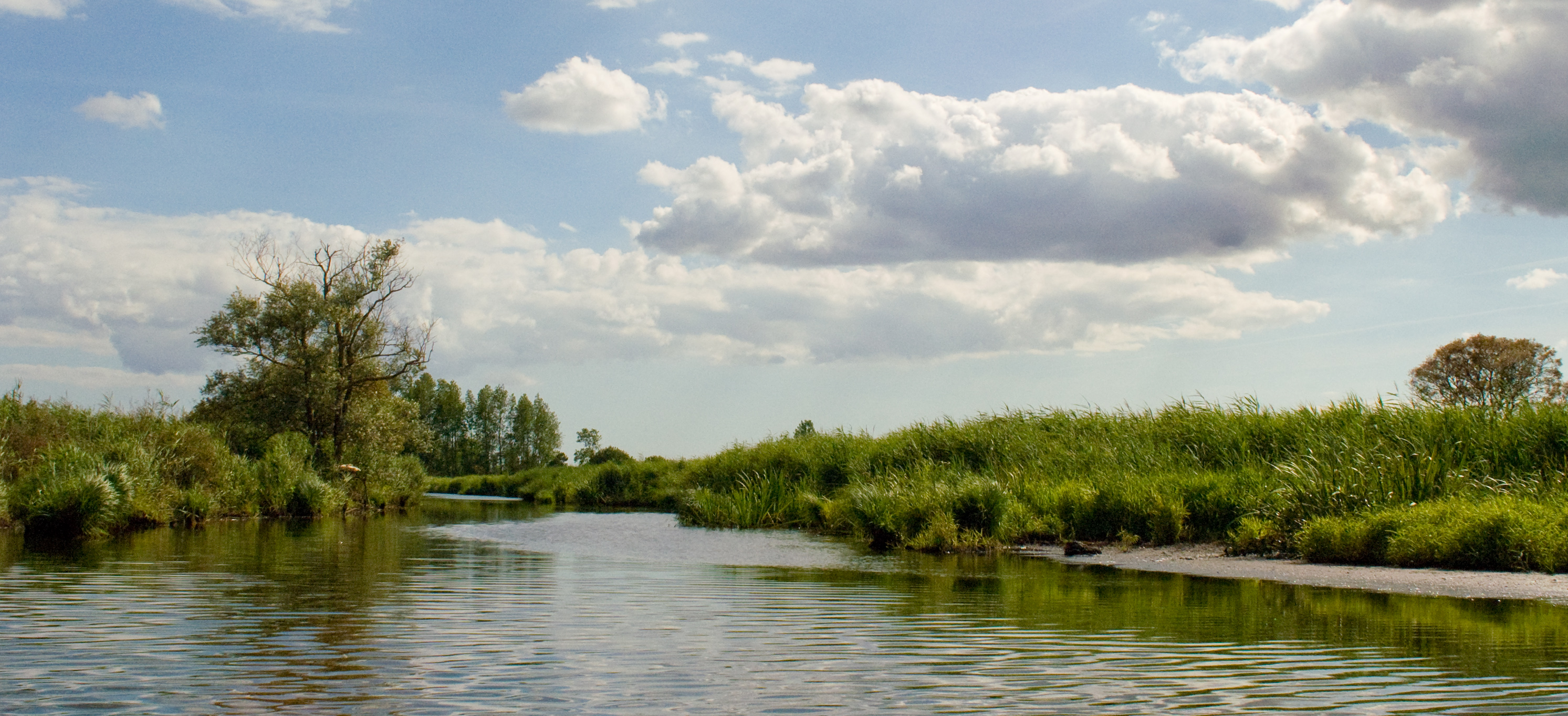
Panorama of Brière marshland

== See also ==
- List of regional natural parks of France
