= Saint-Joachim =

- Commune
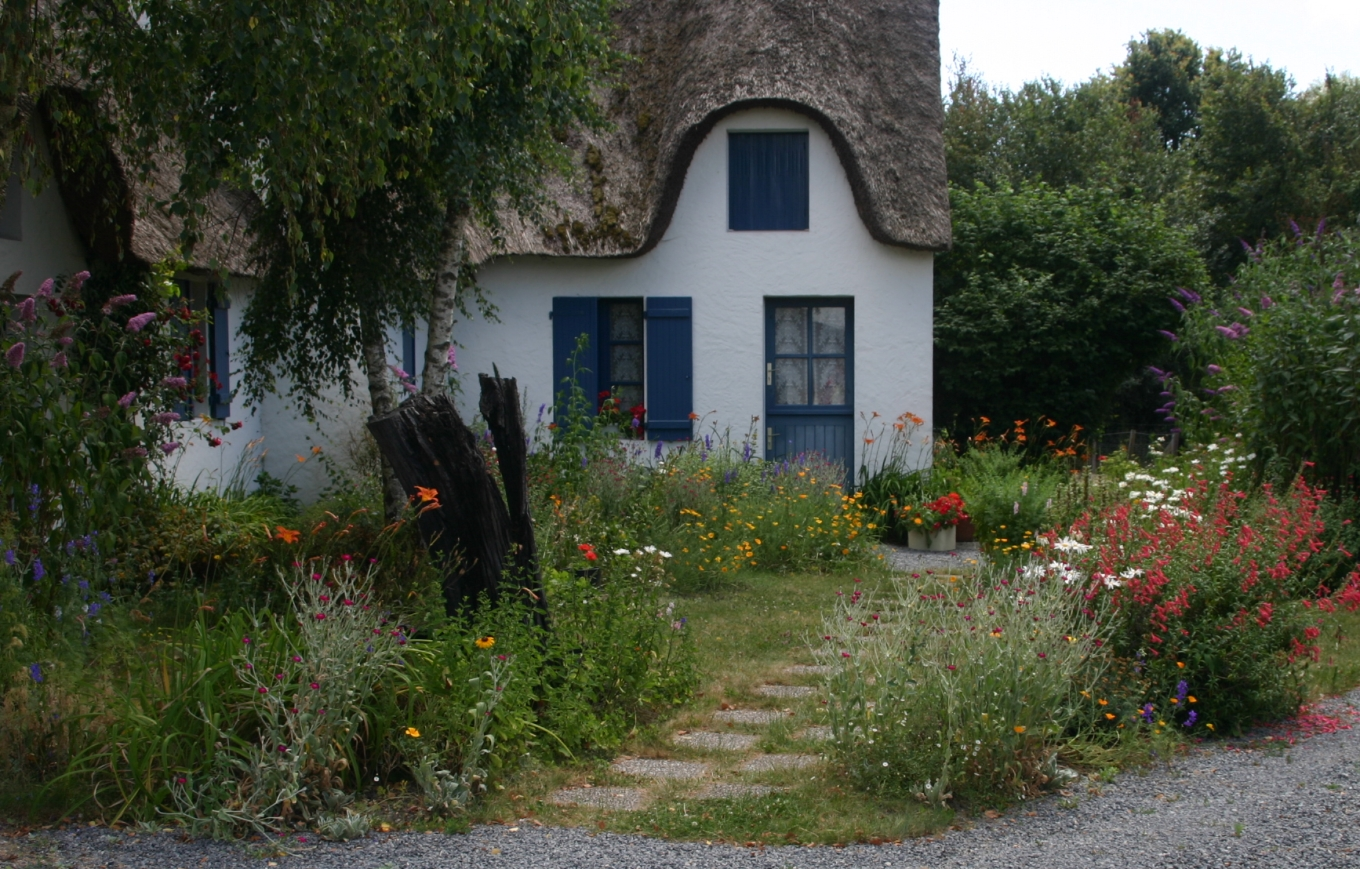
- A Briéronne house on the island of Fédrun
- Location of Saint-Joachim
- Location within France Location within Pays de la Loire
- Coordinates: 47°22′59″N 2°11′58″W
- Country: France
- Region: Pays de la Loire
- Department: Loire-Atlantique
- Arrondissement: Saint-Nazaire
- Canton: Guérande
- Intercommunality: CA Région Nazairienne et Estuaire

Government
  - Mayor (2020–2026): Raphaël Salaün
- Area^{1}: 86.22 km^{2} (33.29 sq mi)
- Elevation: 6 m (20 ft)
- Highest elevation: 9 m (30 ft)
- Lowest elevation: 0 m (0 ft)
- Population (2023): 4,112
  - Density: 47.69/km^{2} (123.5/sq mi)
- Time zone: UTC+01:00 (CET)
  - Summer (DST): UTC+02:00 (CEST)
- INSEE/Postal code: 44168 /44720
- ^{1} French Land Register data, which excludes lakes, ponds, glaciers > 1 km^{2} (0.386 sq mi or 247 acres) and river estuaries.

Saint-Joachim (French pronunciation: [sɛ̃ ʒɔaʃɛ̃]; Breton: Sant-Yoasin) is a commune in the Loire-Atlantique department in western France. It is in the centre of the Brière marsh, and comprises a group of "islands" within the marsh.

== Population ==
Historical population
Year	Pop.	±% p.a.
1968	4,152	—
1975	4,161	+0.03%
1982	4,253	+0.31%
1990	3,994	−0.78%
1999	3,772	−0.63%
2007	3,936	+0.53%
2012	3,960	+0.12%
2017	4,033	+0.37%
2023	4,112	+0.32%
Source: INSEE

== See also ==
- Communes of the Loire-Atlantique department
- Parc naturel régional de Brière
