= Sainte-Reine-de-Bretagne =

Sainte-Reine-de-Bretagne Santez-Rouanez-Breizh (Breton)
- Commune
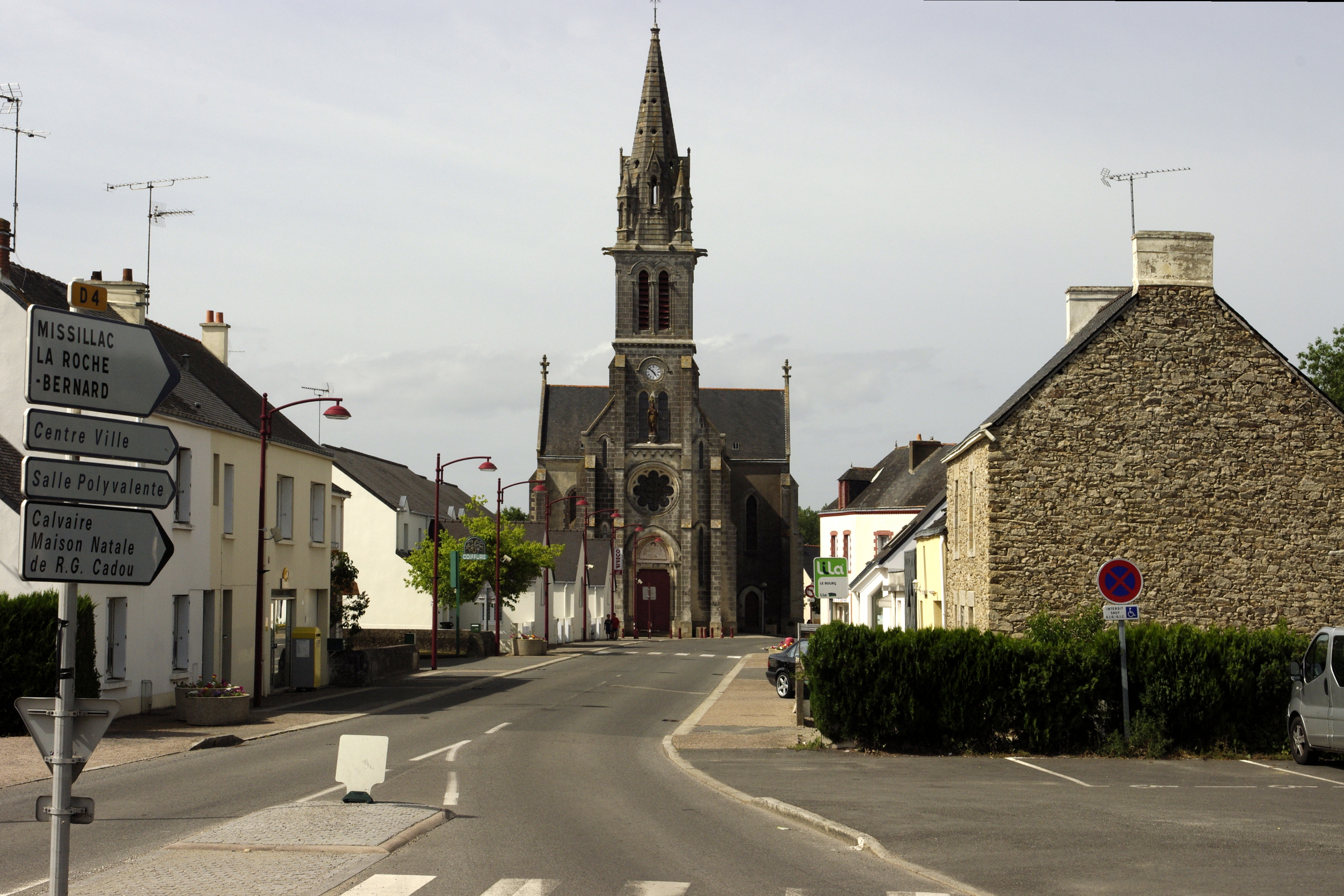

- Coat of arms
- Location of Sainte-Reine-de-Bretagne
- Location within France Location within Pays de la Loire
- Coordinates: 47°26′29″N 2°11′33″W
- Country: France
- Region: Pays de la Loire
- Department: Loire-Atlantique
- Arrondissement: Saint-Nazaire
- Canton: Pontchâteau
- Intercommunality: Pays de Pont-Château–Saint-Gildas-des-Bois

Government
  - Mayor (2020–2026): Michel Perrais
- Area^{1}: 19.73 km^{2} (7.62 sq mi)
- Elevation: 12 m (39 ft)
- Highest elevation: 37 m (121 ft)
- Lowest elevation: 0 m (0 ft)
- Population (2023): 2,484
  - Density: 125.9/km^{2} (326.1/sq mi)
- Time zone: UTC+01:00 (CET)
  - Summer (DST): UTC+02:00 (CEST)
- INSEE/Postal code: 44189 /44160
- ^{1} French Land Register data, which excludes lakes, ponds, glaciers > 1 km^{2} (0.386 sq mi or 247 acres) and river estuaries.

Sainte-Reine-de-Bretagne (French pronunciation: [sɛ̃ ʁɛn də bʁətaɲ], literally Saint Regina of Brittany; Breton: Santez-Rouanez-Breizh) is a commune in the Loire-Atlantique department in western France.

== Population ==
Historical population

Year	Pop.	±% p.a.
1793	600	—
1821	679	+0.44%
1846	830	+0.81%
1872	967	+0.59%
1901	1,128	+0.53%
1926	1,144	+0.06%
1946	1,170	+0.11%
1962	1,260	+0.46%
1968	1,303	+0.56%

Year	Pop.	±% p.a.
1975	1,497	+2.00%
1982	1,768	+2.41%
1990	1,779	+0.08%
1999	1,681	−0.63%
2007	1,849	+1.20%
2012	2,202	+3.56%
2017	2,374	+1.52%
2023	2,484	+0.76%

Source: EHESS and INSEE (1968-2023)

== See also ==
- Communes of the Loire-Atlantique department
- Parc naturel régional de Brière
