= Blockade of the Vilaine =

Part of the Seven Years' War (1759–62)

Date	November 21, 1759 - April 25, 1762
Location	Mouth of the Vilaine river 47°29′35″N 2°26′30″W

Belligerents
Kingdom of France	Kingdom of Great Britain

Commanders and leaders
Emmanuel Armand de Vignerot du Plessis	Edward Hawke

Strength
11 ships of the line	7 ships of the line
- Location within France

The blockade of the Vilaine was a naval military operation that followed the Battle of Quiberon Bay, where the French and British fleets clashed during the Seven Years' War off the coast of Brittany. The initial naval warfare occurred on November 20, 1759, between the islands of Hoedic and Dumet and Le Croisic. After the battle, eleven French ships sought refuge in the Vilaine estuary near Damgan, Billiers, and Pénestin, and later moved further inland to Arzal and Camoël to avoid enemy attacks. For over two years, there was political intrigue among noble officers loyal to Admiral de Conflans, who advocated for the destruction of the stranded ships, and the Duke of Aiguillon, who preferred a gradual departure. Around seven thousand crew members settled at the mouth of the Vilaine and the port of La Roche-Bernard. Despite financial constraints from the Royal Treasury, the presence of the fleet and its crews brought economic benefits to the local area.

The blockade, enforced by Admiral Hawke's squadron and Officer Robert Duff's unit in the Gulf of Morbihan, was lifted on April 25, 1762, allowing the last French ships to escape to Brest or Rochefort. All ships, except for the Inflexible which was damaged in a storm and subsequently dismantled, successfully departed the estuary in pairs, beginning on January 6, 1761.

== Background ==
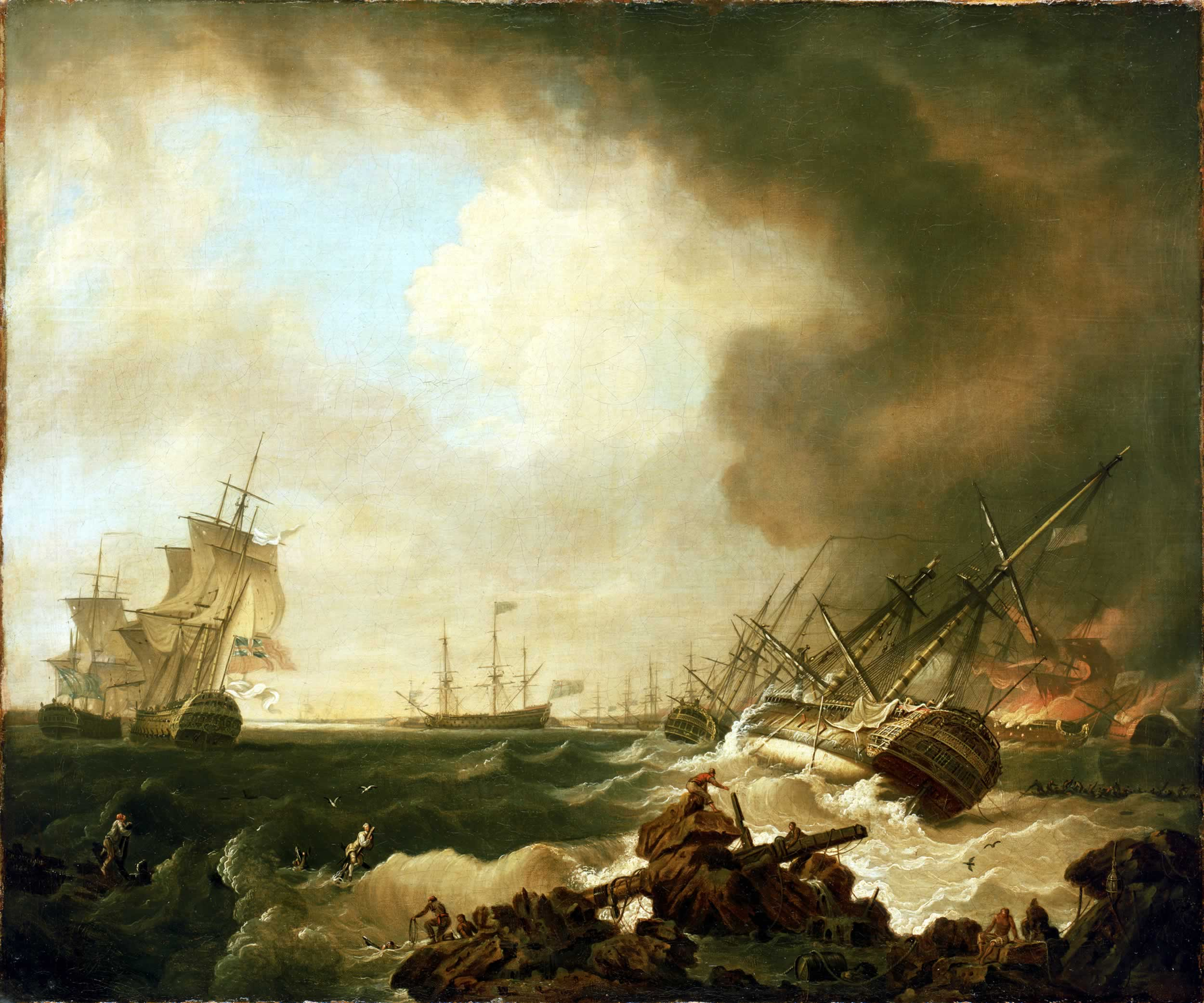
The Battle of Quiberon Bay, oil on canvas by Richard Wright.

On November 20, 1759, the Battle of Quiberon Bay ended in a disaster for the French Navy against the English. The battle took place between Le Croisic, Dumet Island, and Hoedic Island. By the evening of the battle, seven ships (Glorieux, Robuste, Inflexible, Dragon, Éveillé, Brillant, and Sphinx) accompanied by two frigates (Vestale and Aigrette) and two corvettes (Calypso and Prince Noir) arrived at the entrance to the Vilaine. Due to poor visibility, the Glorieux and the Éveillé ran aground.

To defend against attacks from Hawke's pursuing squadron, Emmanuel-Armand de Vignerot du Plessis, Duke of Aiguillon, and the commander of the Glorieux, René Villars de la Brosse-Raquin, organized the defense of the entrance to the Vilaine. Cannons from the stranded ships were installed in the guardhouses of Kervoyal, Pen Lan, and Pénestin to lighten the ships. Guided by local pilots (Note: The pilots were Louis Le Guennec, Joseph Le Goff from Billiers, and Jean Bideau from Damgan.) and aided by favorable winds and the rising tide, the captains chose to anchor initially at the port of Tréhiguier, a village in Pénestin where a lighthouse was built in 1881. However, the fleet remained within sight of the English, who prepared fire ships (burning longboats). The ships then moved further into the estuary to Vieille-Roche, a locality in Arzal, an old ferry crossing now the site of the Arzal-Camoël dam since 1970, after unloading their cannons, cannonballs, and chains to lighten their load.

Plan of the Battle of Quiberon Bay, with the dislocation of the French squadron and the escape of some of the ships to the Vilaine River.

The damages to the Inflexible and the Éveillé, which had hit shoals while entering the estuary, were minor. However, the Glorieux suffered a leak, and the Inflexible lost its foresail and bowsprit. Land forces were mobilized to assist the squadron, with King Louis XV sending officer Beaussier de Châteauvert to the port of Vieille-Roche. The Broël castle in Arzal also opened its doors to serve as a field hospital.

Once the ships were safe, Louis XV expressed dissatisfaction and outlined two priorities. He instructed Villars de la Brosse-Raquin to promptly send the ships back to Brest:

[…] His Majesty cannot understand how you could have sought such a refuge. His Majesty can only consider it very unfavorable under the circumstances. He instructs you to carefully examine what measures can be put in place so that the ships can return to sea and reach Brest, if not together, which will undoubtedly face many difficulties, then at least one after the other, if that is practicable […]

— Letter from the Minister of the Navy Berryer to Villars de La Brosse, December 12, 1759.

The second priority was to minimize the costs necessary to maintain the ships and their crews during the fleet's stasis:

[…] you will try to avoid expenses that would be very burdensome at a time when funds are very scarce […] it is not that I do not understand that your situation is very embarrassing and most unfortunate, but who can be blamed for this? We must not add to a great misfortune the misfortune of unnecessary expenses […]

— Letter from the Minister of the Navy Berryer to Villars de La Brosse, December 1, 1759.

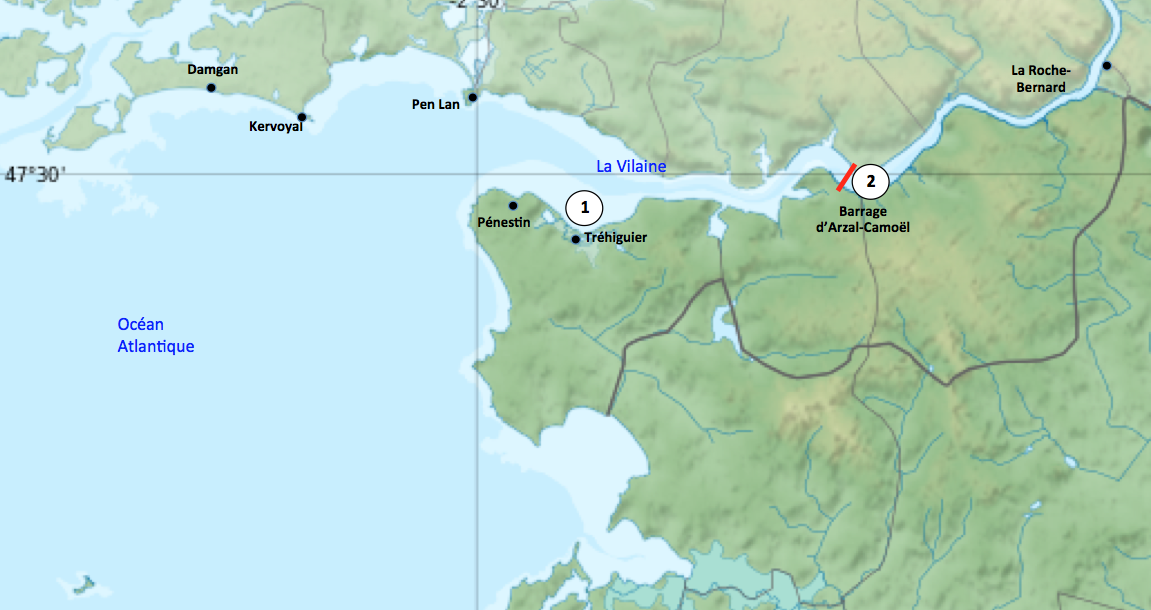
Successive anchorages by the French fleet in the mouth of the Vilaine during the blockade. 1: Tréhiguier anchorage; 2: Vieille-Roche anchorage.

On January 1, 1760, the situation worsened as the Inflexible was pushed by a storm onto a rock, leading to its dismantling to salvage whatever could be saved. This incurred additional expenses.

It took over two and a half years of effort for the two officers appointed by the Duke of Aiguillon, Charles-Henri-Louis d’Arsac de Ternay, (Note: D'Arsac de Ternay was appointed captain on January 10, 1761, in recognition of his efforts during the blockade.) and Charles Jean d’Hector, (Note: D'Hector was appointed captain on January 15, 1762, for saving the Brillant and the Éveillé during the blockade.) to free the ships from the Vilaine.

The conditions for a potential escape were hotly debated between d’Aiguillon and Villars de la Brosse. The English squadron's ships continued to patrol the Quiberon Bay, preventing any movement of the French fleet in the region.

[…] we keep them under lock and key, and it would take a miracle to let them out […]

— Richard Howe, Admiral of the fleet, to the Duke of Aiguillon.

To pass, they needed exceptional weather conditions: a pitch-dark night, a receding spring tide, and a strong east wind to propel the ships out to sea.

On the night of May 24–25, 1760, the Prince Noir successfully evaded English surveillance and escaped, heading towards the Antilles.

Three operations were carried out to outwit the English blockade and release the seven ships and the frigate trapped in the Vilaine. On the night of January 6–7, 1761, amidst heavy fog and later a violent storm, the Dragon and the Brillant, commanded by Ternay and d'Hector, along with the Vestale, the Aigrette, and the Calypso, successfully made their way to Brest or Rochefort. The frigate Vestale was recaptured on January 9 by HMS Unicorn, while the Aigrette emerged victorious in its encounter with the Seahorse. On November 28, 1761, the Robuste and the Éveillé could escape, followed by the Glorieux and the Sphinx on April 25, 1762. The wreck of the Inflexible now lies beneath the waters of the Arzal dam.

== The forces at work ==
=== The ships ===
French forces
Name	Rate	Year built	Command	Cannons (Note: The number of cannons listed in these tables is theoretical and does not necessarily correspond to the actual number of artillery pieces carried by the ship. Rather, it serves as a characteristic of the class it belongs to. Therefore, one refers to a "74" or a "50.")	Crew	Notes
Robuste	Ship of the line	1758	Fragnier de Vienne	74	650	Escaped from the Vilaine estuary on November 28, 1761.
Glorieux	Ship of the line	1756	Villars de la Brosse	74	650	Escaped from the Vilaine estuary on April 25, 1762.
Dragon	Ship of the line	1745	Vassor de la Touche	64	450	Escaped from the Vilaine estuary on the night of January 6–7, 1761.
Éveillé	Ship of the line	1752	La Prévalais de La Roche	64	450	Escaped from the Vilaine estuary on November 28, 1761.
Brillant	Ship of the line	1757	Kérémar de Boischâteau	64	450	Escaped from the Vilaine estuary on the night of January 6–7, 1761.
Sphinx	Ship of the line	1755	De Gouyon, chevalier de Coutance La Selle	64	450	Escaped from the Vilaine estuary on April 25, 1762.
Inflexible	Ship of the line	1755	Tancrède, chevalier de Caumont	64	450	Driven ashore by a storm on January 1, 1760, then dismantled.
Vestale	Frigate	1757	de Montfiquet (Note: Commanding lieutenant.)	36	220	Escaped from the Vilaine estuary on the night of January 6–7, 1761, recaptured by the English on January 9.
Aigrette	Frigate	1756	de Longueville (Note: de Longueville) (Note: Commanding lieutenant.)	34		Escaped from the Vilaine estuary on the night of January 6–7, 1761.
Calypso	Corvette	1756	Paul Alexandre du Bois-Berthelot (Note: Ensign)	16		Escaped from the Vilaine estuary on the night of January 6–7, 1761.
Prince Noir	Corvette	1759	Pierre-Joseph Kergariou de Roscouet (Note: Ensign during the battle. His brother, Thibaud-René Kergariou-Locmaria, fought on the Orient.)	6		Escaped from the Vilaine estuary on the night of January 6–7, 1761.
Source of commands: Guy Le Moing, Les Cahiers du Pays de Guérande, 2011; Pierre de La Condamine, Le combat des Cardinaux; Georges Lacour-Gayet, La Marine militaire sous le règne de Louis XV, appendix X archive, 1910.

Ships of the line are classified by rate based on their firepower. The most powerful ships trapped in the Vilaine estuary were of the third rate, which included 74-gun ships with two decks, equipped with fourteen 36-pounders and fifteen 18-pounders, and 64-gun ships armed with thirteen 24-pounders and fourteen 12-pounders. (Note: First-rate French ships were three-deckers, none of which were present at the Cardinaux. Second-rate ships are 80-gun vessels with two batteries. The lower battery was equipped with 15 36-pounder guns on each side, while the upper battery had 16 18-pounder guns.) Ships below 64 guns were no longer considered sufficiently armed or robust to hold a place in a line of battle, such as 50-gun ships. (Note: In emergencies, they were included in the battle line, as was the case in the Indian Ocean.)

On the English side, the blockade of the Gulf of Morbihan was maintained. Two frigates, the HMS Unicorn and HMS Seahorse, patrolled the Vilaine. At the same time, five ships cruised between Dumet Island and Pénerf, a village in Damgan, under Commodore Robert Duff’s orders.

Duff's squadron
Name	Year built	Command	Cannons	Crew	Notes
Rochester	1749	Robert Duff	50	350	
Portland	1744	Marriot Arbuthnot	50	350	
Falkland	1744	Francis Samuel Drake	50	350	
Chatham	1758	John Lockhart-Ross	50	350	
Belliqueux	1756	Thomas Saumarez	64	500	It did not participate in the Battle of Quiberon Bay; the French ship captured on November 8, 1758, by the Antelope, commanded by T. Saumarez.

=== Officers ===
==== French side ====
Apart from Louis XV and his minister Berryer, who had a comprehensive understanding of the Seven Years' War and its consequences, the blockade of the Vilaine was characterized by the clash between two strong personalities and their respective supporters: Emmanuel-Armand de Vignerot du Plessis-Richelieu, Duke of Aiguillon, and Villars de La Brosse, the noble commander of the Glorieux. The Duke of Aiguillon argued for a discreet exit from the Vilaine estuary instead of dismantling the ships, citing the high cost in light of the economic recommendations received. On the other hand, Villars de la Brosse believed the fleet was beyond salvage and advocated for its complete dismantling, aligning with Berryer's stance.

Following this, d’Aiguillon orchestrated a cabal to counter the "reds" (a nickname for the noble naval officers) and replace them with officers loyal to his cause. He ensured that the crews would accept these replacements. D’Aiguillon persuaded Berryer to ask Louis XV to order the complete disarmament of the blockaded fleet, aligning with the recommendations of the "Reds." He also requested retaining the necessary troops to guard the ships and the land batteries that had been installed. Concurrently, he planned to order two ships to leave the Vilaine immediately after the disarmament order was given to exploit the confusion caused by the order. The officers he recommended (known only to d’Aiguillon at the time of his proposal to Berryer) were the chevaliers de Ternay from the Inflexible and d’Hector, the deputy mayor of the Navy in Brest. The plan involved Ternay taking leave to remove him from his current command and Berryer drafting a false order requesting d’Hector's availability.

Meanwhile, Admiral Hubert de Brienne de Conflans supported Villars at Versailles. He had appointed him to lead the small squadron because he was "the most senior captain [...] whose talents and merits are known." However, Conflans fell victim to the repercussions of the disastrous outcome of the Battle of the Cardinaux. Villars was eventually arrested and detained at the Château de Saumur. With Villars sidelined, d’Aiguillon had a clear path for his exfiltration plan.

Key French figures (selection)

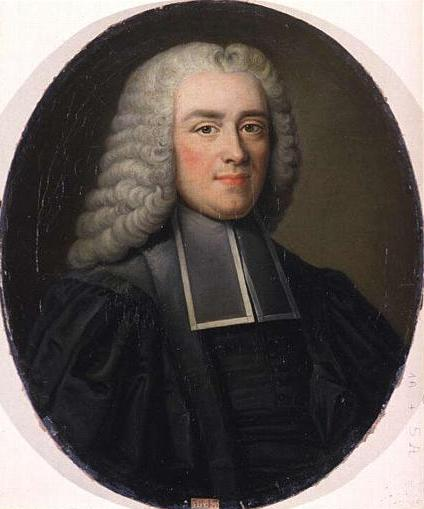
Minister Berryer.

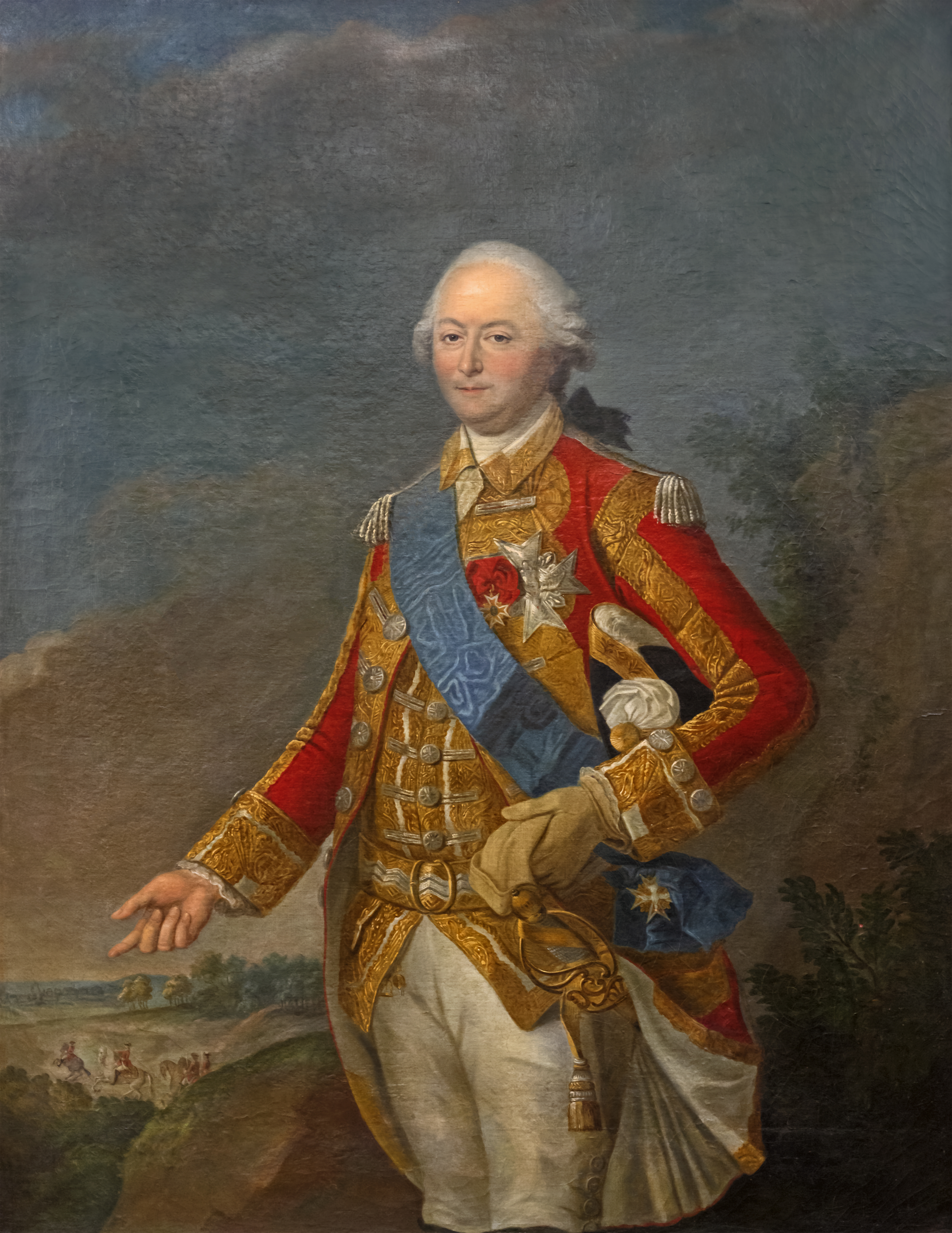
Duke of Aiguillon.

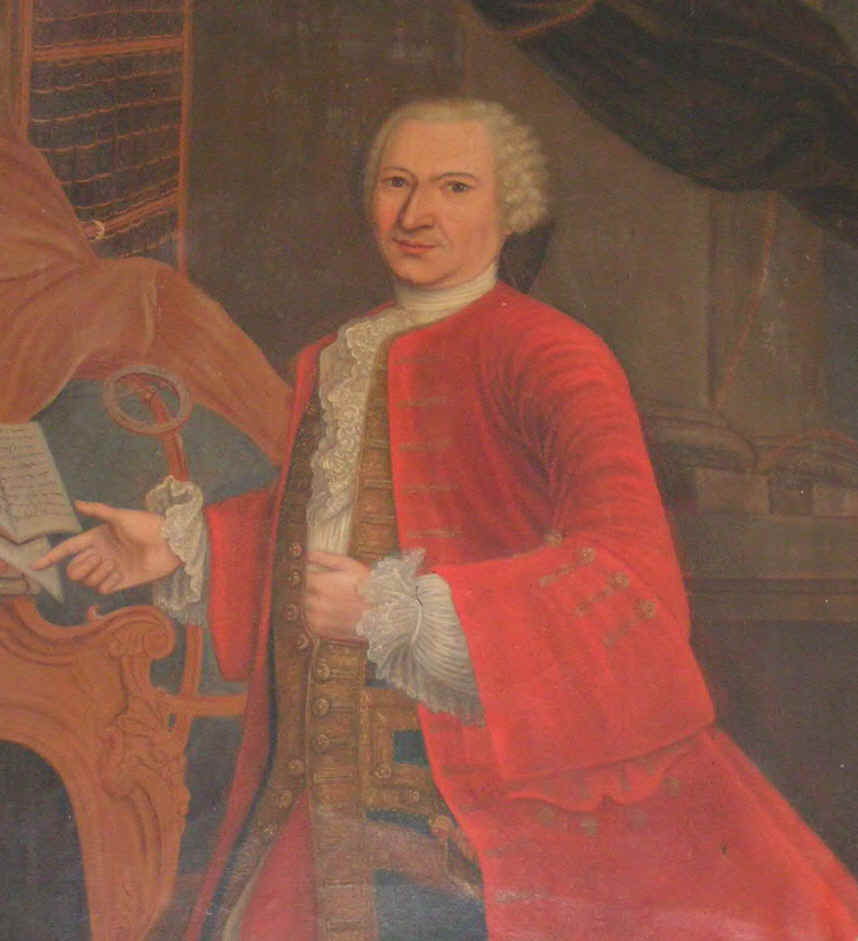
Charles de Ternay.

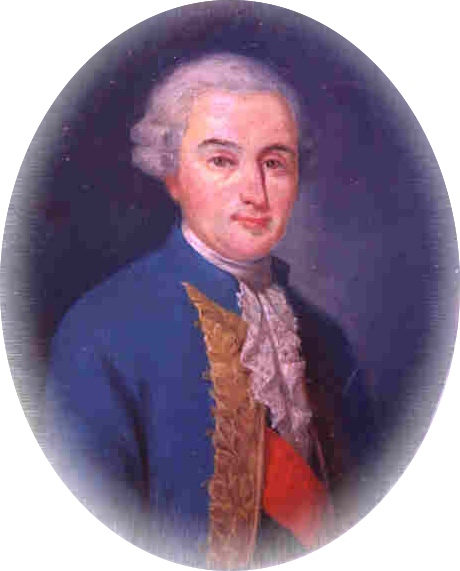
Charles Jean d'Hector.

==== British side ====
As commodore, Robert Duff commanded Admiral Hawke's light division Redspatrolled Quiberon Bay. During the Battle of the Cardinaux, he led the HMS Rochester, heading a squadron of four 50-gun ships and four frigates, which lured Conflans' ships into a confrontation with Hawke's squadron. For his actions in the battle, Duff was promoted to command the Foudroyant, an 80-gun ship captured from the French the previous year. He then participated in Rodney's campaign in the West Indies. Duff later joined the American War of Independence and rose to Admiral.

Arbuthnot's ships enforced the blockade of the Vilaine estuary. Marriot Arbuthnot led the HMS Portland, while Francis Samuel Drake commanded the HMS Falkland. Both were promoted to Admiral and Rear admiral respectively for their actions during the American War of Independence.

Key British figures (selection)

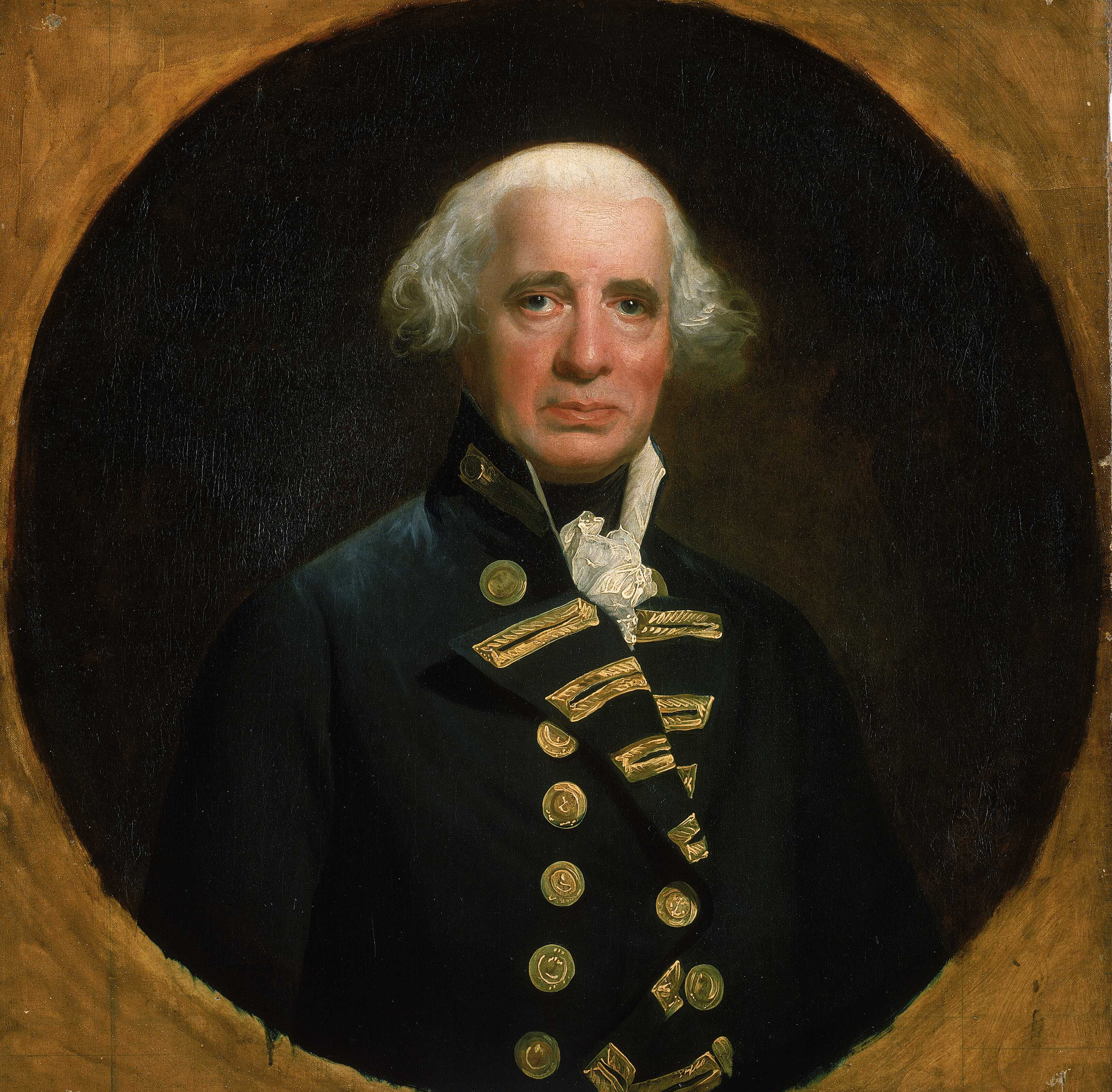
Admiral Howe of the fleet.

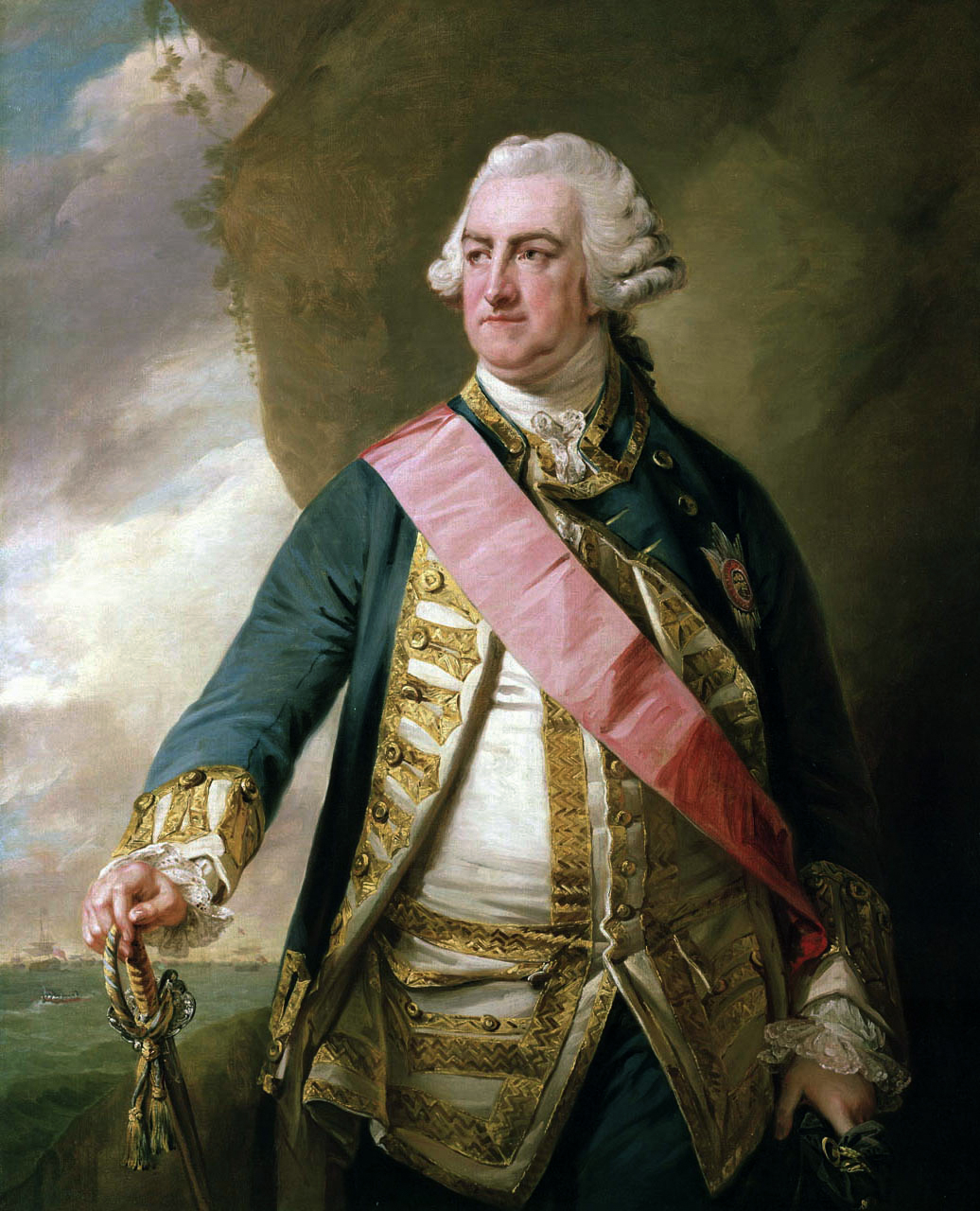
Admiral Hawke.

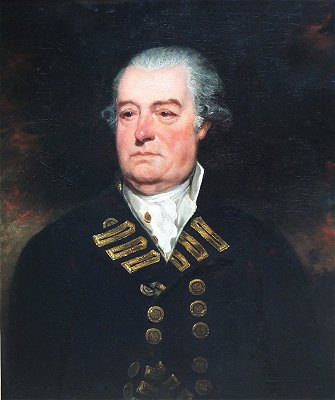
Marriot Arbuthnot.

== Local effects of the blockade ==
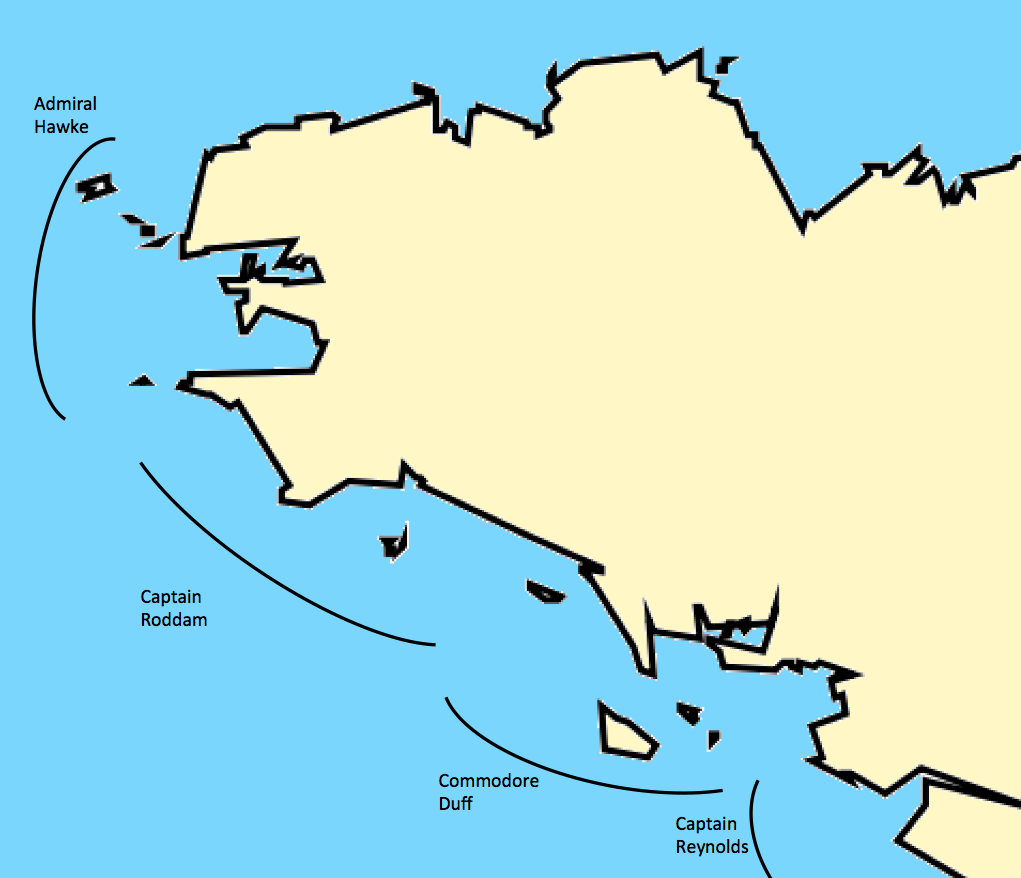
Naval blockade of Brittany during the Seven Years' War.

The Royal Navy's strategy, which began in 1755 and reached its peak in 1758 and 1759, was designed to cut off France from its colonies and their revenues, as well as to diminish its naval strength, thereby weakening it economically. The Royal Navy systematically captured fishermen, coastal vessels, colonial ships, and privateers.

Admiral Hawke was responsible for the blockade of Brittany's coast starting in May 1759. He patrolled off Ushant with approximately twenty ships. The blockade also extended beyond Brest and its port, with three additional divisions forming a tight net to the south of the Raz de Sein.

During the blockade of the Vilaine, over seven thousand French crew members spent more than two years aboard their ships. This led to the establishment of a "port officer's bureau serving the king's ships" on the quays of La Roche-Bernard, which also boosted local commercial activity to provide food for the crews.

[…] The squadron anchored in the roadstead of Vieille-Roche, two leagues from La Roche-Bernard, caused unusual activity in the region. This boosted trade. Vieille-Roche was connected to La Roche-Bernard by a boat service. […] significant markets were established to meet the needs of the Vilaine squadron. […] On February 7, 1760, an agreement was reached among the various butchers of La Roche-Bernard for supplying fresh meat to the navy troops at Vieille-Roche […]

— Viscount Oton du Hautais, Aux environs de la Roche-Bernard, 1894.

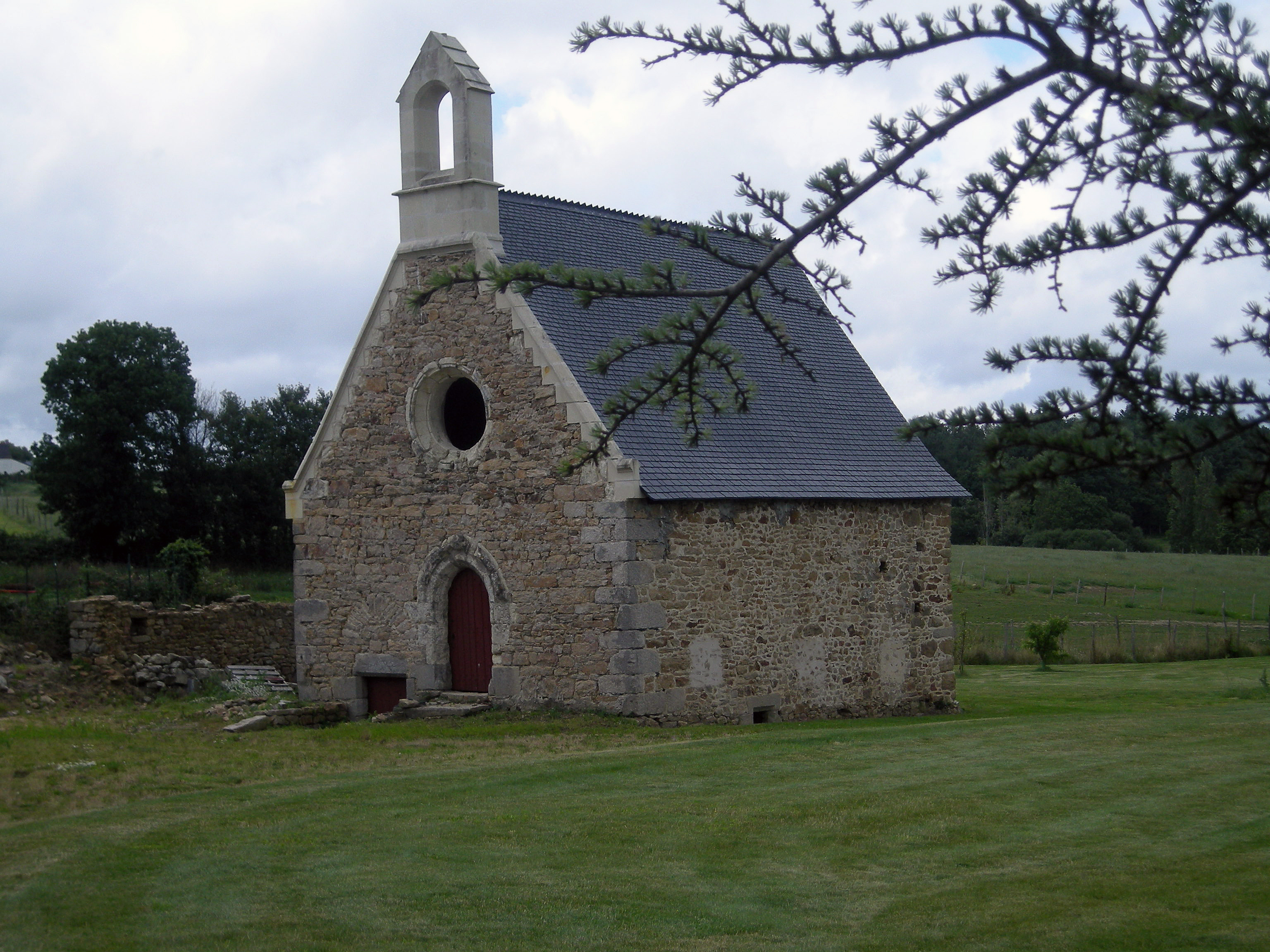
The Bavalan chapel.

The local effects of the blockade have been the subject of conflicting analyses. According to some sources, "the blockade of the Vilaine by the English fleet from 1759 to 1762 severely impacted the local economy." However, the La Roche-Bernard municipality's website highlights the positive economic impacts of having seven thousand crew members present for over two years. Oton du Hautais documented in 1894 that "[...] on February 16, 1761, Jacques Le Barz, master of the coastal trading vessel Sainte-Anne of Port-Louis, [...] received 144 livres for transporting a cable from Nantes to Vieille-Roche [...] for the service of the king's ships anchored in the Vilaine river." A similar transport occurred on February 16, 1761 (Marie-Joseph). Despite the risks involved, coastal trading activities continued during the blockade of the Vilaine.

The seigneurial chapel of Bavalan, situated in Ambon north of the Vilaine estuary, has been designated as a historic monument since December 16, 2009. The chapel showcases graffiti believed to have been created by the local community, portraying warships with rows of gun ports. These maritime graffiti, dating back to the late 18th century, (Note: The chapel walls bear older maritime graffiti, probably from the previous century.) are evidence of the prolonged presence of the blockaded squadron's crews in the Vilaine estuary.

== See also ==
=== Bibliography ===
- Pluyette, Henri (1980). Le blocus de la Vilaine 1759-1762 (in French). Arzal: Henri Pluyette.
- du Hautais, Odon (2015) [1894]. Aux environs de la Roche-Bernard : notices et essais historiques (in French). Lulu.com. ISBN 978-1-326-22003-7.
- La Condamine, Pierre (February 2004) [1982]. Le combat des Cardinaux : 20 novembre 1759, baie de Quiberon et rade du Croisic (in French). La Turballe: Éditions du Bateau qui vire. ISBN 2-911835-03-4.
- Lacour-Gayet, Georges (1902). La Marine militaire de la France sous le règne de Louis XV (in French). Paris: Honoré Champion.
- Le Moing, Guy (2011). Les Cahiers du Pays de Guérande (in French). Vol. 53. Société des Amis de Guérande. ISSN 0765-3565.
- Maisonneuve, Brigitte (2011). Les Cahiers du Pays de Guérande (in French). Vol. 53. Société des Amis de Guérande. ISSN 0765-3565.
- Mascart, Jean (2000) [1911]. La vie et les travaux du chevalier Jean-Charles de Borda, 1733-1799 : épisodes de la vie scientifique au xviiie siècle. Bibliothèque de la Revue d'histoire maritime (in French). Paris: Presses de l'université de Paris-Sorbonne. ISBN 2-84050-173-2.
- Meyer, Jean; Acerra, Martine (1994). Histoire de la marine française : des origines à nos jours (in French). Rennes: Édilarge. ISBN 2-7373-1129-2.
- Perrochon, Cécile (2011). Les Cahiers du Pays de Guérande (in French). Vol. 53. Société des Amis de Guérande. ISSN 0765-3565.
- Taillemite, Étienne (2002). Dictionnaire des marins français (in French). Paris: Tallandier.
- Vergé-Franceschi, Michel (2002). Dictionnaire d'Histoire maritime. Bouquins (in French). Paris: Éditions Robert Laffont. ISBN 2-221-08751-8.

Primary sources on the blockade of the Vilaine, including texts and graphics, are held in Vannes at the Morbihan departmental archives, in Paris at the Archives nationales and the Bibliothèque nationale de France (BnF), and in Vincennes at the Defence Historical Service (SHD).

=== Related articles ===
- Battle of Quiberon Bay
- Seven Years' War

=== External links ===
- "Le manoir de Vieille-Roche à Arzal". topic-topos.com (in French). Archived from the original on February 24, 2016.
