= French frigate Brillant (1757) =

Vessel built by Jacques-Luc Coulomb

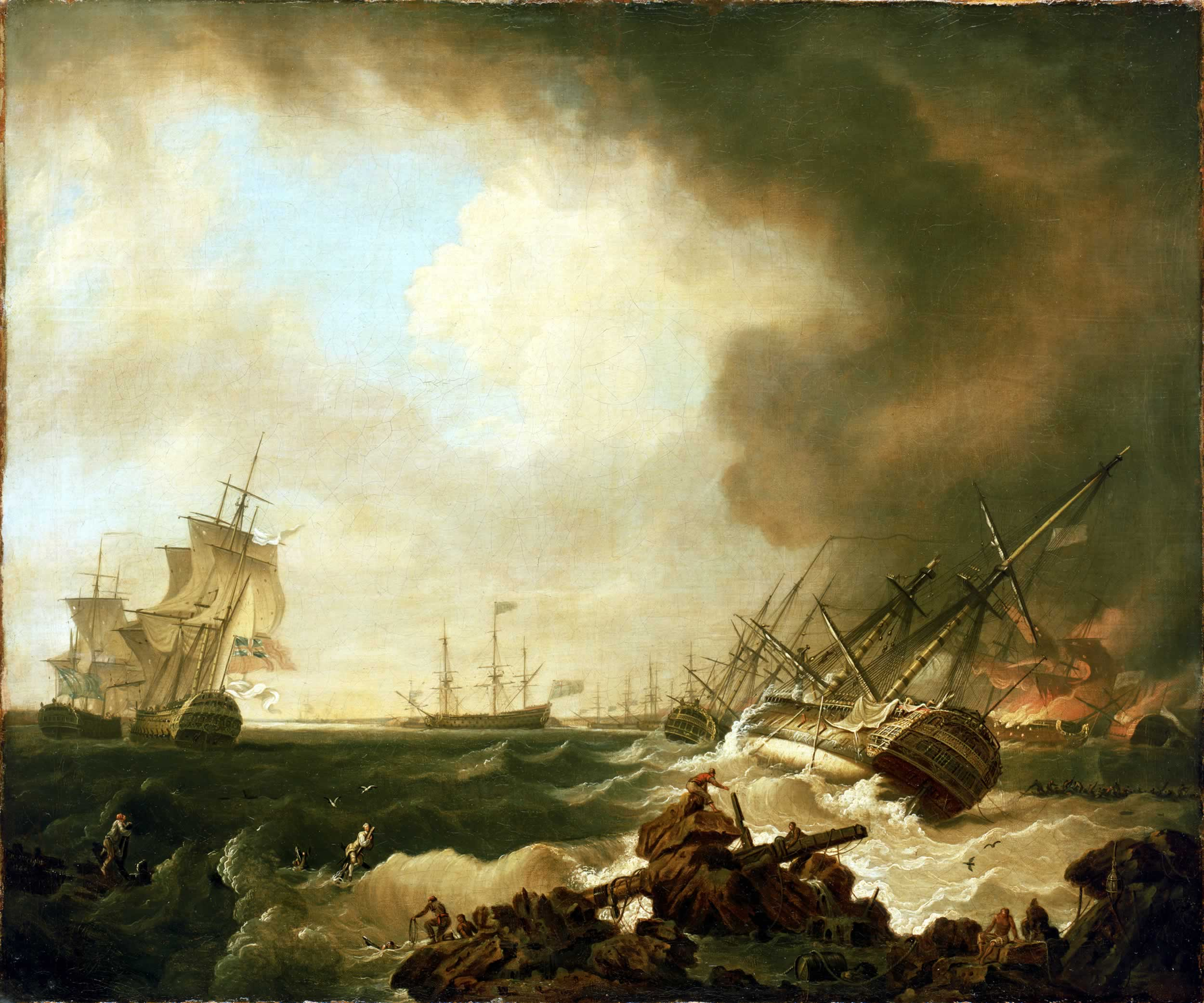
- Battle of Quiberon Bay, in which Brillant was present

History
- Laid down: April 1756
- Launched: 27 September 1757
- In service: French Royal Navy

General characteristics
- Type: Ship of the line
- Displacement: 1,250
- Length: 50.7 m (166 ft 4 in)
- Beam: 13.3 m (43 ft 8 in)
- Draft: 6.2 m (20 ft 4 in)
- Propulsion: sail
- Crew: 640 to 650 people (Note: In the 18th century, warships generally followed an average ratio of about ten crew members per gun, regardless of individual duties on board. Accordingly, a 100-gun ship typically carried around 1,000 men, an 80-gun ship about 800, a 74-gun ship 740, and a 64-gun ship 640, with officers counted separately. In practice, these official complements could vary significantly due to factors such as epidemics, combat losses, or shortages of sailors at the time of embarkation.)
- Armament: 64 cannons

Brillant was a two-deck, 64-gun vessel of the East Indiaman type, built by Jacques-Luc Coulomb for the East India Company and launched at Lorient in 1757. Acquired by the French Royal Navy in November 1758, it was converted into a second-rate ship of the line. The ship was dismantled in 1773.

The vessel was designed in accordance with French naval standards of the 1730s and 1740s, which sought to balance construction costs, maneuverability, and firepower. This approach aimed to produce moderately armed ships capable of operating effectively against the numerically superior British navy.

== Description ==
The ship was armed with twenty-six 24-pounder guns on the lower gun deck, twenty-eight 12-pounder guns on the upper gun deck, and ten 6-pounder guns distributed between the forecastle and the quarterdeck.

== History ==
In 1759, Brillant captured three privateer vessels: Marquis de Barail, Marquis de Durat, and Le Basque.

In the same year, under the command of Louis-Jean de Kerémar, it joined the fleet assembled at Brest under the authority of Marshal Hubert de Brienne de Conflans for a planned invasion of England. The ship took part in the Battle of Quiberon Bay on 20 November 1759, serving in the White and Blue Squadron, which formed the vanguard of the fleet and was commanded by Joseph de Bauffremont.

Following the French defeat, Brillant took refuge in the estuary of the Vilaine together with six other ships—Robuste, Inflexible, Glorieux, Éveillé, Dragon, and Sphinx—as well as two frigates, Vestale and Aigrette, and two corvettes, Calypso and Prince Noir. Owing to poor visibility, Glorieux and Éveillé ran aground in the mud. The grounding caused no serious damage to Éveillé, but Glorieux sustained a leak, while Inflexible lost its foremast and bowsprit.

After more than two and a half years of operations directed by the officers appointed by the Duke of Aiguillon, Charles-Henri-Louis d’Arsac de Ternay (Note: D’Arsac de Ternay was appointed captain on 10 January 1761 in reward for his efforts during the blockade.) and Charles-Jean d’Hector, (Note: D’Hector was appointed captain on 15 January 1762 for having saved the Brillant and the Éveillé during the blockade.) the ships trapped at the mouth of the Vilaine were finally extracted. On the night of 6–7 January 1761, in conditions of heavy fog followed by a violent storm, Dragon and Brillant, under the command of Ternay and d’Hector, sailed out accompanied by the frigates Vestale and Aigrette and the corvette Calypso, and reached Brest or Rochefort. Shortly afterward, Vestale was captured by HMS Unicorn on 9 January, while Aigrette successfully engaged HMS Seahorse.

In the same year, Brillant captured the privateer Curieux, armed with six guns. The ship was decommissioned at Brest in November 1770 and dismantled in 1773.

== See also ==
- History of the French Navy from 1715 to 1789
- List of ships of the line of France

== Bibliography ==
- Acerra, Martine; Zysberg, André (1997). L'essor des marines de guerre européennes : vers 1680-1790 [The rise of European navies: circa 1680–1790]. Regards sur l'histoire (in French). Paris: SEDES. ISBN 2-7181-9515-0.
- Lacour-Gayet, Georges (1910). La Marine militaire de la France sous le règne de Louis XV [The French Navy under the reign of Louis XV] (in French). Paris: Honoré Champion éditeur.
- Lacour-Gayet, Georges (1905). La Marine militaire de la France sous le règne de Louis XV [The French Navy under the reign of Louis XV] (in French). Paris: Honoré Champion éditeur.
- Mascart, Jean (2000). La vie et les travaux du chevalier Jean-Charles de Borda, 1733-1799 : épisodes de la vie scientifique au XVIIIe siècle [The Life and Works of Chevalier Jean-Charles de Borda, 1733-1799: Episodes from Scientific Life in the 18th Century]. Bibliothèque de la Revue d'histoire maritime (in French). Paris: Presses de l'université de Paris-Sorbonne. ISBN 2-84050-173-2.
- Meyer, Jean; Acerra, Martine (1994). Histoire de la marine française : des origines à nos jours [History of the French Navy: from its origins to the present day] (in French). Rennes: Ouest-France. ISBN 2-7373-1129-2.
- Perrochon, Cécile (2011). "La bataille des Cardinaux et le blocus de la Vilaine" [The Battle of the Cardinals and the Blockade of the Vilaine]. Les Cahiers du Pays de Guérande (in French). Société des Amis de Guérande. ISSN 0765-3565.
- Roche, Jean-Michel (2005). Dictionnaire des bâtiments de la flotte de guerre française de Colbert à nos jours [Dictionary of French Navy ships from Colbert to the present day] (PDF) (in French). Vol. 1. Toulon: J.-M. Roche. ISBN 978-2-9525917-0-6.
- Troude, Onésime (1868). Batailles navales de la France [Naval battles of France] (in French). Paris: Challamel aîné.
- Vergé-Franceschi, Michel (2002). Dictionnaire d'histoire maritime [Dictionary of Maritime History]. Bouquins (in French). Paris: éditions Robert Laffont. ISBN 2-221-08751-8.
- Villiers, Patrick (2015). La France sur mer : de Louis XIII à Napoléon Ier [France at sea: from Louis XIII to Napoleon I]. Pluriel (in French). Paris: Fayard. ISBN 978-2-8185-0437-6.
- Villiers, Patrick; Duteil, Jean-Pierre; Muchembled, Robert (1997). L'Europe, la mer et les colonies : XVIIe-XVIIIe siècle [Europe, the sea, and the colonies: 17th-18th centuries]. Carré Histoire (in French). Paris: Hachette supérieur. ISBN 2-01-145196-5.
