= French corvette Calypso =

French corvette built in 1756

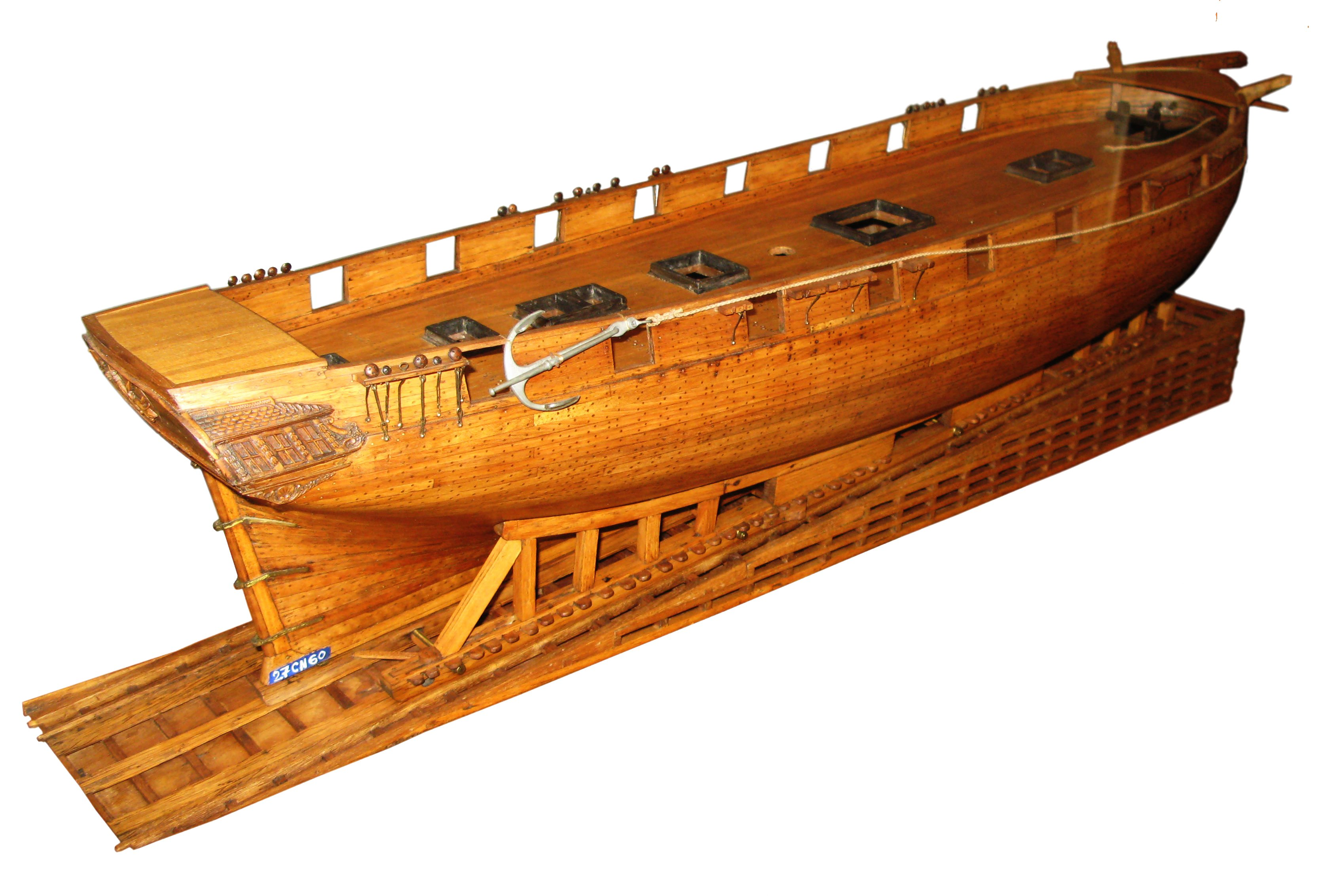
- Scale model of a 16-gun corvette ready to be launched, similar in type to the Calypso

History

France
- Name: Calypso
- Laid down: June 1756
- Launched: September 1756
- Commissioned: November 1756

General characteristics
- Type: Corvette
- Displacement: 400 t
- Length: 32.5 m (106 ft 8 in)
- Beam: 8.1 m (26 ft 7 in)
- Draft: 4.0 m (13 ft 1 in)
- Armament: 16 × 4-pounder cannons

Calypso was a corvette built in 1756 at Brest and served in the French Royal Navy from 1756 to 1763.

== History ==
In 1759, Calypso, commanded by Ensign Paul Alexandre du Bois-Berthelot, was part of the squadron of 21 ships assembled at Brest under Marshal of France Hubert de Brienne de Conflans for a planned landing in England. She took part in the Battle of the Cardinaux on 20 November 1759.

After the French defeat, Calypso took refuge in the estuary of the Vilaine along with six other ships—Brillant, Robuste, Inflexible, Glorieux, Éveillé, Dragon, and Sphinx—accompanied by the frigates Vestale and Aigrette and the corvette Prince Noir. Due to poor visibility, Glorieux and Éveillé ran aground; the Éveillé was not seriously damaged, while the Glorieux suffered a leak, and the Inflexible lost its foremast and bowsprit.

It took more than two and a half years for the officers appointed by the Duke of Aiguillon, Charles-Henri-Louis d’Arsac de Ternay (Note: D’Arsac de Ternay was appointed captain on 10 January 1761 as a reward for his efforts during the blockade.) and Charles Jean d’Hector, (Note: D’Hector was appointed captain on 15 January 1762 for having saved the Brillant and the Éveillé during the blockade.) to free the ships from the mouth of the Vilaine. During the night of 6–7 January 1761, in heavy fog and amid a storm, the Dragon and Brillant, under the command of Ternay and d’Hector, followed by the Vestale, Aigrette, and Calypso, reached Brest or Rochefort. The frigate Vestale was recaptured on 9 January by HMS Unicorn, while the Aigrette engaged HMS Seahorse. Calypso reached Brest but was involved in combat during the voyage, and her captain, Ensign Desforges, died upon arrival.

In August 1763, the vessel was converted into a three-masted xebec.

== See also ==
- History of the French Navy from 1715 to 1789
- List of ships of the line of France

== Bibliography ==
- Acerra, Martine; Zysberg, André (1997). L'essor des marines de guerre européennes : vers 1680-1790 [The rise of European navies: circa 1680–1790]. Regards sur l'histoire (in French). Paris: SEDES. ISBN 2-7181-9515-0.
- Lacour-Gayet, Georges (1910). La Marine militaire de la France sous le règne de Louis XV [The French Navy under the reign of Louis XV] (in French). Paris: Honoré Champion éditeur.
- Lacour-Gayet, Georges (1905). La marine militaire de France sous le règne de Louis XVI [The French Navy under the reign of Louis XVI] (in French). Paris: Honoré Champion éditeur.
- Le Moing, Guy (2003). La Bataille navale des « Cardinaux » : 20 novembre 1759 [The Naval Battle of the “Cardinals”: November 20, 1759]. Campagnes et stratégies (in French). Paris: Economica. ISBN 2-7178-4503-8.
- Le Moing, Guy (2011). Les 600 plus grandes batailles navales de l'histoire [The 600 greatest naval battles in history] (in French). Rennes: Marines éditions. ISBN 978-2-35743-077-8.
- Mascart, Jean (2000). La vie et les travaux du chevalier Jean-Charles de Borda, 1733-1799 : épisodes de la vie scientifique au XVIIIe siècle [The Life and Works of Chevalier Jean-Charles de Borda, 1733-1799: Episodes from Scientific Life in the 18th Century]. Bibliothèque de la Revue d'histoire maritime (in French). Paris: Presses de l'université de Paris-Sorbonne. ISBN 2-84050-173-2.
- Meyer, Jean; Acerra, Martine (1994). Histoire de la marine française : des origines à nos jours [History of the French Navy: from its origins to the present day] (in French). Rennes: Ouest-France. ISBN 2-7373-1129-2.
- Perrochon, Cécile (2011). "La bataille des Cardinaux et le blocus de la Vilaine" [The Battle of the Cardinals and the Blockade of the Vilaine]. Les Cahiers du Pays de Guérande (in French). Société des Amis de Guérande. ISSN 0765-3565.
- Roche, Jean-Michel (2005). Dictionnaire des bâtiments de la flotte de guerre française de Colbert à nos jours [Dictionary of French Navy ships from Colbert to the present day] (PDF) (in French). Vol. 1. Toulon: J.-M. Roche. ISBN 978-2-9525917-0-6.
- Troude, Onésime (1868). Batailles navales de la France [Naval battles of France] (in French). Paris: Challamel aîné.
- Vergé-Franceschi, Michel (2002). Dictionnaire d'histoire maritime [Dictionary of Maritime History]. Bouquins (in French). Paris: éditions Robert Laffont. ISBN 2-221-08751-8.
- Villiers, Patrick (2015). La France sur mer : de Louis XIII à Napoléon Ier [France at sea: from Louis XIII to Napoleon I]. Pluriel (in French). Paris: Fayard. ISBN 978-2-8185-0437-6.
- Villiers, Patrick; Duteil, Pierre; Muchembled, Robert (1997). L'Europe, la mer et les colonies : XVIIe-XVIIIe siècle [Europe, the sea, and the colonies: 17th-18th centuries]. Carré Histoire (in French). Paris: Hachette supérieur. ISBN 2-01-145196-5.
