= Jean-Baptiste Mac Nemara =

French Navy officer of Irish origin

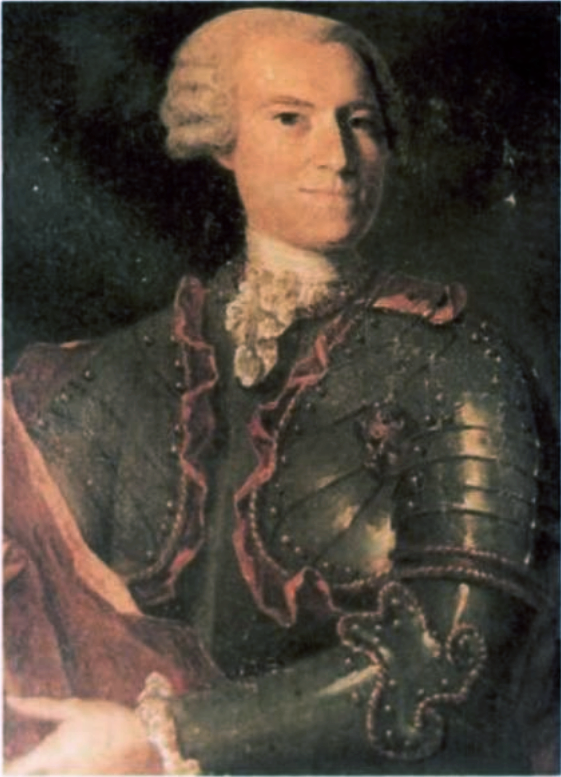
- Born: c. 1690
- Died: 18 October 1756; Rochefort
- Spouse(s): Julienne Stapleton; Marie-Catherine Larcher
- Military career
- Branch: French Navy
- Rank: vice-admiral
- Conflicts: action of 8 June 1755

Jean-Baptiste Mac Nemara, baron du Mung, seigneur de la Rochecourbon, Tourfou, Moullet et autres lieux (c. 1690 – 18 October 1756 in Rochefort) was a French Navy officer of Irish origin.

== Biography ==
=== Origins ===
Mac Nemara was born to Catherine Saint-Jean and to Jean Mac Nemara, an Irish nobleman and jacobite refugee who had fled to Lorient. His brother, Claude Matthieu Mac Nemara, had a career in the French Navy, rising to captain and to Knight in the Order of Saint-Louis.

In 1713, Jean-Baptiste Mac Nemara married Julienne Stapleton in the chapel of château des Dervallières in Nantes. Stapleton was an heir to Jean Ier Stapleton, an Irish of Nantes, who had a plantation in Saint-Domingue.

After Stapleton died in 1748, Mac Nemara married Marie-Catherine Larcher on 25 August 1754 at Mung. Larcher was the widow of André Martin de Poinsable, former governor of Martinique. Her granddaughter Julie Catherine de Turpin de Jouhé would later marry Nicolas Henri de Grimouard on 1 December 1779 in Rochefort.

=== Naval career ===
A protégé of Duke de Bourbon, Mac Nemara joined the Navy as a garde-marine on 5 April 1707. In 1710 he served on Atalante under Du Clerc in an expedition against Rio de Janeiro. Wounded and taken prisoner on 19 September 1710, he was freed after two years and promoted to frigate lieutenant on 25 November 1713. In 1713, when he married, Mac Nemara served as an ensign in a company of the Navy and was commissary for food at Rochefort arsenal.

Mac Nemara was promoted to enseigne de port on 16 October 1721. He took part in several campaigns in the Caribbean in 1727–1728, 1730–1731, 1739–1740, 1741-1742 and 1744, earning a promotion to aide-major in November 1723 and lieutenant in 1734.

Head of the Gardes-marines in Rochefort from 1 April 1745, he also led a division in the Caribbean, fighting against FitzRoy Henry Lee and returning to France in 1746. In April 1748, he was promoted to Chef d'escadre, and in 1750 he was appointed to the first Escadre d'évolution. In September 1752, he was promoted to lieutenant général des armées navales, aged 62.

Mac Nemara was the commanding officer of the Navy in Rochefort from 1751 to 1756. In 1756, he headed a 6-ship and 3-frigate squadron to bring reinforcements to Emmanuel Auguste Dubois de La Motte in New France (now Canada), comprising the ships Formidable, Héros, Palmier, Éveillé, Inflexible and Aigle, and the frigates Améthyste, Sirène and Héroïne, and fought in the action of 8 June 1755.

On 17 October 1756, Mac Nemara was made a Vice-Admiral and chief of the flotte du Ponant. He died the following day. Hubert de Brienne replaced him.

== Recent bibliography ==
- Clarke de Dromantin, Patrick (2005). Les réfugiés jacobites dans la France du XVIIIe siècle (in French). Presses universitaires de Bordeaux. ISBN 2-86781-362-X.
- Meyer, Jean; Acerra, Martine (1994). Histoire de la marine française : des origines à nos jours. Rennes: Ouest-France. ISBN 2-7373-1129-2.
- Monaque, Rémi (2016). Une histoire de la marine de guerre française (in French). Paris: éditions Perrin. ISBN 978-2-262-03715-4.
- Roussel, Claude-Youenn; Forrer, Claude (2019). Tromelin et Suffren, un conflit entre marins. Kronos. ISBN 978-2-917232-88-0.
- Taillemite, Étienne (2002). Dictionnaire des marins français (in French). Paris: éditions Tallandier. ISBN 2-84734-008-4.
- Vergé-Franceschi, Michel (2002). Dictionnaire d'histoire maritime. Bouquins (in French). Paris: éditions Robert Laffont. ISBN 2-221-08751-8.
- Vergé-Franceschi, Michel (1996). La Marine française au XVIIIe siècle. Regards sur l'histoire (in French). Paris: SEDES. ISBN 2-7181-9503-7.

== Older bibliography ==
- Troude, Onésime (1867–1868). Batailles navales de la France (in French). Paris: Challamel aîné. p. 453.
- La Roncière, Charles (1932). Histoire de la Marine française (in French). Paris: Plon. p. 674.
- Lacour-Gayet, Georges (1910) [1902]. La Marine militaire de la France sous le règne de Louis XV (in French) (revue et augmentée ed.). Honoré Champion éditeur.
