= French ship Inflexible (1752) =

French ship launched in 1752

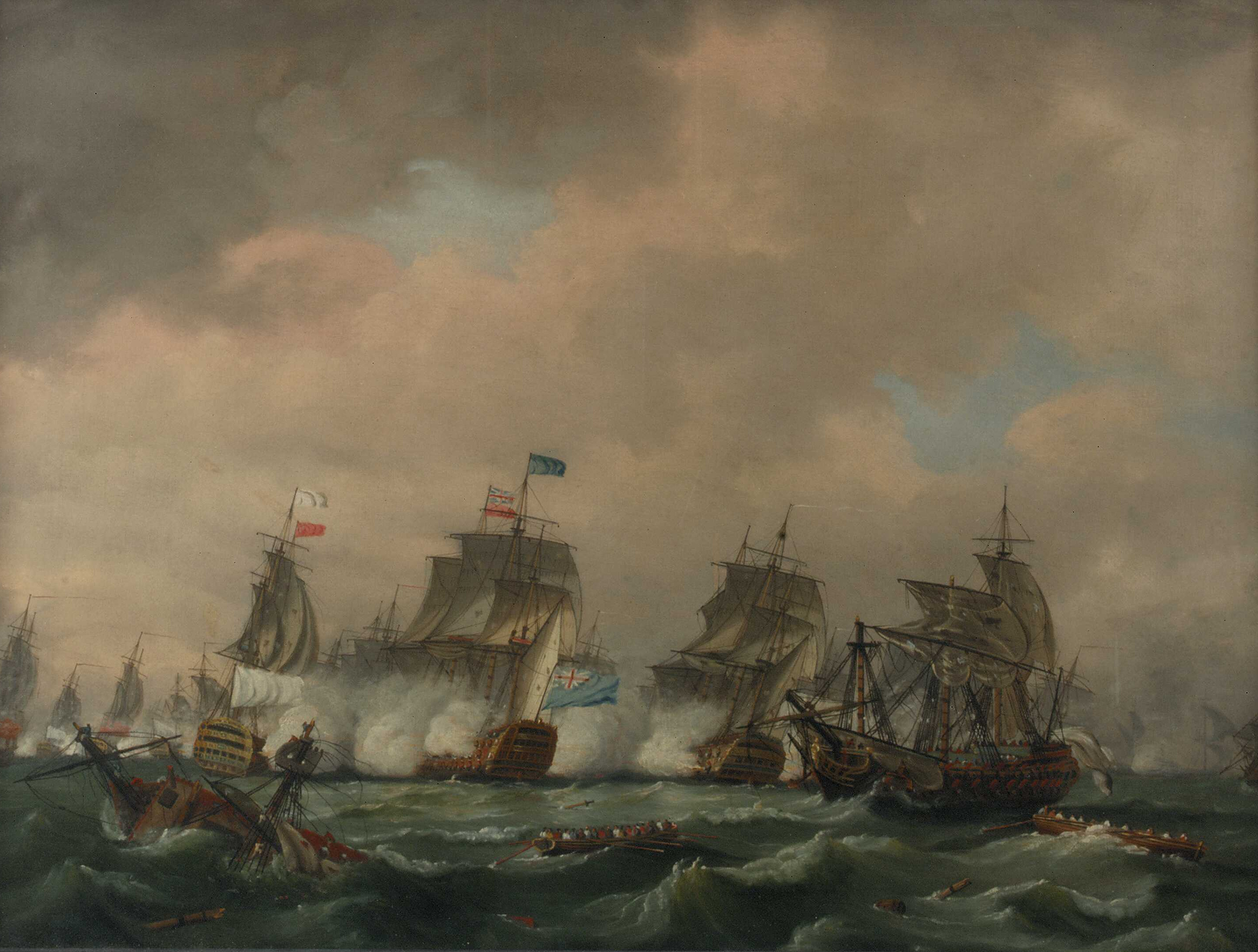
- The Battle of Quiberon Bay, in which the Inflexible took part, and which indirectly led to its downfall.

History
- Name: Inflexible
- Launched: 1752

General characteristics
- Type: Ship of the line
- Displacement: 2100 tonneaux
- Tons burthen: 1100 port tonneaux
- Length: 45.11 m
- Beam: 12.37 m
- Draft: 6.37 m
- Propulsion: Sailing
- Capacity: 620 to 650 people (Note: The typical ratio on all types of warships in the 18th century was approximately 10 men per cannon, regardless of each one's role aboard. Thus, a 100-gun ship carried 1,000 men, an 80-gun ship 800 men, a 74-gun ship 740, a 64-gun ship 640, etc. The officers were in addition. However, this standard crew size could vary considerably in the event of an epidemic, combat losses, or a shortage of sailors at the time of boarding.)
- Armament: 64 canons

Inflexible was a 64-gun ship constructed by Pierre Morineau between 1751 and 1755 and launched from Rochefort in 1752. It was constructed during the period of shipbuilding between the conclusion of the War of Austrian Succession (1748) and the commencement of the Seven Years' War (1755). The ship participated in many missions during this conflict and was lost at sea in 1760 following its involvement in the Battle of Quiberon Bay.

== Main characteristics ==
Inflexible was a medium-armed vessel constructed by the standards established by French shipbuilders in the 1730s and 1740s. These standards were designed to achieve an optimal balance between cost, maneuverability, and firepower, to maintain a competitive edge against the English navy, which possessed a significantly larger number of ships. It was categorized as a "64-gun" ship, the inaugural vessel of which was launched in 1735, followed by numerous others until the late 1770s. However, these ships were ultimately superseded by those designated as "74-gun (Note: The 74-gun ships were a technical extension of the 64-gun design, appearing nine years after the launch of the first 64-gun ship, Borée. For a chronology of launches and ship series, see also the list of ships of the line of France.)" vessels.

Under the prevailing naval construction techniques of the period, the vessel's hull was crafted from oak, its rigging from pine, and its sails and ropes from hemp. In comparison to 74-gun ships, this vessel was less powerful due to the combination of a reduced number of guns and a smaller caliber of artillery. The first gun deck was equipped with twenty-six 24-pound cannons, arranged in thirteen gun ports, while the second gun deck had twenty-eight 12-pound cannons, distributed across fourteen ports. Additionally, the upper decks were fitted with ten 6-pound cannons. This artillery configuration was typical for a 64-gun ship. The cannons were made of iron, with a reserve of approximately 50 to 60 cannonballs, exclusive of chain shots and grapeshot.

== History ==
Plan of the Battle of Quiberon Bay, with the dislocation of the French squadron and the escape of some of the ships to the Vilaine River. Inflexible is one of them.

Inflexible commenced its operational career at the outset of the Seven Years' War. The vessel's inaugural captain was Monsieur de Guébriant. It was incorporated into a modest squadron of six ships and three frigates under the direction of Lieutenant General Macnemara, whose responsibility was to provide security for 18 vessels transporting reinforcements to Canada, under the command of Dubois de La Motte. Macnemara was instructed to avoid unnecessary risks when confronting the English forces. Consequently, he cruised along the coastline before returning (May 3–May 20, 1755), leaving Dubois de La Motte to complete the mission independently. With Macnemara falling ill and resigning, Inflexible remained under the same command but was reassigned to Du Gay, who patrolled the waters near Brest to safeguard incoming trade convoys.

In 1757, Inflexible was placed under the command of Captain de Tilly and was incorporated into a division of five ships and a frigate under the command of Squadron Commander Bauffremont. The objective of this division was to sail to the West Indies and North America to defend the sugar islands and Louisbourg. On January 31, the vessel set sail from Brest for Saint-Domingue, where it arrived a few weeks later with the other ships, having disembarked troops. Subsequently, the vessel proceeded to Canada, arriving in May. This enabled it to participate in the substantial naval concentration that prevented the invasion of Louisbourg that year. In October, Inflexible departed from the area and returned to France. Like other vessels, it was affected by the severe typhus epidemic that devastated the crews and spread to Brest upon its arrival in November, resulting in the deaths of thousands in the city. During this campaign, the death of Captain de Tilly resulted in the ship being placed under the command of Monsieur de Saint-Laurent.

As was the case with the majority of the Brest fleet, Inflexible remained docked in 1758 to reorganize its crew, which had been disordered by the epidemic of the previous year, and of preparing for the 1759 campaign, which the government hoped would prove decisive, given that a landing in England was planned. Inflexible was mobilized under the command of Chevalier de Caumont to serve in the rear guard of the 21-ship squadron under Conflans, which was tasked with escorting the invasion fleet. On November 20, 1759, the ship participated in the unsuccessful Battle of Quiberon Bay, where it played a relatively minor role. Following this defeat, it sought refuge in the Vilaine River with six other vessels, where it was blockaded by the English fleet.

To evade an assault by the Navy's fireships, Inflexible was stripped of its artillery and heavy equipment, thereby enabling it to navigate as far upstream in the Vilaine estuary as possible. However, on January 1, 1760, a storm arose, resulting in the shipwreck of Inflexible. The vessel was wrecked "breaking on a rock," necessitating the dismantling of the ship to salvage whatever could be saved. Inflexible is one of 37 ships lost by France during the Seven Years' War. (Note: 18 ships were captured by the enemy; 19 ships were burned or lost due to shipwrecks.) Its wreck now lies beneath the waters of the Arzal dam.

== See also ==
- New France
- Kingdom of France
- List of ships of the line of France

== Bibliography ==
- Acerra, Martine; Zysberg, André (1997). L'essor des marines de guerre européennes: vers 1680-1790. Regards sur l'histoire (no 119) (in French). Paris: SEDES. ISBN 2-7181-9515-0.
- Lacour-Gayet, Georges (1910). La Marine militaire de la France sous le règne de Louis XV (in French). Honoré Champion. Archived from the original on November 26, 2024.
- Meyer, Jean; Acerra, Martine (1994). Histoire de la marine française: des origines à nos jours (in French). Rennes: Ouest-France. ISBN 2-7373-1129-2.
- Roche, Jean-Michel (2005). Dictionnaire des bâtiments de la flotte de guerre française de Colbert à nos jours (PDF) (in French). Vol. 1. Éditions LTP.
- Troude, Onésime (1868). Batailles navales de la France (in French). Vol. 1. Paris: Challamel aîné. Archived from the original on January 19, 2025.
- Taillemite, Étienne (2002). Dictionnaire des marins français. Dictionnaires (in French). Paris: Éditions Tallandier. ISBN 978-2-84734-008-2.
- Vergé-Franceschi, Michel (2002). Dictionnaire d'Histoire maritime. Bouquins (in French). Éditions Robert Laffont.
- Villiers, Patrick (2015). La France sur mer: De Louis XIII à Napoléon Ier. Pluriel (in French). Paris: Fayard. ISBN 978-2-8185-0437-6.
- Perrochon, Cécile (2011). Les Cahiers du Pays de Guérande (in French). Vol. 53. Société des Amis de Guérande. ISSN 0765-3565.
