= Arzal dam =

Estuarine dam on the Vilaine River in Brittany, France

Arzal Dam
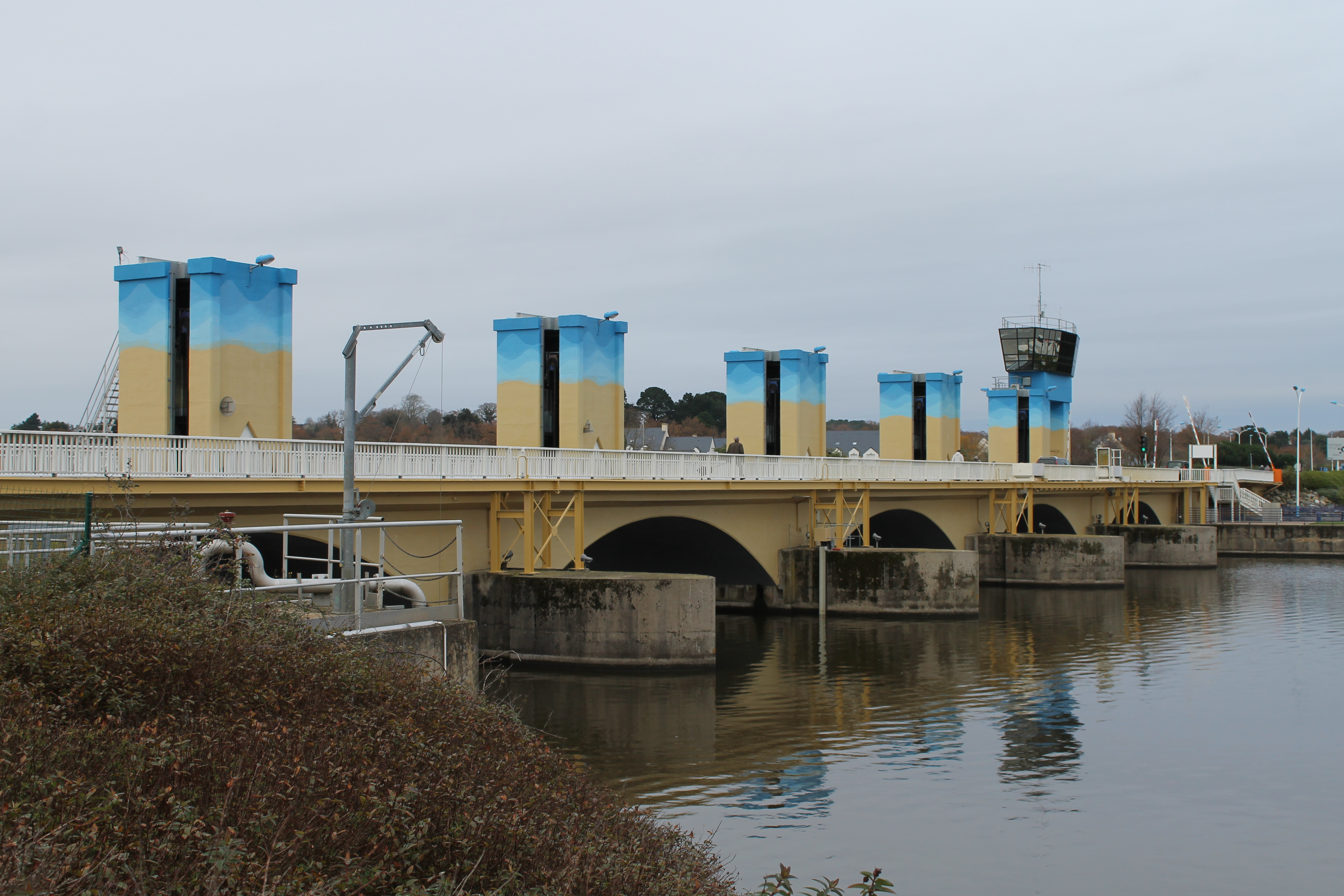
- Interactive map of Arzal Dam
- Official name: Barrage d'Arzal
- Country: France
- Coordinates: 47.499722°N 2.382222°W
- Purpose: Flood control Drinking water reserve
- Construction began: 1962
- Opening date: 1970

Dam and spillways
- Impounds: Vilaine
- Length: ~500
- Dam volume: 20 million cubic meters

The Arzal dam (or Arzal-Camoël dam) is a dam on the Vilaine estuary, situated between the communes of Arzal and Camoël in Morbihan, France. Commissioned in 1970, its primary functions are to regulate the Vilaine's flow and provide drinking water to the region spanning Saint-Nazaire, Auray, and Rennes. It stands as Europe's largest estuarine dam designed to store raw potable freshwater and is one of the few such structures globally.

== Location ==
The Arzal dam is located about ten kilometers upstream from the Vilaine's mouth at the Atlantic Ocean, between the towns of Arzal (on the right bank) and Camoël (on the left bank). It crosses the river near a former ferry passage at the site known as La Vieille-Roche.

== Description ==
Approximately 500 metres (1,600 ft) long, the structure is a gravity dam constructed from earthen embankments and rockfill. It consists of a 360 metres (1,180 ft)-long, 20 metres (66 ft)-wide embankment on the Camoël side, a lock with a movable bridge for recreational boating, five 18 metres (59 ft)-wide sluice gates equipped with guillotine-style segment valves, three fish ladders, and a control tower. A marina and a drinking water treatment plant (originally named Usine du Drézet, now renamed Usine d'eau potable interdépartementale Vilaine-Atlantique) are also located nearby.

== History ==
Redon lies downstream in the Vilaine drainage basin. The town recorded 35 overflow floods between 1900 and 2014.

The idea of building a dam on the Vilaine emerged in the 1930s following devastating floods in 1926 and 1936. Its main goals were to combat winter floods worsened by high tides, which threatened Redon, to improve regional connectivity by enhancing commercial navigation, and to reclaim agricultural land by desalinating wetlands to support intensive farming. Delayed by World War II, the project resurfaced in the 1950s. In 1961, the Institution d'aménagement de la Vilaine (IAV) was established by the departments of Morbihan, Ille-et-Vilaine, and Loire-Atlantique to oversee essential infrastructure projects.

A secondary objective later emerged: utilizing the stored freshwater for a drinking water plant about two kilometers upstream in the commune of Férel. The 17 million cubic meters treated annually serve over one million people: 70% in the Guérande Peninsula (where tourism has boomed), 25% in Morbihan, and the remainder in southeastern Ille-et-Vilaine, particularly Redon.

In 1982, Loire-Atlantique's general council revived the Route Bleue project to link Brittany with southwestern France via the Saint-Nazaire bridge over the Loire, but structural instability led to its abandonment.

Built on a 30 metres (98 ft)-deep layer of mud, the embankment sinks about fifty centimeters every decade, necessitating periodic raising works.

Construction of an anti-salinity lock is slated to begin in 2024.

== Impacts ==
The dam exemplifies a heavy-handed project implemented without consultation, with socioeconomic consequences underestimated by its proponents. It has sparked new competition for the estuarine environment's use and exploitation, both upstream and downstream and ecological effects extending beyond the local scale. In the 1980s, the dam's water releases were linked to pollution outbreaks (blooms of toxic phytoplankton, mass fish and crustacean deaths), sparking debates among research bodies. Consensus holds that itdrastically altered the Vilaine's fluvio-estuarine system. Originally designed to shield Redon from high tides, the dam was meant to stay mostly open. Yet, from 1972, it became a freshwater reserve for the coastal region from the Guérande Peninsula to the Gulf of Morbihan, supported by a major regional drinking water plant. Consequently, kept closed most of the time, it prevented currents from flushing the system. It hastened marine-derived siltation downstream by disrupting the Vilaine's hydrological cycle and the ocean current ascending the river. Between 1960 and the early 1990s, downstream estuarine infilling reached about 16 million tonnes of silt, causing meandering of the navigation channel. Minor instabilities in channel and mudflat morphology later (1990–2003) arose from floods and storms. Estuarine siltation averages 2.5 metres (8 ft 2 in), peaking in the mid-1990s. Though tasked with desilting, the IAV's limited resources, especially financial, long prevented it from meeting these duties. The river falls under the Vilaine Estuary Committee, formed in 2000 by the Vilaine SAGE Local Water Commission, after the EPTB Vilaine (formerly IAV) lost this role. In 2006, it deployed the "Rochevilaine" roto-desilter for winter dredging, with summer operations allowed exceptionally.

Traditional fishing suffered from the dam's construction, notably the catch of glass eels, once abundant in the Vilaine, and mussel farming, impacted by estuarine desalination from occasional releases.

For migratory fish, the dam hinders glass eels during their anadromous phase (increasing catchability or blocking migration entirely) and sub-adults in their sedentary phase during trophic movements, though a broader European decline in European eels has been noted since the 1980s. Late 1980s proposals to aid fish migration, especially glass eels, included better gate and lock management and/or installing fish passes. Upstream recreational and boating use has three consequences: shoreline "sprawl" from camping; growing demand for lock openings at Arzal, a hotspot for boater congestion; and the need to reposition the freshwater intake near the dam, necessitating reduced openings (shifted upstream).

== See also ==
- Estuarine Diama Dam
- Vilaine
- Arzal
- Camoël
- Morbihan
