= Dragon (1747) =

French 64-gun ship of the line (1747)

The Dragon was a two-deck ship of the line carrying 64 guns, built by Jacques-Luc Coulomb and launched at Brest in 1747. It was heavily used during the Seven Years' War. It took part in a supply mission to Canada, the Battle of Quiberon Bay, and the attempt to relieve the besieged Martinique. Its career ended in 1762, shortly before the end of the conflict.

== Main characteristics ==
The Dragon was a moderately armed vessel laid down according to the standards defined in the 1730s–1740s by French shipbuilders to achieve a good balance between cost, maneuverability, and armament, enabling them to compete with the larger British fleet. It belonged to the category of so-called 64-gun ships, whose first example was launched in 1735 and which would be followed by several dozen others until the late 1770s, when they were definitively outclassed by 74-gun ships.

Its hull was made of oak, its rigging of pine, and its sails and ropes of hemp. It was less powerful than 74-gun ships because it carried fewer guns and partly lighter calibers, name:

- Twenty-six 24-pounder long guns on the lower gun deck (13 gunports)
- Twenty-eight 12-pounder long guns on the upper gun deck (14 gunports)
- Ten 6-pounder guns on the quarterdeck and forecastle.

This artillery corresponded to the standard armament of 64-gun ships. When firing, it could deliver a broadside weighing 540 pounds (approximately 265 kilograms (584 lb)), and double that if firing from both sides simultaneously. Each gun had a reserve of about 50 to 60 cannonballs, not including bar shot and grapeshot.

To supply the hundreds of men making up its crew, it also served as a large transport vessel, requiring two to three months’ autonomy in fresh water and five to six months for food. It thus carried dozens of tons of water, wine, oil, vinegar, flour, biscuit, cheese, salted meat and fish, dried fruits and vegetables, condiments, and even live livestock intended to be slaughtered as the campaign progressed.

== Dragon in the Seven Years' War ==
=== Supplying French Canada ===
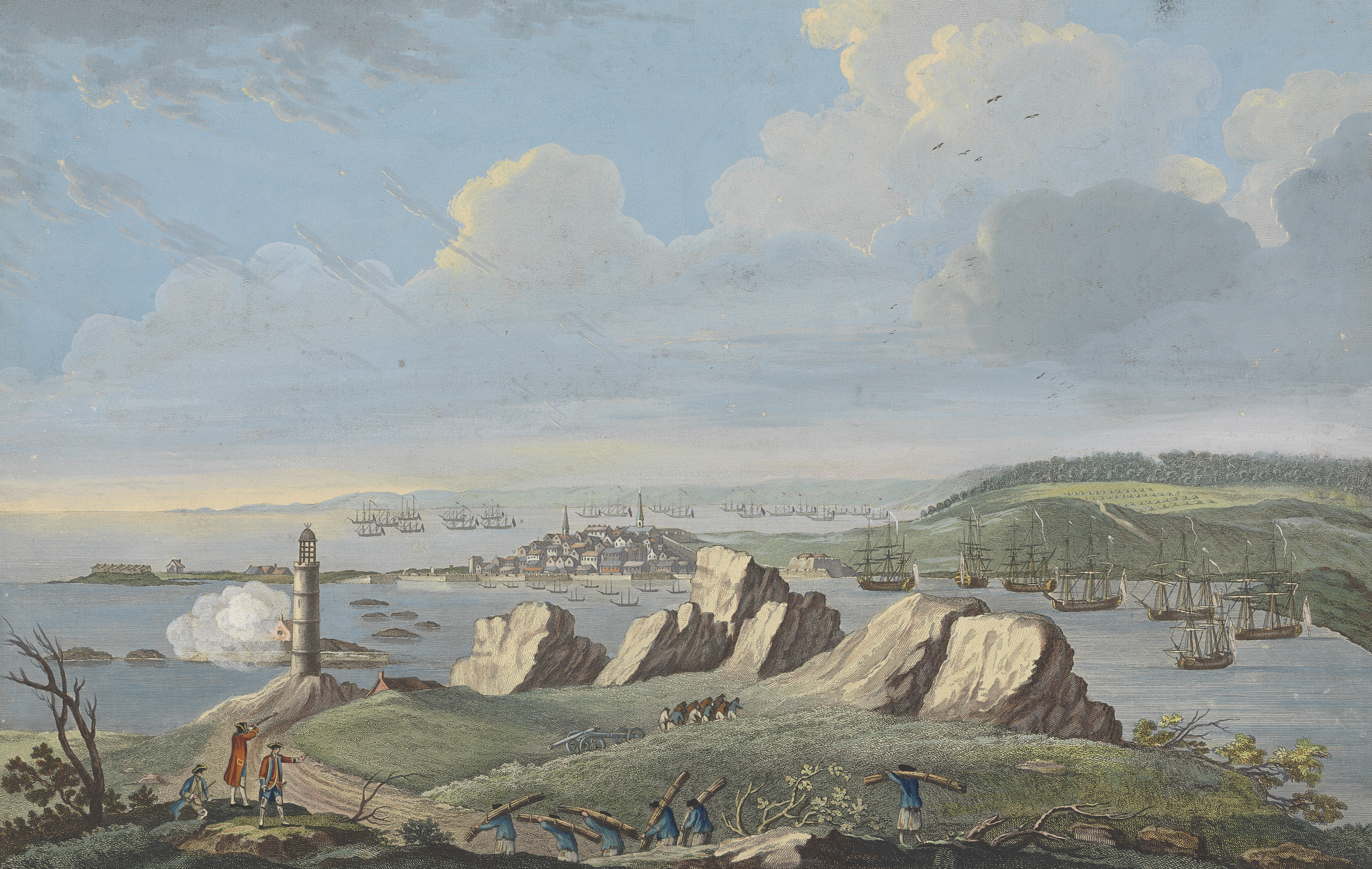
Louisbourg under siege in 1758. Dragon was part of the last squadron sent to supply the fortress.

Launched in September 1747 and commissioned in January 1748, Dragon did not take part in the War of the Austrian Succession, which ended that year, and then spent most of its time in port (like the rest of the fleet) until the resumption of war with Britain in 1755.

On 2 May 1758, Dragon sailed from the Île-d'Aix in the division of Du Chaffault (five ships, three frigates, one fluyt, and one snow) tasked with transporting troops to Canada. Commanded by Du Chaffault himself, it served as the flagship of the expedition. It was the only ship, along with the frigates, to carry its full artillery, the others having been lightened to embark 700 troops and large quantities of flour.

The Atlantic crossing was made without encountering British interceptors. Arriving at Île Royale on 29 May, Du Chaffault had to anchor at Port-Dauphin because the port of Louisbourg was blocked by a much stronger British squadron. It disembarked the troops at Sainte-Anne Bay so they could reach Louisbourg on foot, then sailed on 10 June for Quebec. The voyage was difficult due to alternating calms and contrary winds, and an epidemic broke out in the squadron. Forty men fell ill aboard Dragon, and fifteen died. Quebec was only reached on 11 July. Du Chaffault rested his crews there throughout August, but supplies ran low and the presence of the squadron was no longer justified after the fall of Louisbourg on 27 July. With the Canadian winter approaching, he departed on 9 September to return to France.

On the return voyage, Du Chaffault conducted commerce raiding. On 3 October, he captured the Charmante Poly, a ship arriving from Florida loaded with timber, beef, and flour, allowing him to resupply his vessels. He burned it and continued his route in increasingly rough seas. Dragon lost her rudder, but the damage was repaired. On 19 October, an East India Company ship, Carnavon, arriving from China, was captured with a valuable cargo worth 150,000 pounds sterling. Dragon took her in tow, which slowed the squadron.

On 27 October, about 66 miles north-northwest of Ushant, Du Chaffault encountered nine ships from Boscawen’s squadron returning from the siege of Louisbourg (four ships of the line, three frigates, and two fireships). However, Boscawen was convinced that he was facing British vessels and did not suspect danger. Du Chaffault formed his ships into line but was forced to abandon the Carnavon, which was slowing the squadron too much. Dragon, the best-armed ship, took the lead. With the wind in his favor, Du Chaffault managed by mid-afternoon to deliver a heavy broadside against Boscawen’s flagship, HMS Namur (90 guns), as well as the ships following it. Seizing the initiative, it then ordered a turn to simulate pursuit, but the British disengaged.

The squadron continued its voyage, but the weather worsened. The main topsail of Dragon was torn, and during the night, a wave broke her steering gear again. The carpenters repaired the damage, but the storm scattered the squadron and weakened the ship’s bow structure. Unable to risk tacking before Brest, Du Chaffault steered for the Pertuis d'Antioche, anchoring on 31 October in the Basques Roads off Île-d'Aix, and finally reaching safety at Rochefort on 12 November.

=== Battle of Quiberon Bay and the Vilaine blockade ===
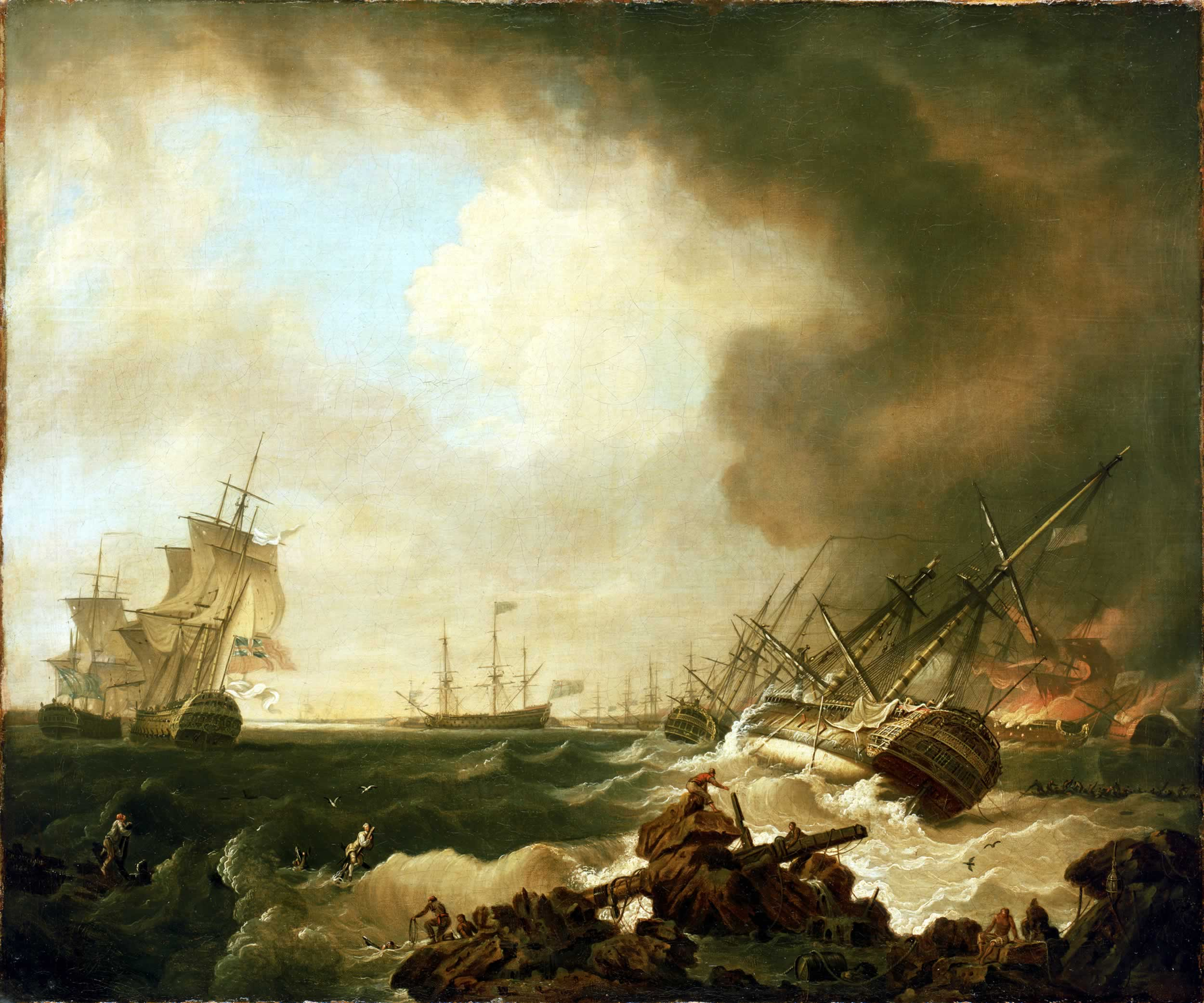
The Battle of Quiberon Bay (1759), in which Dragon took part.

In 1759, Dragon returned to Brest and formed part of the squadron of 21 ships under the Marshal of France Hubert de Brienne de Conflans, assembled for a planned landing in England. It took part in the Battle of Quiberon Bay on 20 November 1759. At that time, it was under the command of Louis-Charles Le Vassor de La Touche, in the white squadron—the squadron forming the main battle line, commanded by Conflans aboard his flagship, the French ship Soleil Royal. Dragon did not distinguish itself in this engagement, as it was not among the ships at the rear of the formation, where the British attack was concentrated.

In the aftermath of the French defeat, Dragon took refuge, along with six other ships—Robuste, Inflexible, Glorieux, Éveillé, Brillant, and Sphinx—accompanied by two frigates (Vestale and Aigrette) and two corvettes (Calypso and Prince Noir), in the Vilaine estuary. Owing to poor visibility, Glorieux and Éveillé ran aground. While the damage to Éveillé was without consequence, Glorieux suffered a leak; Inflexible, for its part, had lost its foremast and bowsprit. Subjected to a strict British blockade, it took more than two and a half years of effort by the two officers appointed by the duc d’Aiguillon, Charles-Henri-Louis d'Arsac de Ternay and Charles Jean d'Hector, to bring the ships out of the Vilaine estuary. On the night of 6–7 January 1761, in thick fog and then amid a violent storm, Dragon and Brillant, under the command of Ternay and d’Hector, followed by Vestale, Aigrette, and Calypso, managed to reach Brest or Rochefort. The frigate Vestale was recaptured on 9 January by HMS Unicorn, while Aigrette won her engagement against Seahorse.

=== Final mission in the Caribbean ===
Dragon was put to sea again at the end of the year. It was part of the escort of eight ships of the line and four frigates that sailed from Brest on 23 December 1761 with a large convoy of 5,500 troops bound for Martinique, which was on the verge of being attacked by the British. This force was placed under the command of Blénac-Courbon aboard the French ship Duc de Bourgogne (1751) (80 guns). It succeeded in breaking through the British blockade off Brest, but arrived shortly after the island’s capitulation (12 February 1762).

Dragon then proceeded to Saint-Domingue to land the troops to secure this important French colony against a possible landing attempt. This was her final mission. Returning to Brest, it was struck from the navy lists in the same year.

== See also ==
- History of the French Navy
- List of French ships of the line
- Military of New France
- French and Indian War

== Bibliography ==
- Taillemite, Étienne (2002). Dictionnaire des marins français [Dictionary of French sailors]. Paris: éditions Tallandier. ISBN 2-84734-008-4.
