= Camoël =

Commune in Brittany, France

Camoël Kamoel
- Commune
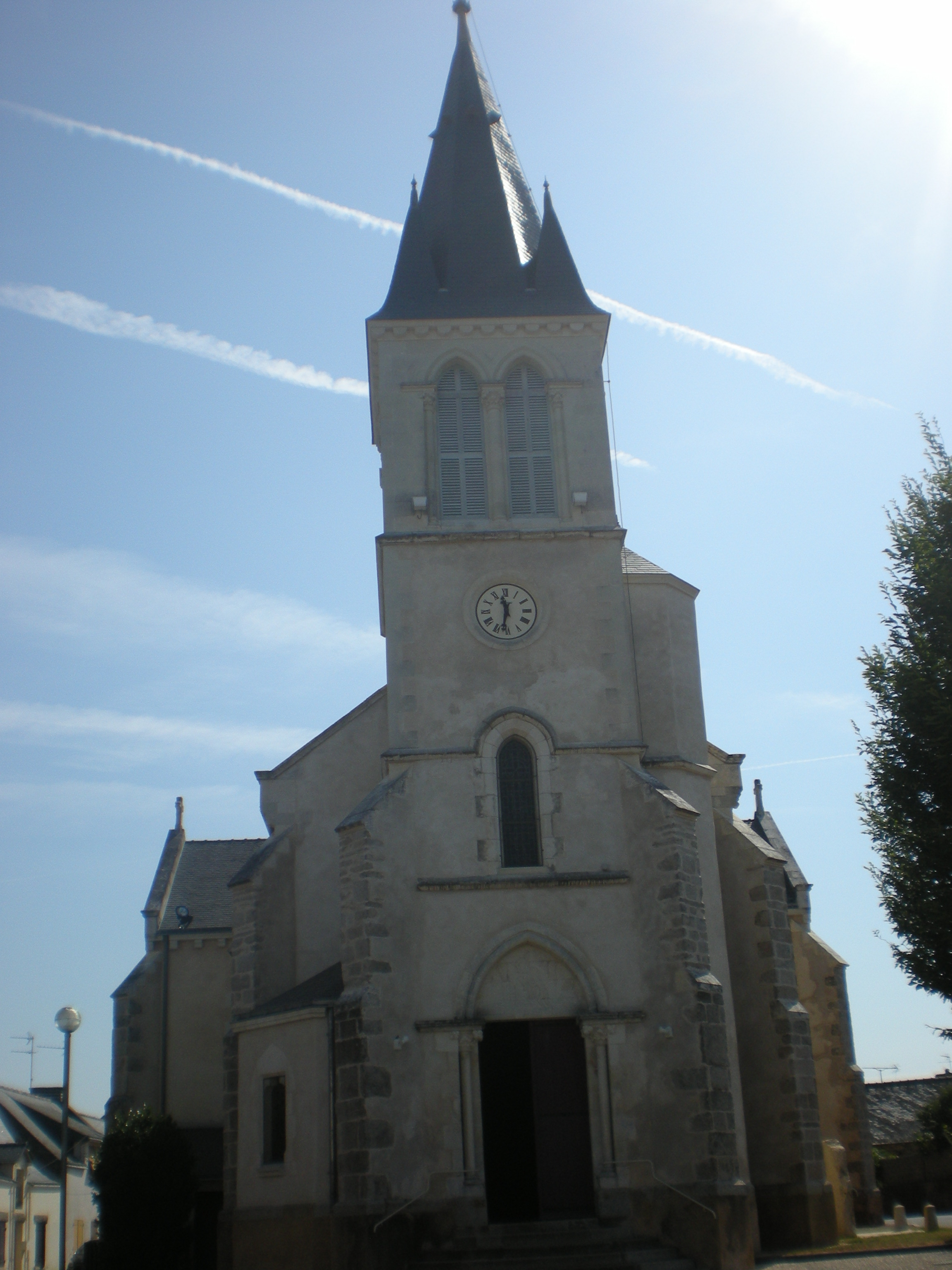
- The church in Camoël
- Location of Camoël
- Location within France Location within Brittany
- Coordinates: 47°28′58″N 2°23′36″W
- Country: France
- Region: Brittany
- Department: Morbihan
- Arrondissement: Vannes
- Canton: Muzillac
- Intercommunality: CA Presqu'île de Guérande Atlantique

Government
  - Mayor (2026–32): Régis Bouisson
- Area^{1}: 14.33 km^{2} (5.53 sq mi)
- Highest elevation: 44 m (144 ft)
- Lowest elevation: 0 m (0 ft)
- Population (2023): 1,183
  - Density: 82.55/km^{2} (213.8/sq mi)
- Time zone: UTC+01:00 (CET)
  - Summer (DST): UTC+02:00 (CEST)
- INSEE/Postal code: 56030 /56130
- ^{1} French Land Register data, which excludes lakes, ponds, glaciers > 1 km^{2} (0.386 sq mi or 247 acres) and river estuaries.

Camoël (French pronunciation: [kamwɛl]; Breton: Kamoel) is a commune in the Morbihan department of Brittany in north-western France.

== Demographics ==
Inhabitants of Camoël are called in French Camoëlais.

== Geography ==
Camoël is located in Guérande Peninsula, on the left bank of the mouth of the Vilaine river, 34 km (21 mi) southeast of Vannes . Historically it belongs to Lower Brittany. Until the 18th century, the spoken language was the Breton. Most hamlets have Breton names.

== Map ==
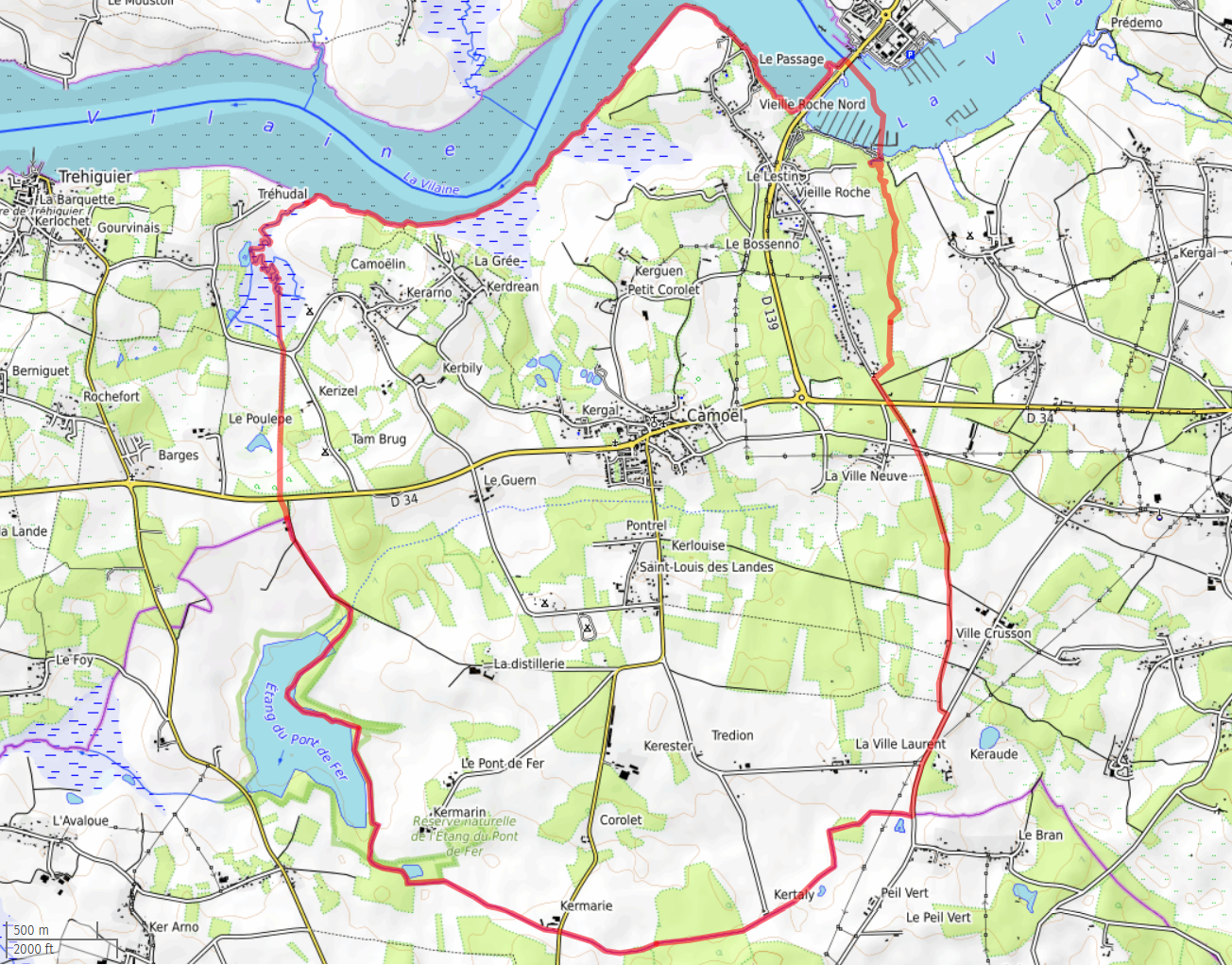
Topographic map

== See also ==
- La Baule - Guérande Peninsula
- Communes of the Morbihan department
