= French ship Éveillé (1752) =

Ship of the line of the French Navy

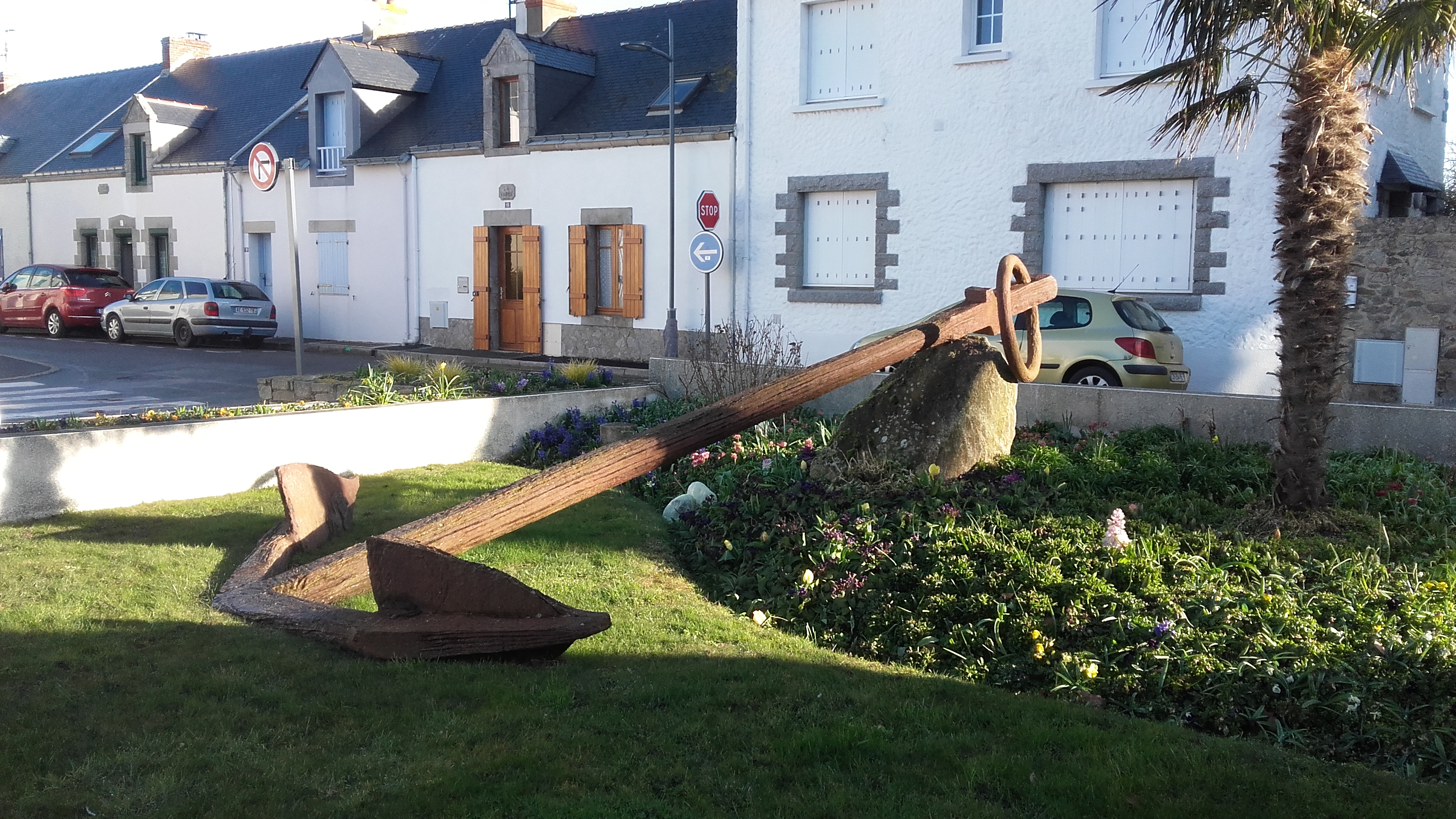
This is thought to be the anchor of the Eveillé dredged up at the entrance of La Turballe in 1969

Éveillé was a 2-deck 64-gun ship of the French Navy, laid down by A. Groignard in 1751 and launched at Rochefort in 1752. She was part of a naval shipbuilding boom between the end of the War of the Austrian Succession in 1748 and the start of the Seven Years' War in 1755. She took part in several battles before being paid off in 1771.

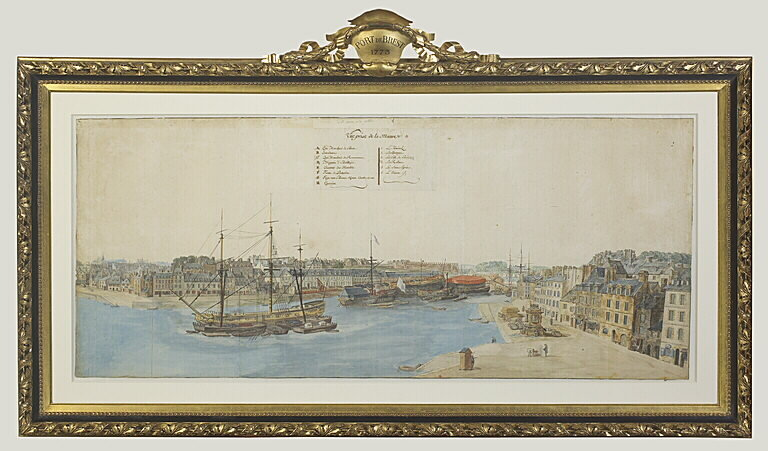
L'Éveillé in Brest by Louis Nicolas van Blarenberghe

== General characteristics ==
Éveillé was a moderately armed vessel laid down according to the standards defined in the 1730s–1740s by French builders to achieve a good cost/maneuverability/armament ratio in order to compete with the English navy, which had far more ships. It belonged to the category of ships known as "64 guns", the first example of which had been launched in 1735 and which was followed by several dozen others until the late 1770s, when they were definitively outclassed by the "74 guns".

As with all warships of the era, its hull was made of oak, its rigging of pine, its sails and ropes of hemp. It was less powerful than 74-gun ships because, in addition to carrying less artillery, some of it was also of smaller caliber: twenty-six 24-pounders on its first battery pierced with thirteen gunports, twenty-eight 12-pounders on its second battery pierced with fourteen, and ten 6-pounders on its quarterdecks and forecastle. This artillery corresponded to the usual armament of 64-gun ships. When firing, it could deliver a broadside weighing 540 pounds (approximately 265 kg) and double that if the ship fired simultaneously on both sides. It was made of iron, with each gun having in reserve approximately 50 to 60 rounds, not counting chain shot and grapeshot.

To feed the hundreds of men who made up its crew, Éveillé was also a large transporter that had to have two to three months' autonomy in fresh water and five to six months for food. Thus, it carried dozens of tons of water, wine, oil, vinegar, flour, hardtack, cheese, salted meat and fish, dried fruits and vegetables, condiments, cheese, and even live cattle intended to be slaughtered as the campaign progressed.

== Career history ==
It was commanded by Darot de Fontais when it was engaged in the first operations of the Seven Years' War. It was integrated into the small squadron of 6 ships and 3 frigates under Lieutenant General Jean-Baptiste Macnemara, which was to escort 18 vessels carrying reinforcements for Canada (under the orders of Dubois de La Motte). Macnemara's orders being to take the least possible risk against English forces, he contented himself with a cruise along the coasts before returning (3 May 1755–20 May 1755), leaving Dubois de La Motte to complete the mission alone. Macnemara ill and resigning, Éveillé remained in the same force, but it passed under the orders of Du Gay, who patrolled off Brest to protect the arrival of merchant convoys.

In 1757, Éveillé passed under the orders of Captain de Merville and was integrated into the division of 5 ships and one frigate under Joseph de Bauffremont, which was to sail for the West Indies and North America to defend the sugar islands and Louisbourg. On 31 January, it sailed from Brest for Saint-Domingue, where it arrived a few weeks later with the other ships to disembark troops. During this mission, it chased and captured, with the Diadème, the English ship HMS Greenwich. It then headed for Canada, arriving in May, thus participating in the major naval concentration that saved Louisbourg from invasion that year. In October, Éveillé left the place to return to France. Like the other ships, it was affected by the severe typhus epidemic that ravaged the crews and contaminated Brest upon arrival in November, causing thousands of deaths in the city. Upon arrival, Éveillé had to enter the port directly without anchoring in the roadstead due to a lack of valid sailors to maneuver.

Like most of the Brest fleet, it remained at quay in 1758 to reform the crews disorganized by the previous year's epidemic and to prepare for the 1759 campaign, which the government hoped would be decisive as a landing in England was planned. Under the command of Pierre-Bernardin Thierry de La Prévalaye, Éveillé was mobilized to form part of the center (2nd division) of the 21-ship squadron under Conflans, which was to escort the invasion fleet. On 20 November 1759, it took part in the disastrous Battle of Quiberon Bay, in which it played only a secondary role. In the aftermath of this defeat, it took refuge in the Vilaine with six other ships. and was blockaded there by the English fleet.

Having succeeded in crossing the bar of the Vilaine estuary, it struck the shallows without damage, then, to shelter from an attack by the Navy's fire ships, it was lightened of its heavy equipment to ascend as far as possible up the river. Under English blockade, it remained moored there until 28 November 1761, when it succeeded, thanks to the skill of Count d'Hector, in escaping during a storm in company with the Robuste. Facing a storm near the Spanish coasts, pursued by the English, it only managed to reach Brest on 16 January 1762.

In May 1762, Éveillé was assigned to the small force of Ternay (5 ships in total, including 2 ships of the line) tasked with attacking Newfoundland while convoying 570 soldiers. It was then commanded by the Chevalier de Monteil. The expedition arrived on the island at the end of June, captured the port of St. John's, and ravaged the English fisheries (capture and destruction of 460 ships, burning of the fisheries). But on 12 September, the appearance of a superior enemy force (6 ships, 1,500 troops on 9 transports) forced the expedition to return precipitously. Pursued by two English divisions, Éveillé had to take shelter for a few days at A Coruña with the Robuste. Éveillé returned to Brest on 23 January 1763 with the other ships as the war was drawing to a close. The ship had participated in the last French attempt to regain a foothold in North America after the loss of Canada.

Éveillé was struck from the fleet lists in 1771. Its name was reused the following year by a ship of the same type.

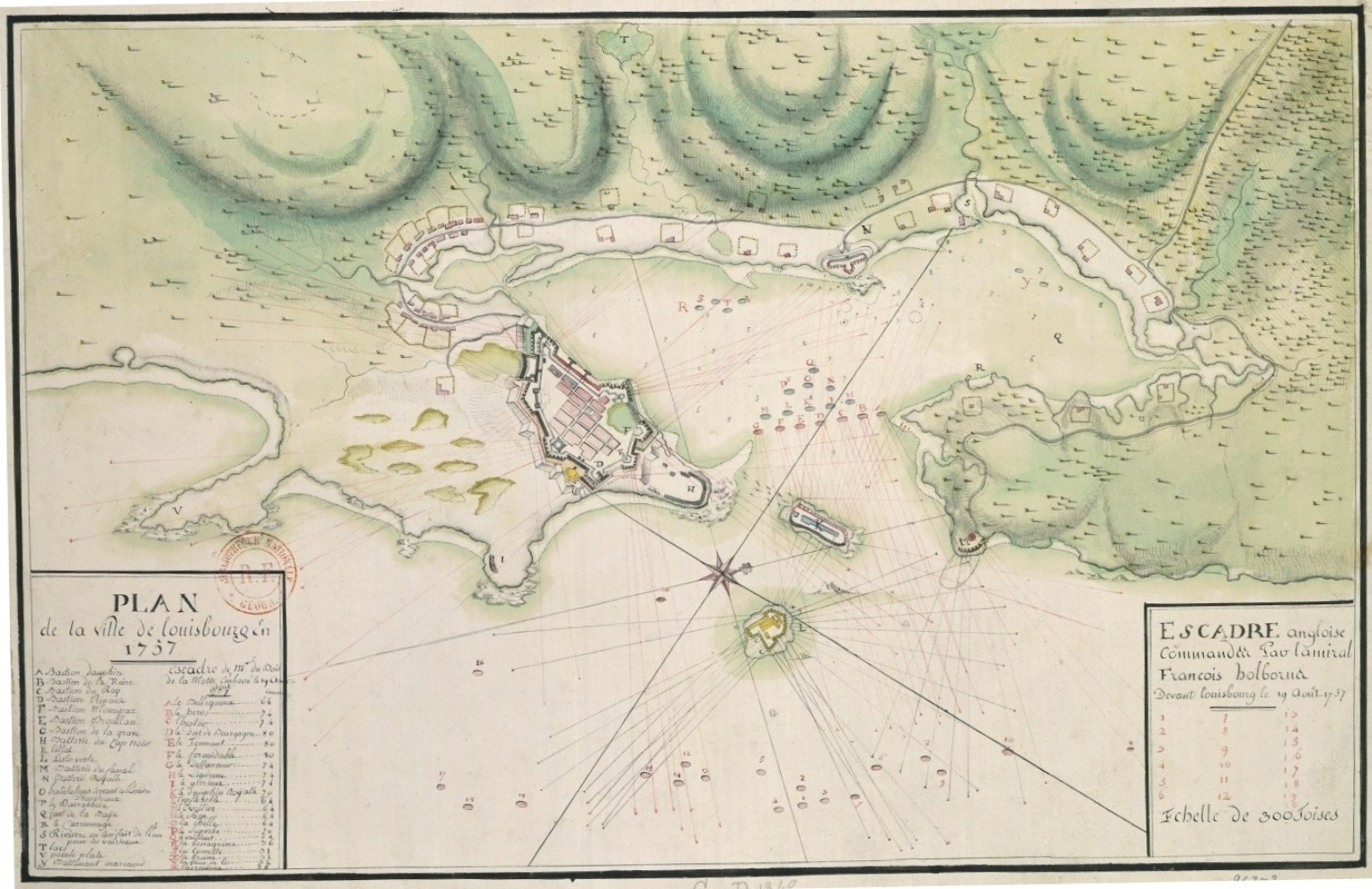
The defensive layout of Louisbourg in 1757. Éveillé participates in the protection of the place in Dubois de La Motte's squadron.

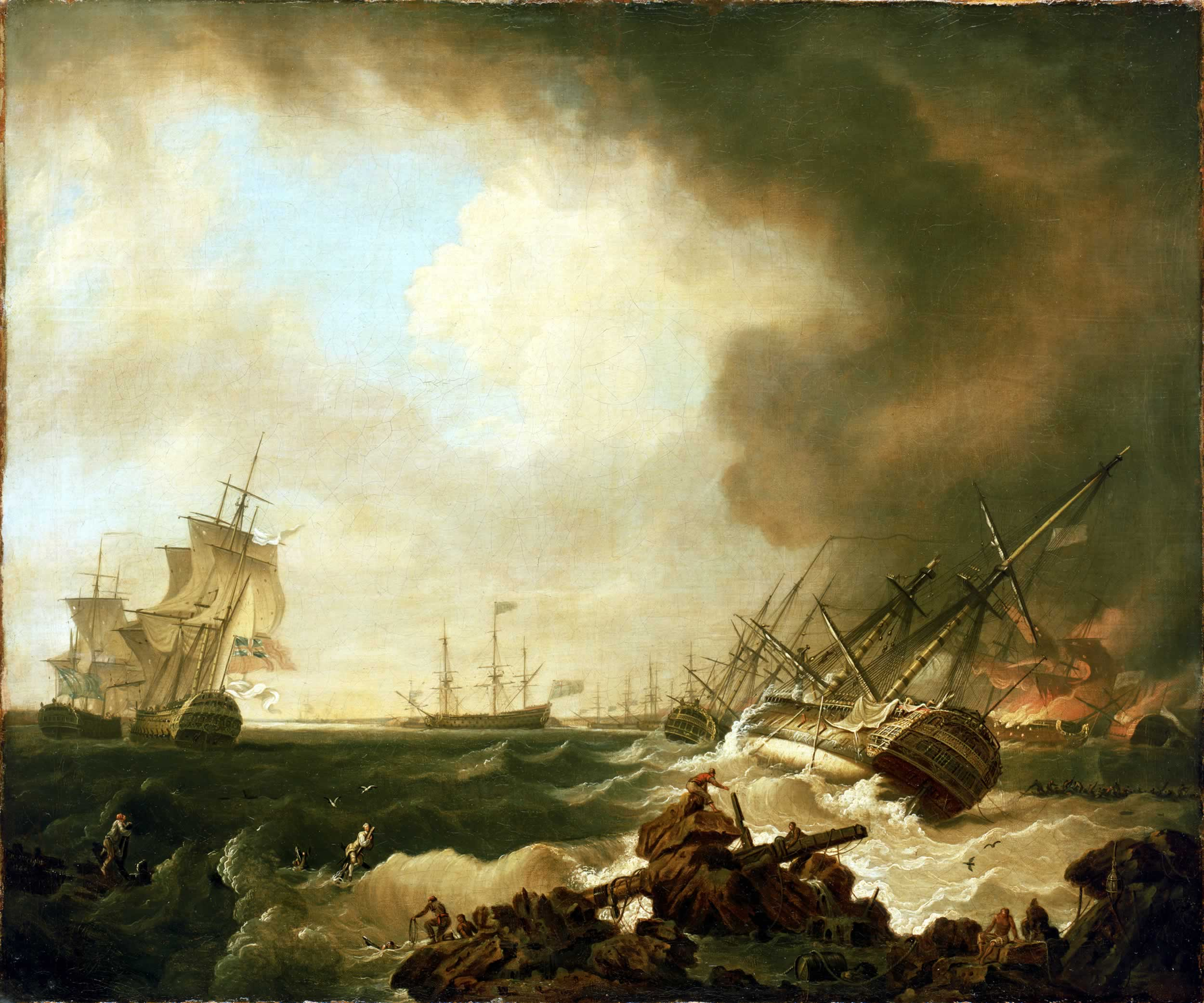
The Battle of Quiberon Bay, in which Éveillé participated in November 1759 in Conflans' squadron.

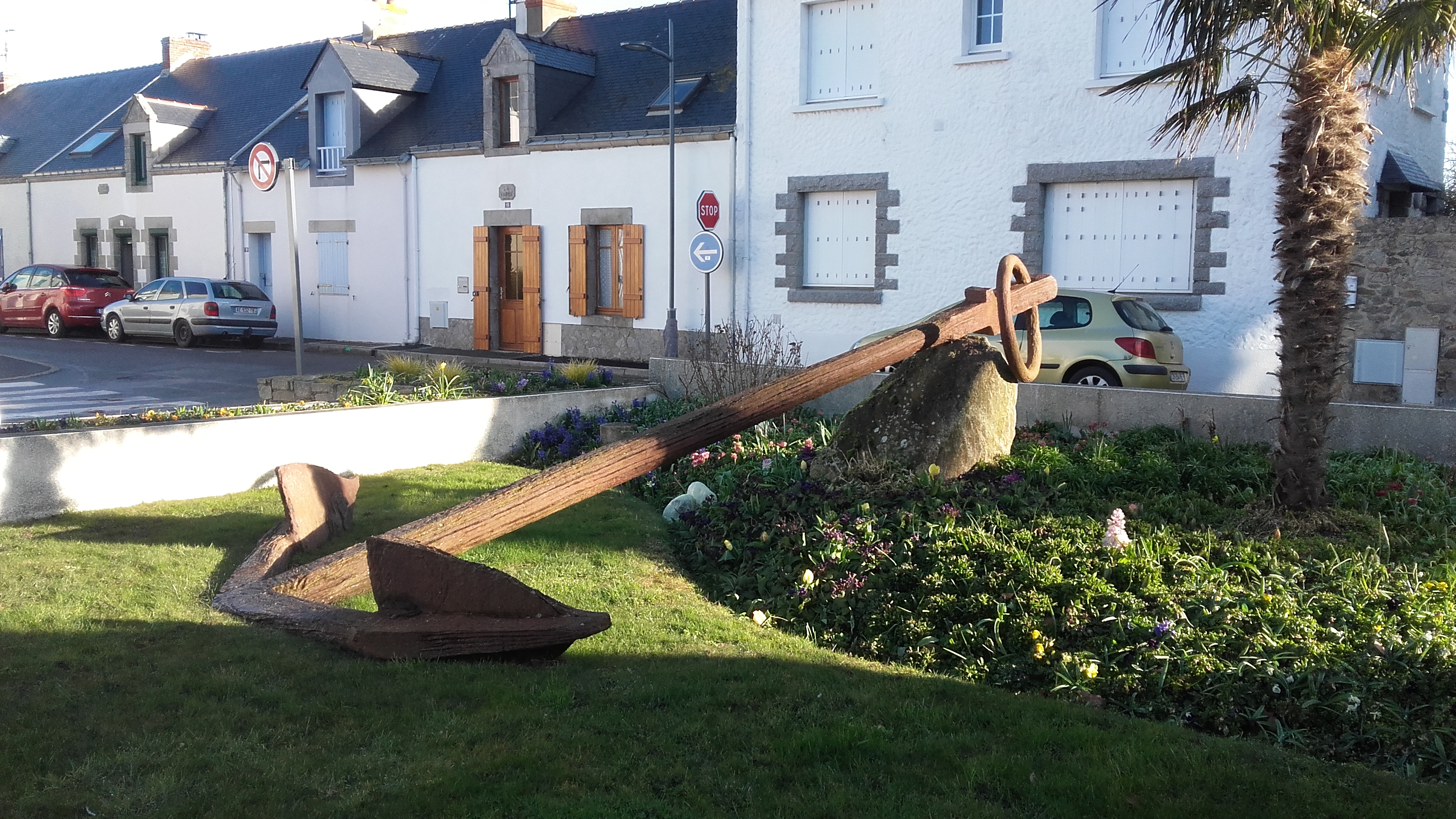
Anchor presumed to have belonged to the ship Éveillé, displayed in front of the Town Hall of La Turballe. Anchor fished at the entrance to the Vilaine in August 1969 by skipper Yvon Joncour and the crew of the La Turballe trawler Dohé. Gift from Monsieur Louis Mabo.

== See also ==
- New France
- List of French ships of the line
- History of the French Navy
- Military of New France

== Bibliography ==
- Meyer, Jean; Acerra, Martine (1994). Histoire de la marine française: des origines à nos jours (in French). Rennes: Ouest-France. ISBN 2-7373-1129-2.
- Taillemite, Étienne (2002). Dictionnaire des marins français. Dictionnaires (in French). Paris: Éditions Tallandier. ISBN 978-2-84734-008-2.
- Vergé-Franceschi, Michel (2002). Dictionnaire d'Histoire maritime. Bouquins (in French). Éditions Robert Laffont.
- Histoire de la marine française [History of the French Navy] (in French).
- Acerra, Marine; Zysberg, André (1997). L'essor des marines de guerre européennes : vers 1680-1790 (in French).
- Villiers, Patrick (2015). La France sur mer [France at Sea: From Louis XIII to Napoleon I]. Pluriel (in French). Paris: Fayard. p. 286. ISBN 978-2-8185-0437-6.
- Le Moing, Guy (May 2011). Les 600 plus grandes batailles navales de l'Histoire [The 600 Greatest Naval Battles in History] (in French). Rennes: Marines Éditions. p. 620. ISBN 978-2-35743-077-8.
- Roche, Jean-Michel (2005). Dictionnaire des bâtiments de la flotte de guerre française de Colbert à nos jours [Dictionary of French Warships from Colbert to the Present Day] (PDF) (in French). éditions LTP. p. 530. ISBN 978-2-9525917-0-6. OCLC 165892922.
- Lacour-Gayet, Georges (1902). La Marine militaire de la France sous le règne de Louis XV [The French Navy under the Reign of Louis XV] (in French). Honoré Champion éditeur.
- Lacour-Gayet, Georges (1905). La marine militaire de France sous le règne de Louis XVI [The French Navy under the Reign of Louis XVI] (in French). Paris: éditions Honoré Champion.
- Dictionnaire des marins français [Dictionary of French Sailors] (in French).
- Troude, Onésime (1867). Batailles navales de la France [Naval Battles of France] (in French). Paris: Challamel aîné. p. 453.
