= Arzal =

Commune in Brittany, France

Arzal Arzhal
- Commune
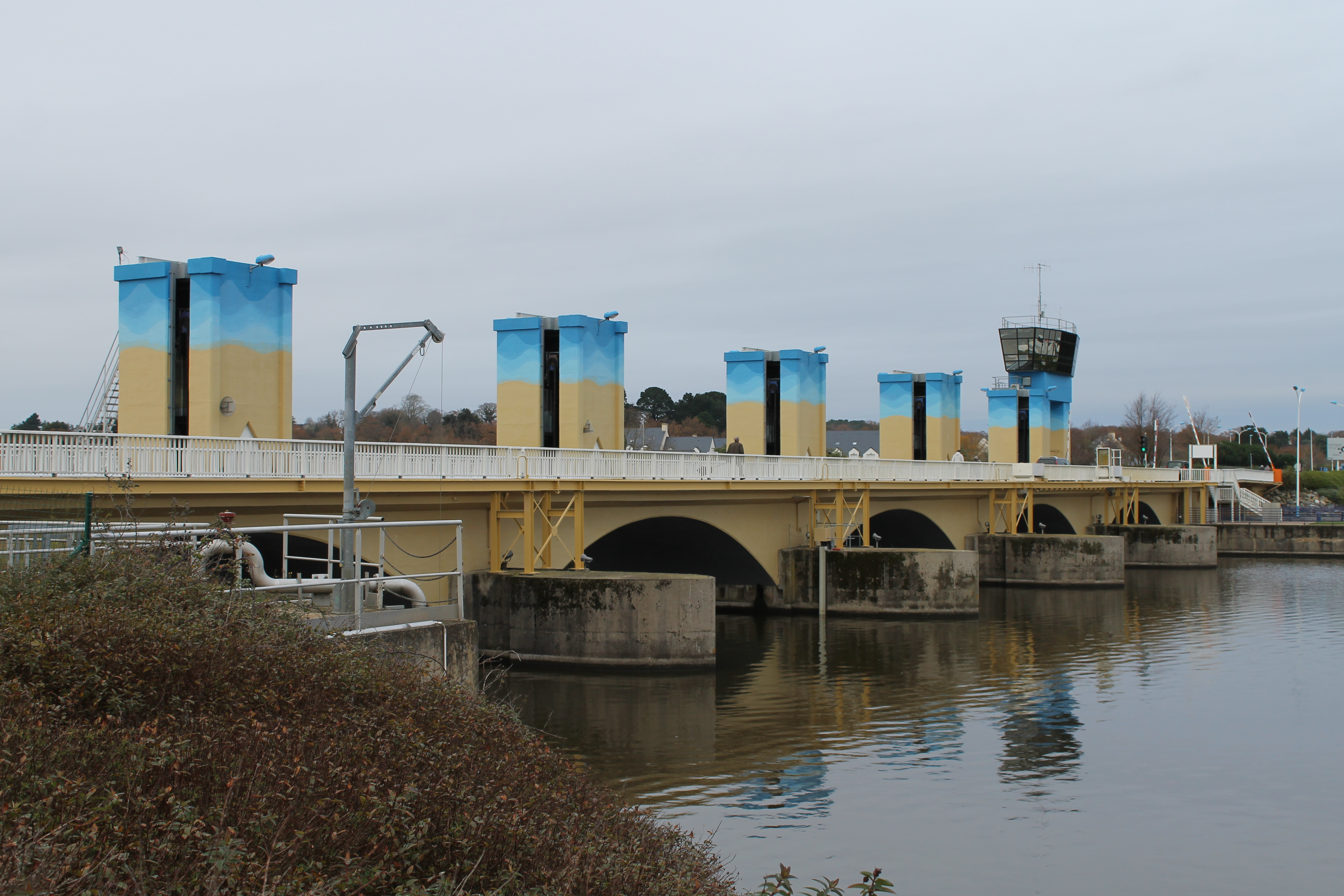
- The Arzal Dam
- Location of Arzal
- Location within France Location within Brittany
- Coordinates: 47°31′03″N 2°22′30″W
- Country: France
- Region: Brittany
- Department: Morbihan
- Arrondissement: Vannes
- Canton: Muzillac
- Intercommunality: CC Arc Sud Bretagne

Government
  - Mayor (2026–32): Samuel Féret
- Area^{1}: 23.44 km^{2} (9.05 sq mi)
- Highest elevation: 62 m (203 ft)
- Lowest elevation: 0 m (0 ft)
- Population (2023): 1,846
  - Density: 78.75/km^{2} (204.0/sq mi)
- Time zone: UTC+01:00 (CET)
  - Summer (DST): UTC+02:00 (CEST)
- INSEE/Postal code: 56004 /56190
- ^{1} French Land Register data, which excludes lakes, ponds, glaciers > 1 km^{2} (0.386 sq mi or 247 acres) and river estuaries.

Arzal (French pronunciation: [aʁzal]; Breton: Arzhal) is a commune in the Morbihan department in the Brittany region in northwestern France.

== Population ==
Inhabitants of Arzal are called Arzalais.

== See also ==
- Communes of the Morbihan department
