= French ship Sphinx (1755) =

Ship of the line of the French Navy

History

France
- Name: Sphinx
- Builder: Brest
- Laid down: 1752
- Launched: 20 August 1755
- In service: February 1756
- Out of service: 1775
- Fate: Broken up 1775

General characteristics
- Class & type: Sphinx class ship of the line
- Displacement: 2200 tonneaux
- Tons burthen: 1200 port tonneaux
- Length: 49.1 metres
- Beam: 13.3 metres
- Draught: 7 metres
- Propulsion: Sails
- Sail plan: Full-rigged ship
- Armament: 64 guns

Sphinx was a 64-gun ship of the line of the French Navy, lead ship of her class. She was designed by Pierre Salinoc from 1752 to 1755 and fought in several engagements of the Seven Years' War before being broken up in 1775 and replaced by another 64 gun ship of the same name.
