= Emmanuel-Auguste de Cahideuc, comte Dubois de la Motte =

Emmanuel-Auguste de Cahideuc, Comte Dubois de la Motte
- Born: 1683
- Died: 23 October, 1764 (aged 80–81); Rennes, Kingdom of France
- Military career
- Allegiance: France
- Branch: French Navy
- Rank: Vice-Admiral
- Conflicts: War of the Spanish Succession; French and Indian War; Seven Years' War

Vice-Admiral Emmanuel-Auguste de Cahideuc, comte Dubois de la Motte (1683 – 23 October 1764) was a French Navy officer.

Emmanuel-Auguste de Cahideuc was born in Rennes, Province of Brittany, in 1683. He entered the navy as a midshipman in 1698, and received his first command (of the privateer ship Argonaute) in 1708. Following a promotion to sub-lieutenant, he fought at Rio de Janeiro in 1711 during the War of the Spanish Succession. In 1718 he became a knight of the Order of Saint-Louis.

Dubois de La Motte was promoted to captain in 1738, and directed three campaigns in the West Indies. In 1751, following the third of those campaigns, he was promoted to Rear-Admiral and made governor general of Saint-Domingue.

He served extensively off the coast of North America, including being assigned to help defend Louisbourg, on Cape Breton Island, in the Seven Years' War. Although he fell ill shortly after arriving, his superior naval strength delayed British supremacy over the island for a year, the British failing in their attempts in the Louisbourg Expedition (1757).

In 1758, with his active career over (at 75 years of age), he participated in a battle to repulse a British landing near Saint-Malo, which ultimately proved successful. First knighted in 1718, Dubois de la Motte died in Rennes, France a knight grand cross and vice-admiral.
