= French frigate Aigrette =

History

France
- Name: Aigrette
- Ordered: 14 November 1759
- Builder: Le Havre, plans by Jean-Joseph Ginoux
- Laid down: September 1755
- Launched: March 1756
- In service: July 1756
- Fate: Broken up in Brest in 1789

General characteristics
- Class & type: Blonde-class frigate
- Displacement: 880 tonneaux
- Tons burthen: 480 port tonneaux
- Length: 40.3 metres
- Beam: 10.3 metres
- Depth of hold: 5.3 metres
- Complement: 220
- Armament: 32 guns comprising: Gun deck: 26 × 8-pounder long guns; Quarterdeck and forecastle: 6 × 4-pounder guns

Aigrette was a Blonde-class 30-gun frigate of the French Navy. She took part in the Seven Year War and in the War of American Independence.

== Career ==
Aigrette took part in the Battle of Quiberon Bay on 20 November 1759 under Longueville, and escaped into Vilaine River.

On 27 July 1778, she took part in the Battle of Ushant. She was then part in the Armada of 1779.

In 1779, Aigrette was under Lieutenant Mortemart. On 18 March, she was fought HMS Arethusa, under captain Charles Holmes Everitt. Arethusa sustained damage and was wrecked the next day off Ushant, at a point 48°27′4″N 5°4′4″W.

In 1781, she was under Traversay, part of the squadron under Grasse. She took part in the action of 4 January 1781.

Aigrette took part in the Battle of Fort Royal on 29 April and 30 April 1781. In July 1781, she sailed to Havana to ferry 500,000 piasters that the Spanish government was providing to fund the French squadron. She returned to Bahamas with the funds in August. She took part in the Battle of the Chesapeake on 5 September 1781.}

In September 1781, she ferried troops from Annapolis to James River to support the Siege of Yorktown. On 11 September, she captured HMS Richmond.

== Fate ==
Aigrette was condemned in Brest in October 1789.
