= Ploeren =

Ploeren Ploveren
- Commune
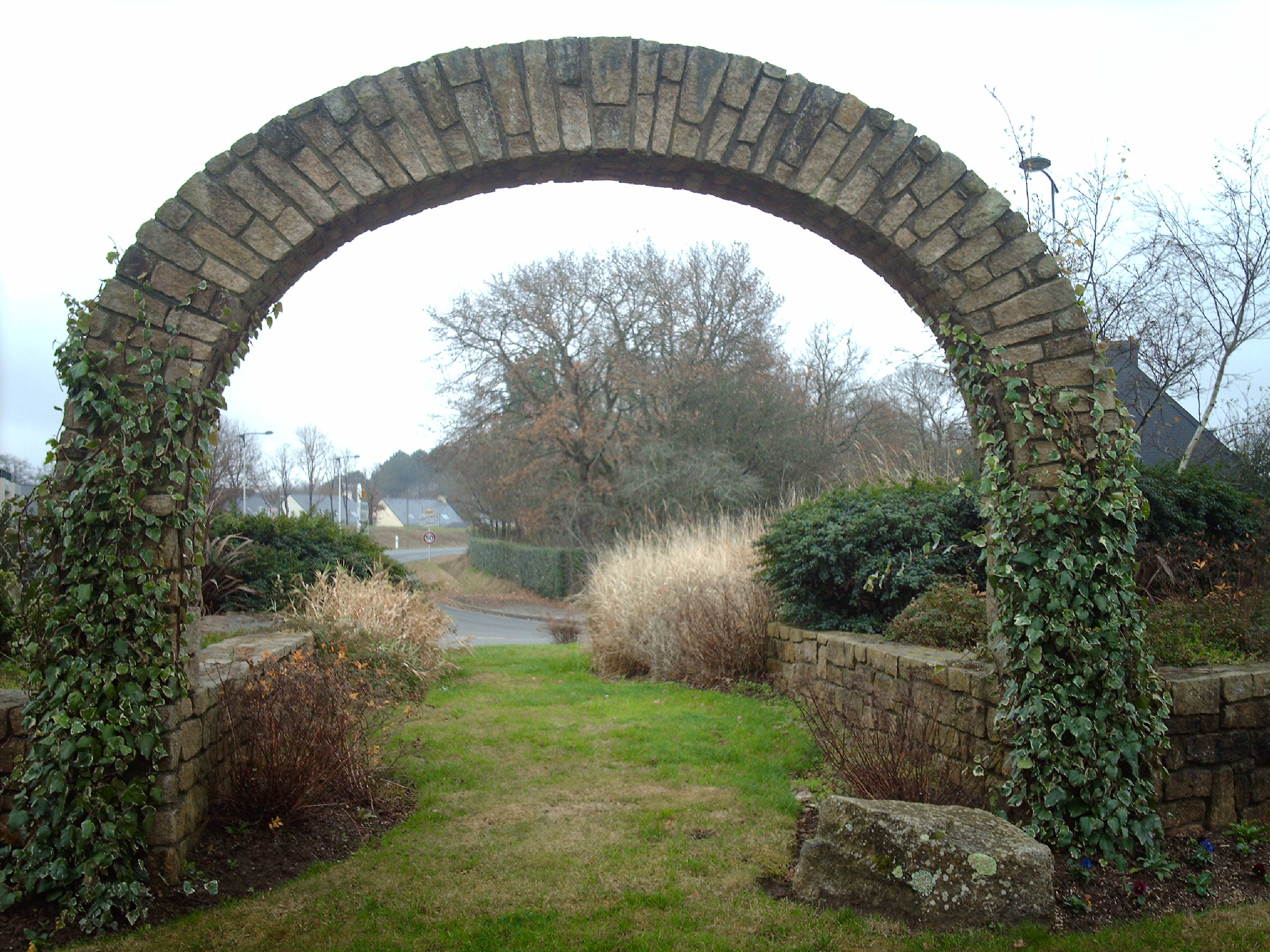
- The stone arch at the entrance to Ploeren

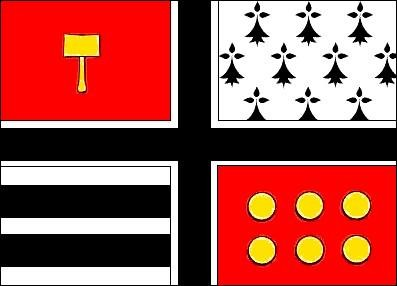
- Flag Coat of arms
- Location of Ploeren
- Location within France Location within Brittany
- Coordinates: 47°39′25″N 2°51′54″W
- Country: France
- Region: Brittany
- Department: Morbihan
- Arrondissement: Vannes
- Canton: Vannes-2
- Intercommunality: Golfe du Morbihan - Vannes Agglomération

Government
  - Mayor (2026–32): Pascal Le Bouëdec
- Area^{1}: 20.44 km^{2} (7.89 sq mi)
- Highest elevation: 58 m (190 ft)
- Lowest elevation: 3 m (9.8 ft)
- Population (2023): 6,790
  - Density: 332/km^{2} (860/sq mi)
- Time zone: UTC+01:00 (CET)
  - Summer (DST): UTC+02:00 (CEST)
- INSEE/Postal code: 56164 /56880
- ^{1} French Land Register data, which excludes lakes, ponds, glaciers > 1 km^{2} (0.386 sq mi or 247 acres) and river estuaries.

Ploeren (French pronunciation: [pleʁɛ̃]; Breton: Ploveren) is a commune in the Morbihan department of the region of Brittany in north-western France.

== Geography ==
It is situated on the main expressway RN165 from Nantes to Brest, adjoining the city of Vannes by the west. The village is very close to the Golfe du Morbihan, and is bordered by Plescop to the north, by Plougoumelen to the west, by Baden, by Arradon to the south and by Vannes to the east.

Ploeren's territory is 20.44 km^{2}.

== Map ==
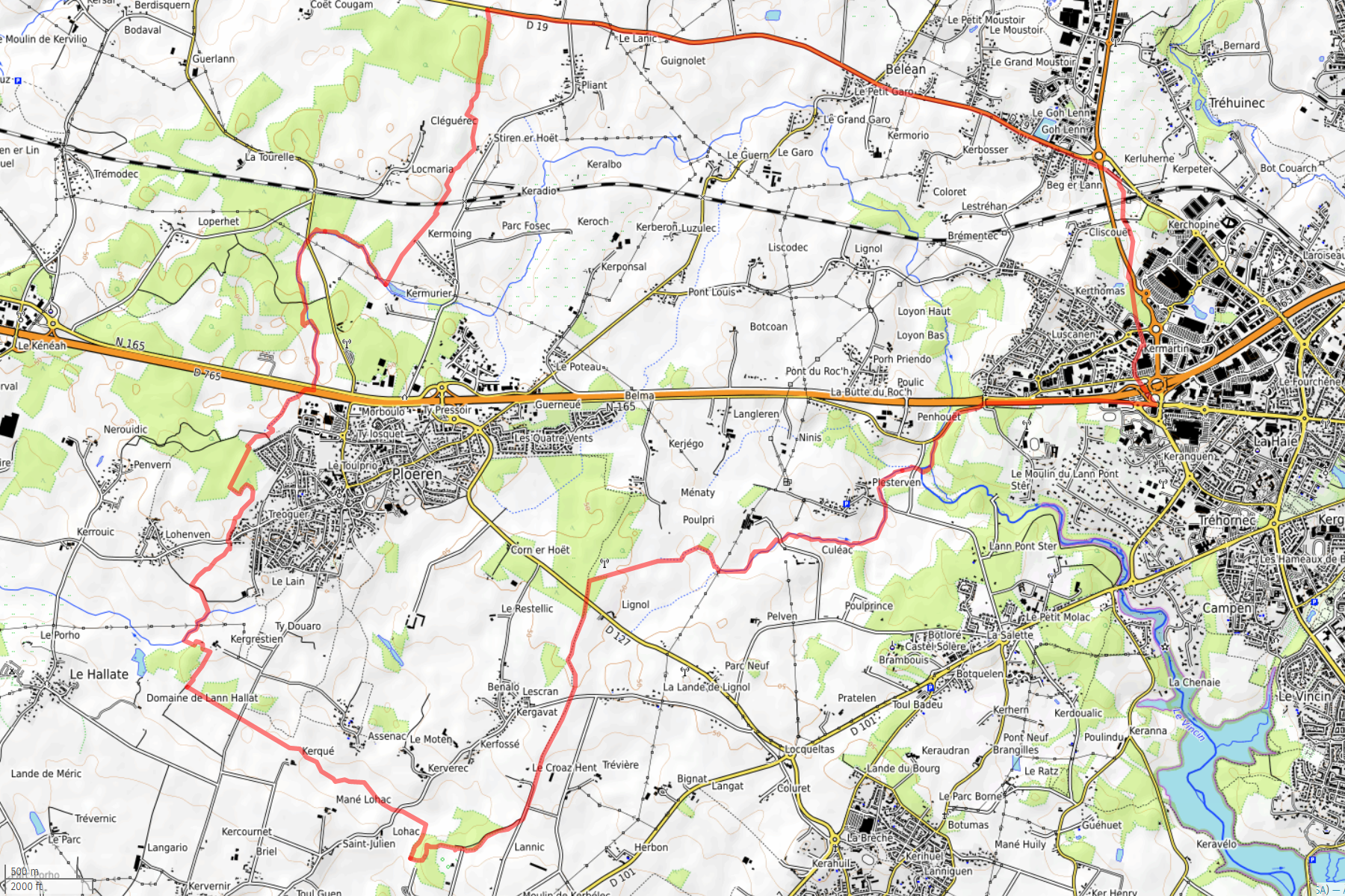
Topographic map.

== Population ==
The population has grown very quickly over the past 55 years.

Historical population
Year	Pop.	±% p.a.
1968	1,031	—
1975	1,584	+6.33%
1982	2,114	+4.21%
1990	2,709	+3.15%
1999	3,974	+4.35%
2007	5,661	+4.52%
2012	6,111	+1.54%
2017	6,575	+1.47%
2023	6,790	+0.54%
Source: INSEE

== Monuments ==
There are a few monuments, like the Saint-Martin church, and, more surprisingly, a replica of the Statue of Liberty, visible from the main road.

There is also the Triskell, a cultural center with a library, a theater and a lot of space to organize events at the heart of the village.

To organize bigger events, one can find the multipurpose hall named the Spi, surrounded by 2 football fields, tennis courts and another hall.

== Education ==
There are 2 primary schools: Georges-Brassens, a public school, and Ker Anna, a private school.

In 2013, 54 primary school students learned Breton (roughly 10% of primary school students).

== Administration ==
The former mayor, Corentin Hilly, invented a new type of traffic lane named “Voie 2M”, which consists in two separate lanes; the first one is a normal road for engine vehicles, and the second one is for all ways of moving without an engine, like riding a bicycle or walking.

The current mayor is Gilbert Lorho who was elected in 2014.

== Twin towns ==
Ploeren is paired with: Samtgemeinde Land Wursten (Germany)

== People ==
Ploeren was the birthplace of:

- Mathieu Berson (born 1980), footballer

== See also ==
- Communes of the Morbihan department
- Veneti (Gaul)
