= Gulf of Morbihan =

Island dotted inlet in Western France

- French: golfe du Morbihan; Breton: Mor Bihan Gwened
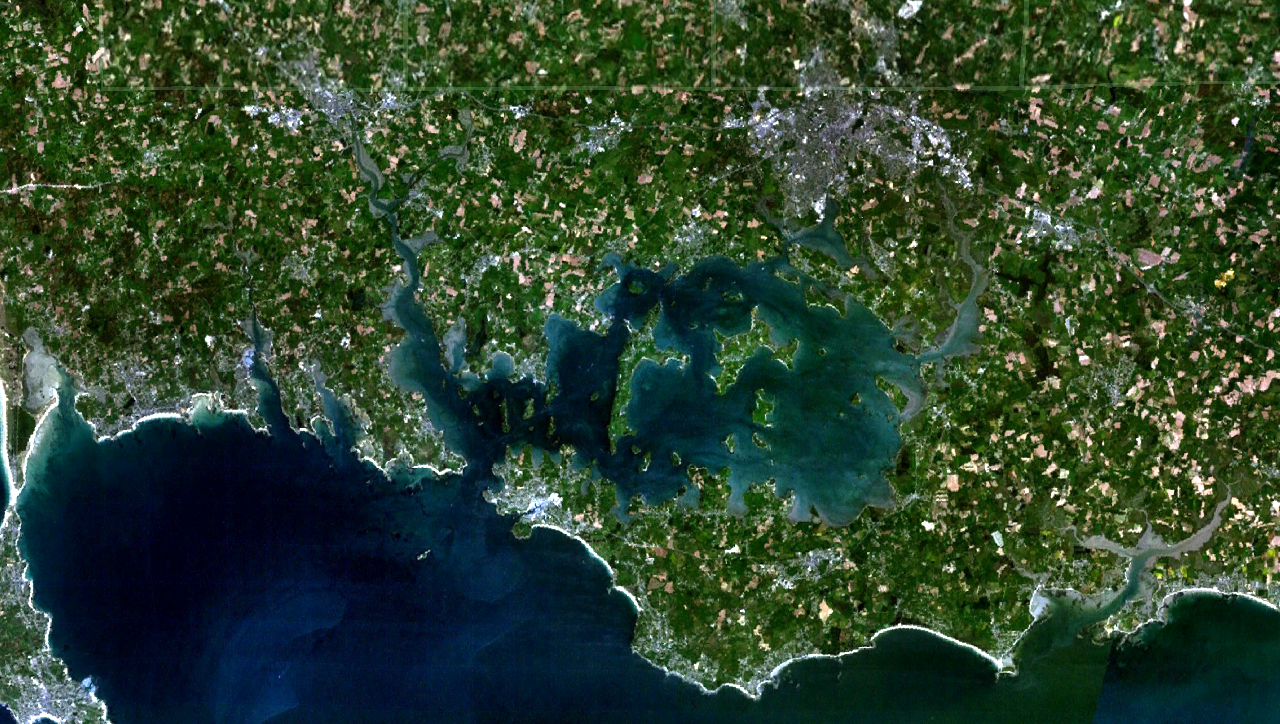

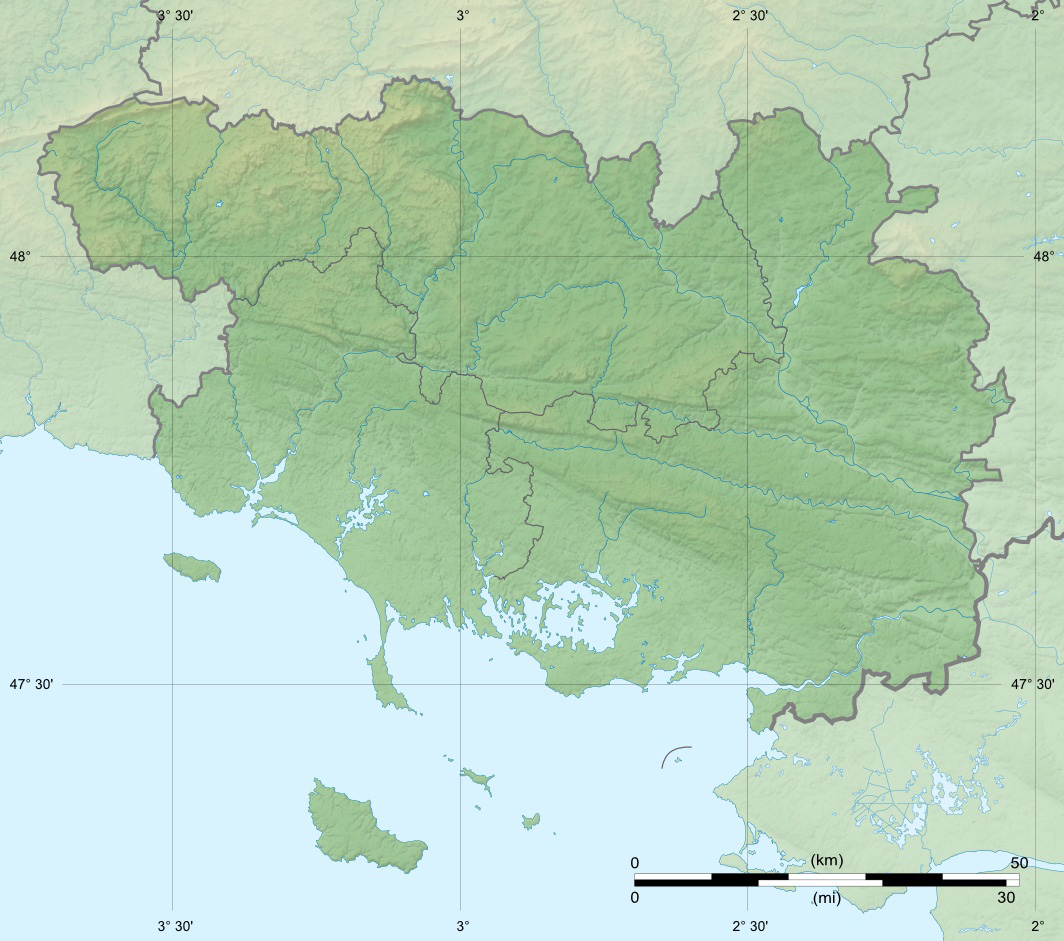
- Location within Morbihan
- Location: Bay of Biscay
- Coordinates: 47°36′N 2°48′W
- Ocean/sea sources: Atlantic Ocean
- Basin countries: France
- Max. length: 20 km (12 mi)
- Max. width: 15 km (9.3 mi)
- Surface area: 115 km^{2} (44 mi^{2})
- Average depth: 23 m (75 ft)

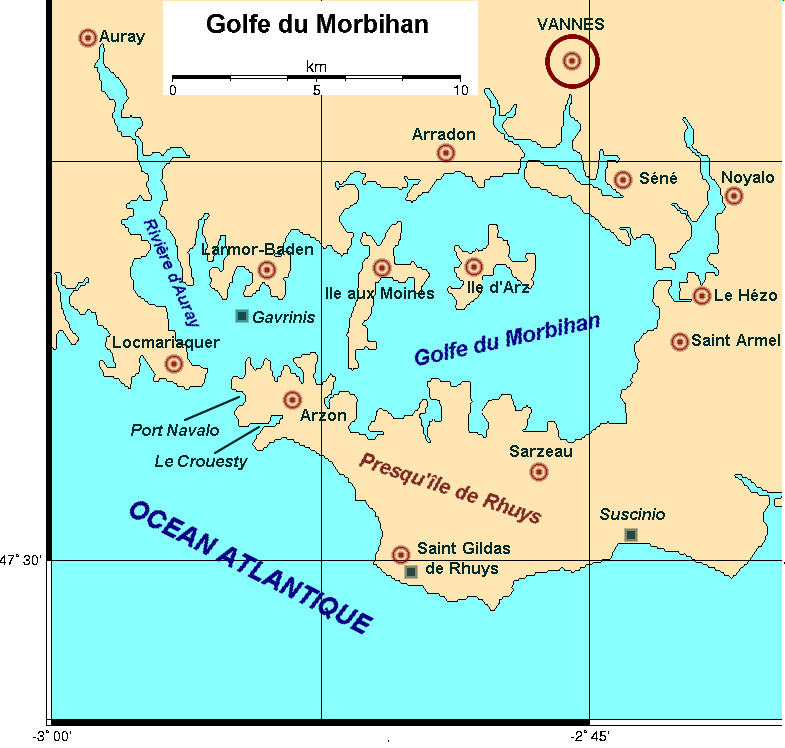
Map

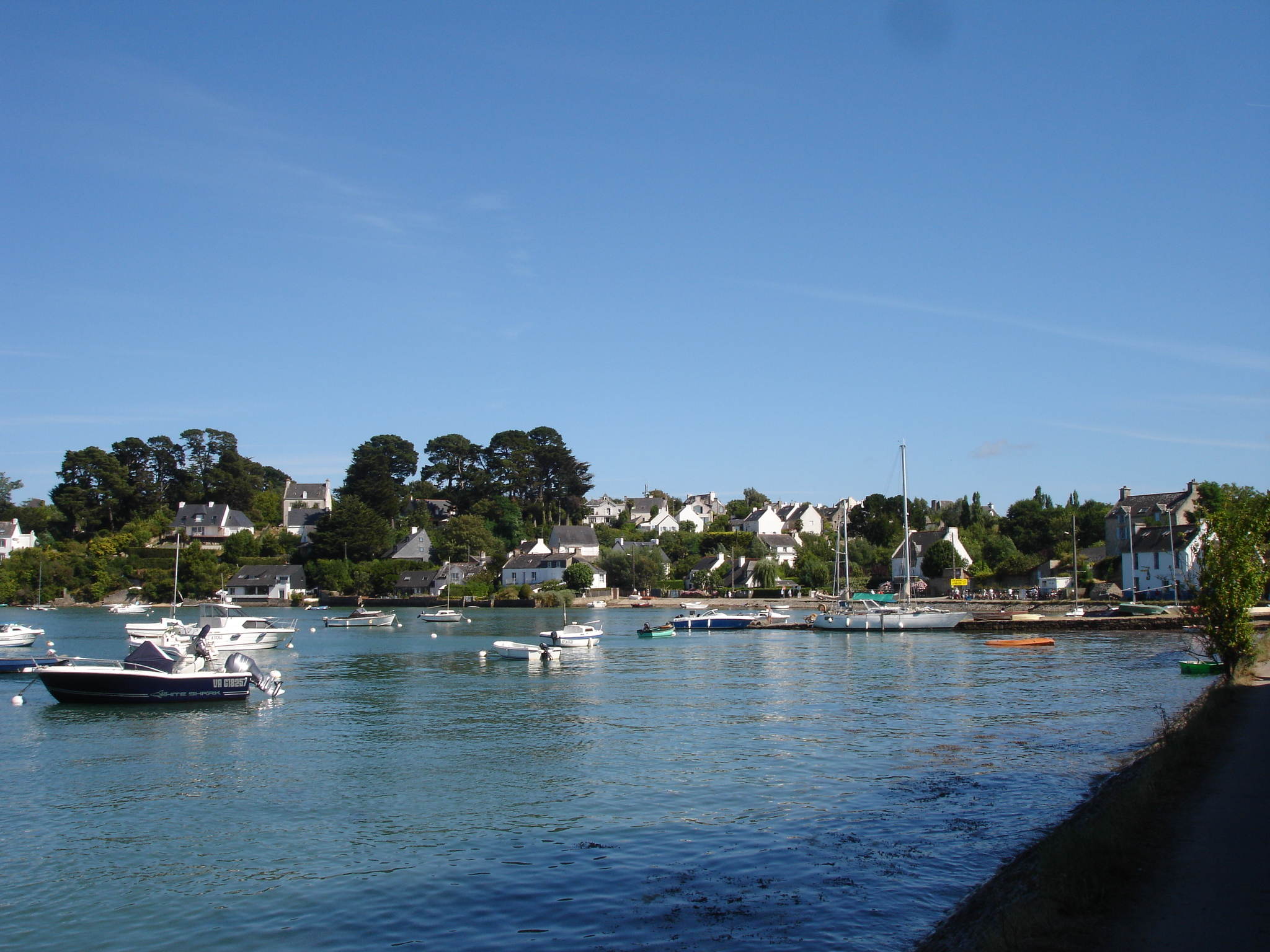
Port of Île aux Moines

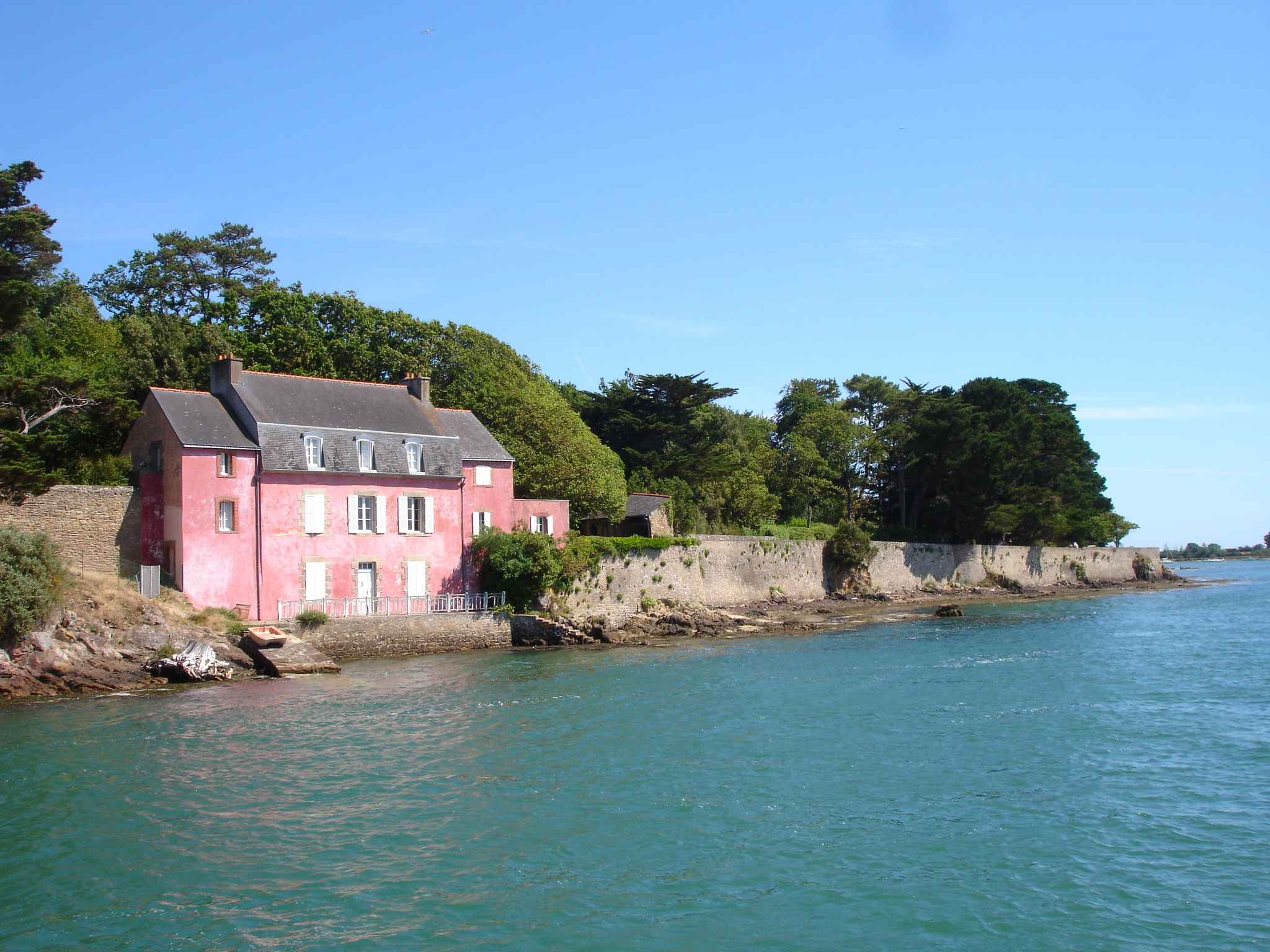
Pink house near Vannes

The Gulf of Morbihan (French: golfe du Morbihan, pronounced [ɡɔlf dy mɔʁbiɑ̃]; Breton: Mor Bihan Gwened) is a natural harbour on the coast of the department of Morbihan in southern Brittany, France. Its English name is taken from the French version, le golfe du Morbihan, though it would be more precisely called 'the Morbihan' as its Breton name 'Ar Mor Bihan' means 'the little sea'. (Compare the Welsh y môr bychan with that for the Atlantic Ocean, Ar Mor Bras.) Legend says that there are as many islands in the Gulf as there are days of the year. In fact the gulf has about 40, depending on the tides. Many islands are private property, except the largest two, Île-aux-Moines and Île-d'Arz.

== Geography ==
=== Tides and currents ===
The gulf is sheltered from the Atlantic Ocean by the peninsula of Rhuys, a small gap between Port-Navalo (in the commune of Arzon) and Kerpenhir (commune of Locmariaquer) lets the water in and out. Because this gap is only approximately 900 metres (3,000 ft) wide, the tidal currents are strong and water speeds can reach up to 9 knots (17 km/h; 10 mph).

The deepest part of the gulf is approximately 30 metres (98 ft) deep, in the tidal creeks near the Port Navalo outlet on the southwestern edge of the gulf. The depth generally decreases toward the east, with the area east of Île-d'Arz having depths between 1–10 metres (3–33 ft). The gulf is largely ringed by short cliffs no higher than 10 metres (33 ft).

== Archaeology ==
The area around the gulf features an extraordinary range of megalithic monuments, including on the islands of the gulf. There are passage dolmens, stepped pyramids with underground dolmen chambers, stone circles, and giant menhirs, among others. The site best known to outsiders is Carnac, where remains of a dozen rows of huge standing stones run for over ten kilometers. The passage grave of Gavrinis, on a small island in the Gulf, is one of the most important such sites in Europe. Some of the ruins have been dated to at least 3300 BC — 200 years older than England's Stonehenge.

== Festivals ==
Every alternate year a yachting festival is held, it is known as 'La Semaine du Golfe Du Morbihan' celebrating Brittany's culture, music and boating and marine traditions. In 2017, 1,450 boats entered the regatta in addition to the hundreds of spectator craft. The highlight of the festival is a 'Big Parade of Sail' in which all the boats are displayed en route from Port Navalo to Vannes.

== Communes ==
- Locmariaquer
- Auray
- Plougoumelen
- Le Bono
- Baden
- Larmor-Baden
- Arradon
- Île-aux-Moines
- Île-d'Arz
- Vannes
- Séné
- Theix
- Noyalo
- Le Hézo
- Saint-Armel
- Sarzeau
- Saint-Gildas-de-Rhuys
- Arzon
