= Île-aux-Moines =

Commune in Brittany, France

Île-aux-Moines Enizenac'h
- Commune
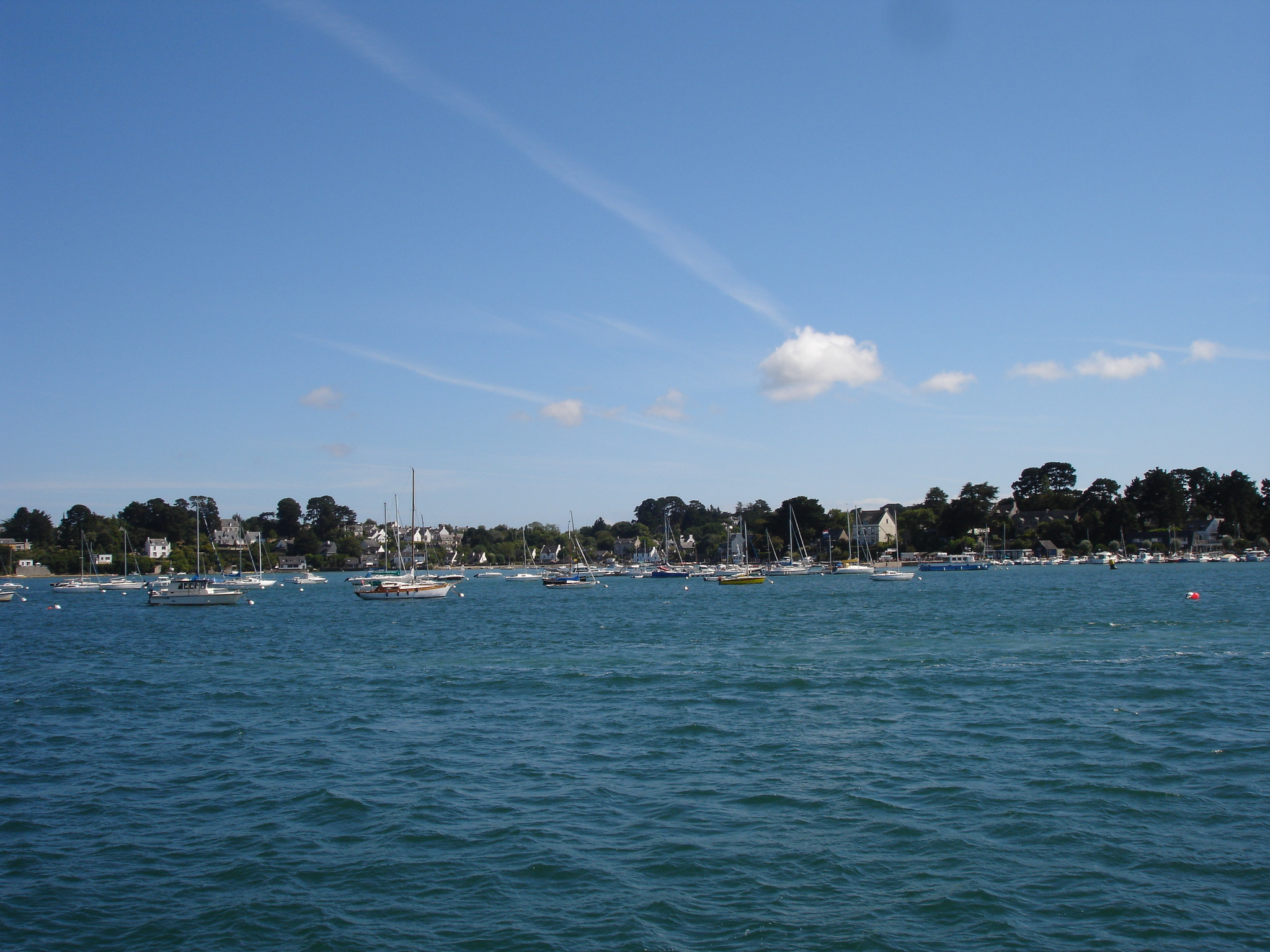
- The island lies in the Gulf of Morbihan

- Coat of arms
- Location of Île-aux-Moines
- Location within France Location within Brittany
- Coordinates: 47°35′51″N 2°50′36″W
- Country: France
- Region: Brittany
- Department: Morbihan
- Arrondissement: Vannes
- Canton: Vannes-2
- Intercommunality: Golfe du Morbihan - Vannes Agglomération

Government
  - Mayor (2026–32): Christophe Tattevin
- Area^{1}: 3.20 km^{2} (1.24 sq mi)
- Highest elevation: 31 m (102 ft)
- Lowest elevation: −1 m (−3.3 ft)
- Population (2023): 630
  - Density: 200/km^{2} (510/sq mi)
- Time zone: UTC+01:00 (CET)
  - Summer (DST): UTC+02:00 (CEST)
- INSEE/Postal code: 56087 /56780
- ^{1} French Land Register data, which excludes lakes, ponds, glaciers > 1 km^{2} (0.386 sq mi or 247 acres) and river estuaries.

Île-aux-Moines (French pronunciation: [il o mwan] ; Breton: Enizenac’h, more commonly Izenah) is a commune in the Morbihan department in the region of Brittany in northwestern France.

It comprises the island of Île-aux-Moines – the largest island in the Gulf of Morbihan — along with the islands of Creïzic, Holavre, and the two Brouël islets.

== Geography ==
Île-aux-Moines is located in the Gulf of Morbihan. It measures about 7 km (4.3 mi) in length and 3.5 km (2.2 mi) in width, with a surface area of 3.2 square kilometres (320 ha). The island's outline resembles an irregular cross, and no point lies more than 450 meters from the sea.

The four "arms" of the cross end at:

- Pointe du Trec’h (north branch)
- Pointe du Nioul (south branch, the longest)
- Pointe de Brouël (eastern branch)
- Pointe de Toulindac (western branch, the smallest, home to the island’s port)

The bays between the arms are named:

- Anse du Lério (northwest)
- Anse du Guéric (northeast)
- Anse du Vran (southeast, both the Guéric and Vran bays are large and host oyster farms)

The main village is located at the intersection of the four branches. The small Anse du Guip, in the southeast, is home to the Chantier du Guip shipyard, specializing in the restoration and construction of traditional wooden boats, fishing vessels, and yachts. The company has expanded to Brest (its main base today) and Lorient.

The island’s terrain is relatively hilly, reaching 31 meters between Kerscot and Kergonan, 20–26 meters on the narrow Trec’h peninsula to the north, and 22 meters on the Penhap peninsula to the south,. The eastern Brouël peninsula is lower, never exceeding 14 meters in height, with much of it only a few meters above sea level.

The island has several beaches, including the Drehen beach (also called Grande Plage), Port Miquel beach, and the Goret beach — named after its historic gored (a Breton term for a fish weir), still partly visible at low tide.

The narrowness of the island means there is no significant hydrographic network. The bedrock is primarily granite, historically quarried for construction in nearby Vannes.

Dependent islets include Creïzic (southwest), Holavre (northeast), and the two Brouël islets. Today, they are uninhabited, although Creïzic was once settled.

== History ==
=== Prehistory and Antiquity ===
Île-aux-Moines has been inhabited since the Neolithic period, as evidenced by the still-visible dolmens and other remains.

The first recorded mention of the Kergonan cromlech dates from 1827; it was listed as a historic monument in 1862. Of the 36 menhirs counted in 1877, 24 remain today. They now form an enclosure in the shape of a horseshoe (96 m wide and 70 m deep). The largest of them is nicknamed Le Moine, due to its resemblance to a monk. In 1923, Zacharie Le Rouzic noted that one of the menhirs bears a carved axe.

In 1929, René Merlet demonstrated that the Kergonan cromlech forms a set with that of Er Lannic: for an observer standing on Er Lannic at the summer solstice, the sun rises precisely along a line passing through the tip of one of Kergonan’s menhirs (incorporated into a house since 1825) and the center of the ellipse formed by the cromlech.

Two passage-grave dolmens are located at Kerno and Penhap; two small dolmens stand side by side at Pen Nioul. In 1889, Benjamin Girard wrote that at Penhap, "less than half a century ago (…) one could see a line of tumuli, the easternmost of which was topped by a menhir. This row of burial mounds was preceded by a very fine dolmen. (…) The tumuli have been levelled, the menhir used to close off the entrance to a field; only the dolmen remains."

Traces of occupation from the Gallo-Roman period have also been discovered in the village.

=== Middle Ages ===
Like its mother parish of Arradon, Île-aux-Moines was originally part of the parish of Ploeren.

The first written mention of the island appears in the Redon Cartulary, in connection with a donation made by Erispoë, King of Brittany, to the Abbey of Saint-Sauveur de Redon. In 1904, at Kerscot, a small iron box hidden in a dry-stone wall was discovered, containing coins from the reign of Louis the Pious (Louis le Débonnaire, d. 840).

Between July 851 and 28 September 855, Erispoë granted this parish to Conwoïon, founder of the Abbey of Saint-Sauveur de Redon (established by Erispoë’s father, Nominoë). The charter records that Erispoë gave "the parish called Chaer, with its dependent holdings and their tenants — namely Avaellon, Clides and Villata — with its vineyards and meadows, and the island called Crialeis, that is to say Enesmanac, in fief to the monks of the Abbey of Saint-Sauveur, as an alms for the salvation of his soul and for the reign of God.”

After the Viking raids of the 10th century, the island was attached to the parish of Arradon.

=== Modern Era ===
In 1543, Île-aux-Moines was established as a trève (a subordinate parish district) under the Trève de Saint-Michel, dependent on the parish of Arradon. In the 16th century, baptismal fonts were installed in the Saint-Michel chapel, so that island residents no longer had to travel to Arradon for baptisms.

The Guéric manor is first mentioned in 1532, when it belonged to Olivier d’Arradon and his wife Louise de Quélen. In 1669, Henry Daviers purchased the manor, then known as Manoir Sainte-Anne. According to A. Mreville and P. Varin, an Irish family who had emigrated to France during the exile of James II (probably following the Battle of the Boyne in 1690) built a country house there, bringing with them two statues of the Virgin Mary – one of which is still in the Guéric chapel, the other having been taken to Hennebont. The present château was reportedly built by the Guillo du Bodan family at the end of the 18th century.

=== French Revolution ===
In 1792, Île-aux-Moines became an official commune under the francized name Isle-aux-Moines. During the French Revolution, the commune temporarily bore the name Isle-du-Morbihan.

=== 19th Century ===
The parish church of Saint-Michel was built in 1802 and subsequently enlarged three times—in 1871, 1902, and 1931.

A decree of 1829 mandated that pilots from Locmariaquer and Port-Navalo take turns guiding ships into the Gulf of Morbihan, while pilots from Île-aux-Moines and Île-d'Arz would alternate in guiding vessels out.

In 1843, A. Marteville and P. Varin, described Île-aux-Moines as follows:

“Île-aux-Moines (under the invocation of Saint Michel) is a commune formed from the former trève of Arradon, now a subsidiary parish; it has a maritime guild and customs authority lieutenancy. Main villages include Penhap, Corniguel, Le Reste, Grahic, Kergonan, Grohel, Kerbosec, Grin-Huel, and Guern-Hué. The total area is 315 hectares, including arable land (138 ha), meadows and pastures (65 ha), orchards and gardens (3 ha), ponds and watering holes (4 ha), and moorland and uncultivated land (85 ha). The island, called Izénah in Breton, is divided into three parts: Creïzic to the west, Holavre, and the island itself. This island is the most beautiful among all those in Morbihan; its coasts are varied, sometimes wild, sometimes lush, as are its hills and valleys. Its homes radiate comfort and happiness. The village, located in the northern part of the island, is an irregular cluster of houses; the center is called Luruec; the northern part is Bundo; the southern part is Guergantelec. To the northwest is the port, named Lerio, a well-sheltered harbor. The church is modern, the tower dating to 1836. The island’s soil is generally shallow and rests on granite, which emerges here and there and is prized by builders. Breton is spoken here, in the Vannes dialect."

Citing Amédée de Francheville, the authors add that the island's principal production is wheat, with cultivation also of flax, hemp, millet, and vegetables. Some vineyards produce a low-quality white wine. Most men are sailors, and there were 93 ships registered, including 7 three-masters, 17 brigs, 3 schooners, 10 luggers, and 56 chasse-marées, many built in the shipyards at the port of Lerio.

The island once held a "marriage fair" on a Sunday afternoon on the port jetty, where young sailors would watch girls dressed in their finest traditional costumes and aprons walking by, often summoning the courage to approach one they liked.

In 1887, royalist delegations from Vannes, Arradon, Plescop, Sarzeau, Theix, Île-aux-Moines, and Saint-Avé traveled to Jersey to meet the exiled Count of Paris.

In 1888, the newspaper Le Constitutionnel referenced a brochure by Dr. J.-J. Mauricet, who practiced medicine on the island for about fifty years. He described the Pardon of Saint-Michel, a religious festival gathering all families and clergy dignitaries, ending with meals featuring a traditional cake called fard. Many children were orphans of their fathers, but the ocean's lure remained strong for the sons, who were raised by exemplary women—mostly dressed in black due to mourning.

A prefectural decree in 1888 secularized the island's boys’ school formerly run by a religious congregation.

In 1889, Benjamin Girard noted that the population was generally prosperous; most men were sailors, and the island produced many captains for long voyages and masters for coastal shipping.

=== 20th Century ===
==== The Belle Époque ====
In 1901, Dr. Motel from Arradon requested a special fee for his visits to Île-aux-Moines due to the delays caused by water transit and limited communication means on the island.

In 1912, Charles Géniaux described the island as "wonderful with its sunken paths, poplars trembling by the meadows, and picturesque trails laid out freely by the inhabitants, who built without regard for straight lines." He called it "the island of women," as the men were often away at sea. He also praised the island's meticulous cleanliness: “Its ground is kept like the deck of a warship, and its houses freshly whitewashed."

==== World War I ====
Île-aux-Moines war memorial lists the names of 26 sailors and soldiers who died for France. A commemorative plaque inside the parish church carries these names.

==== Interwar Period ====
In 1918, islanders complained about their precarious connection with the mainland. They argued that the steamship linking Île-aux-Moines to Vannes did not carry horses or horned cattle, making it impossible for the island's 20 farms (covering 400 to 500 hectares) to trade these animals. They requested restoration of a ferry service between Pointe du Tréch and Pointe d’Arradon, formerly provided by a boatman with a sturdy, wide boat.

In 1924, the first "Queen of the Islands" and two attendants were elected on Île-aux-Moines. The same year, plans were made to widen the landing slipway at Toul-in-Dag (Toulindac) because the high number of passengers and goods made the existing facilities inadequate; work began in 1926.

==== World War II ====
The war memorial commemorates 20 people from Île-aux-Moines who died for France during the Second World War (the church plaque lists 22 names). Among them were two Jewish refugees who had settled on the island and were victims of the Shoah, sailors, and members of the Resistance.

During the Occupation, islanders hid Jewish families, saving five children. In 1943, four adults were arrested, two of whom died in deportation. Between 2022 and 2024, an investigation by a journalist from Ouest-France helped restore this memory. In the same year, five golden stolpersteine (commemorative paving stones) were officially installed on the island's port in remembrance of these deportations.

== Demographics ==
Inhabitants of Île-aux-Moines are called Ilois.

== See also ==
- Communes of the Morbihan department
