= Saint-Armel =

Saint-Armel is the name of several communes in France:

- Saint-Armel, in the Ille-et-Vilaine department
- Saint-Armel, in the Morbihan department

== See also ==
- Saint Armel
