= Jane Noria =

American opera singer

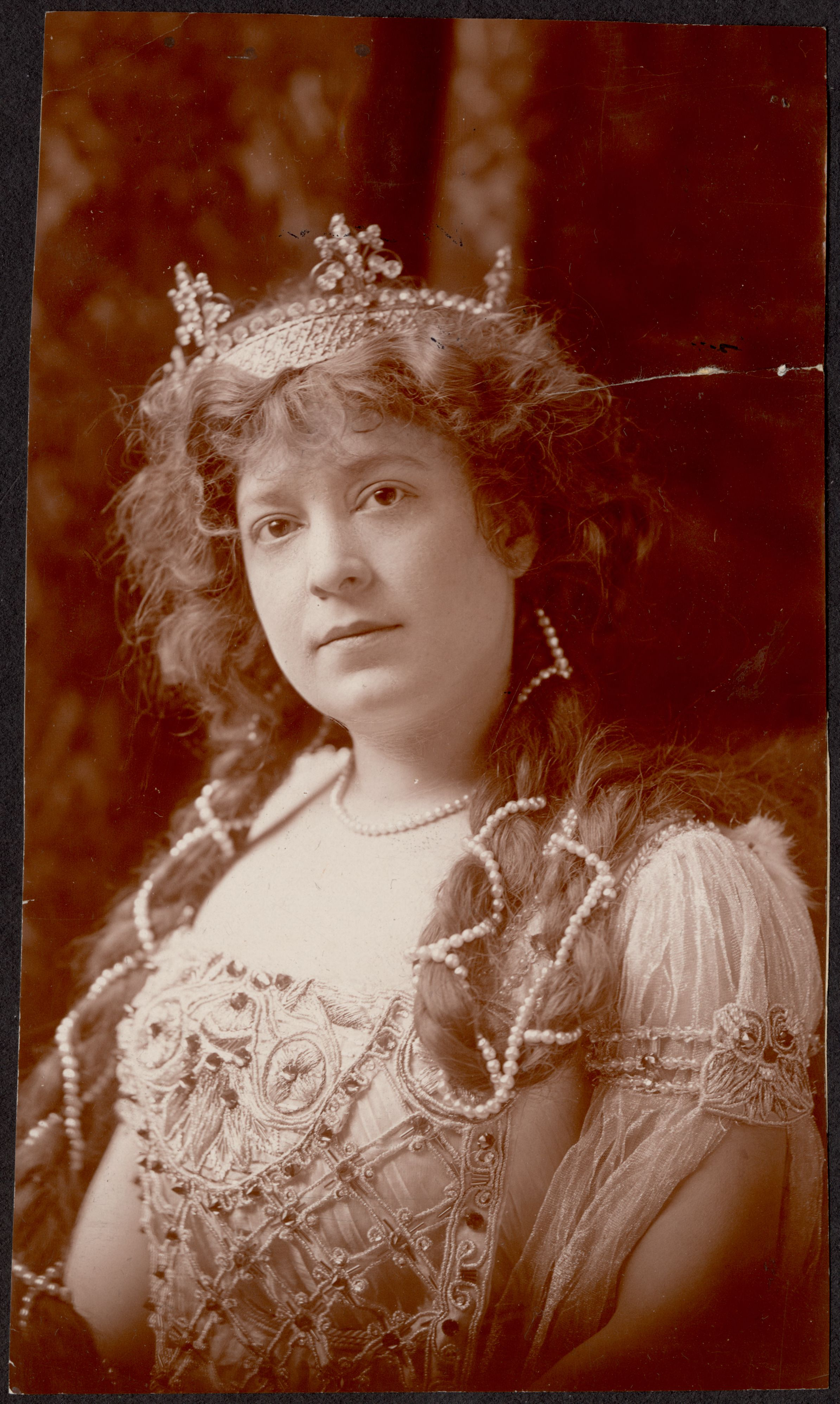
- Noria in 1900
- Born: St. Louis, Missouri
- Died: March 31, 1924; Île-aux-Moines, France
- Occupation: Opera singer
- Spouse(s): Charles H. Becker, Gino Centanini

Jane Noria, born Josephine Ludwig (died 31 March 1924), was an American opera singer.

== Career ==
Jane Noria's career began in the United States, as a member of Savage's Castle Square Opera Company in St. Louis, Missouri. In 1903, she made her debut in Paris as Juliet in Romeo et Juliette. In 1909 and 1910, she joined the touring ensemble of the Metropolitan Opera, performing in a variety of roles around the eastern United States.

== Personal life ==
Noria was married to Charles H. Becker, the Secretary of the American Chamber of Commerce at the time. After Becker's death, she married Gino Centanini, the secretary of Giulio Gatti-Casazza.
