= Larmor-Baden =

Commune in Brittany, France

Larmor-Baden An Arvor-Baden
- Commune
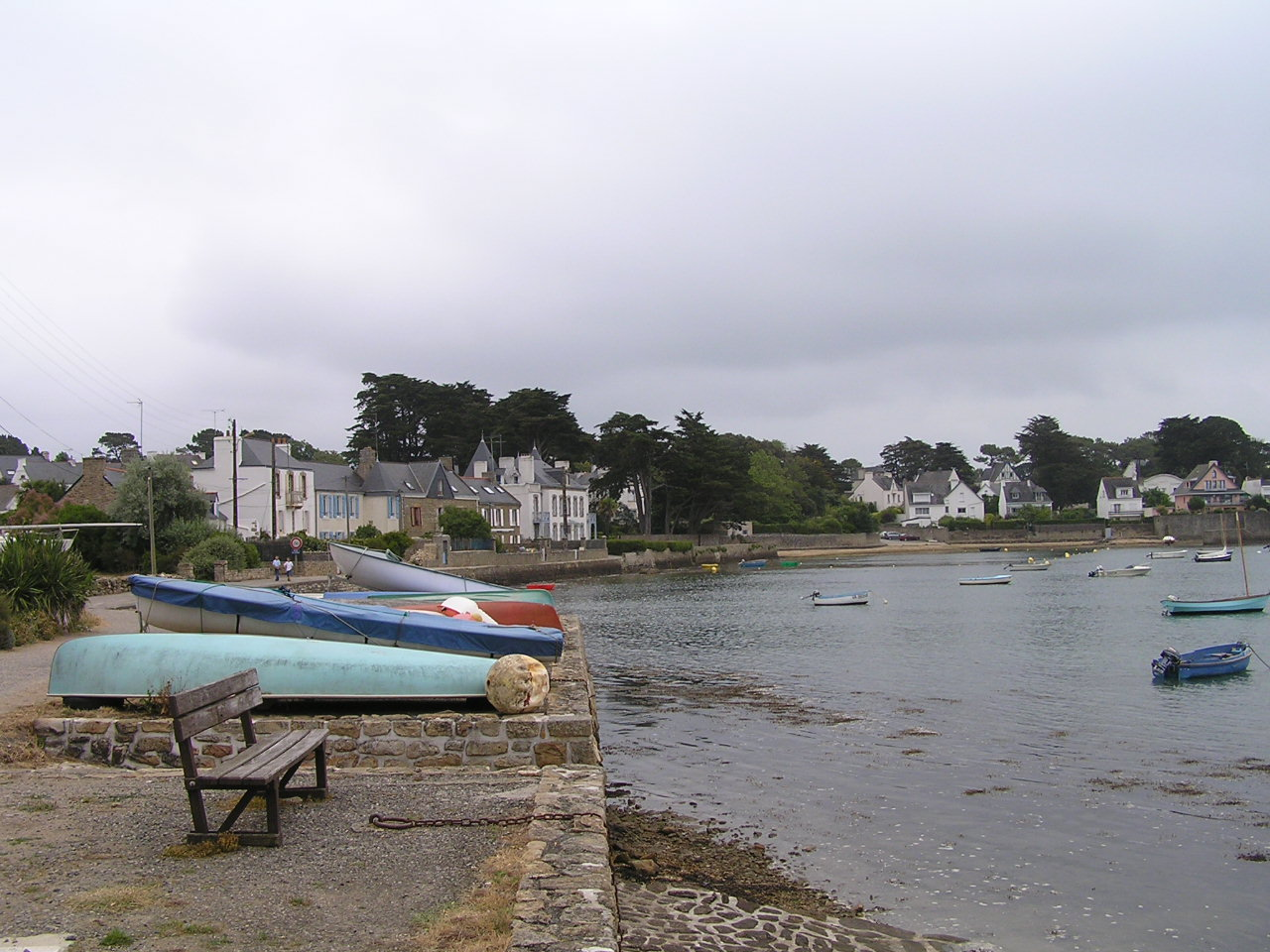
- A view of the bay of Port Lagaden

- Coat of arms
- Location of Larmor-Baden
- Location within France Location within Brittany
- Coordinates: 47°35′16″N 2°53′45″W
- Country: France
- Region: Brittany
- Department: Morbihan
- Arrondissement: Vannes
- Canton: Vannes-2
- Intercommunality: Golfe du Morbihan - Vannes Agglomération

Government
  - Mayor (2026–32): Claire Brabec
- Area^{1}: 3.93 km^{2} (1.52 sq mi)
- Highest elevation: 26 m (85 ft)
- Lowest elevation: 0 m (0 ft)
- Population (2023): 917
  - Density: 233/km^{2} (604/sq mi)
- Time zone: UTC+01:00 (CET)
  - Summer (DST): UTC+02:00 (CEST)
- INSEE/Postal code: 56106 /56870
- ^{1} French Land Register data, which excludes lakes, ponds, glaciers > 1 km^{2} (0.386 sq mi or 247 acres) and river estuaries.

Larmor-Baden (French pronunciation: [laʁmɔʁ badɛn]; Breton: An Arvor-Baden) is a commune in the Morbihan department of Brittany in northwestern France. The inhabitants of Larmor-Baden are called in French Larmoriens.

== Île de Berder ==
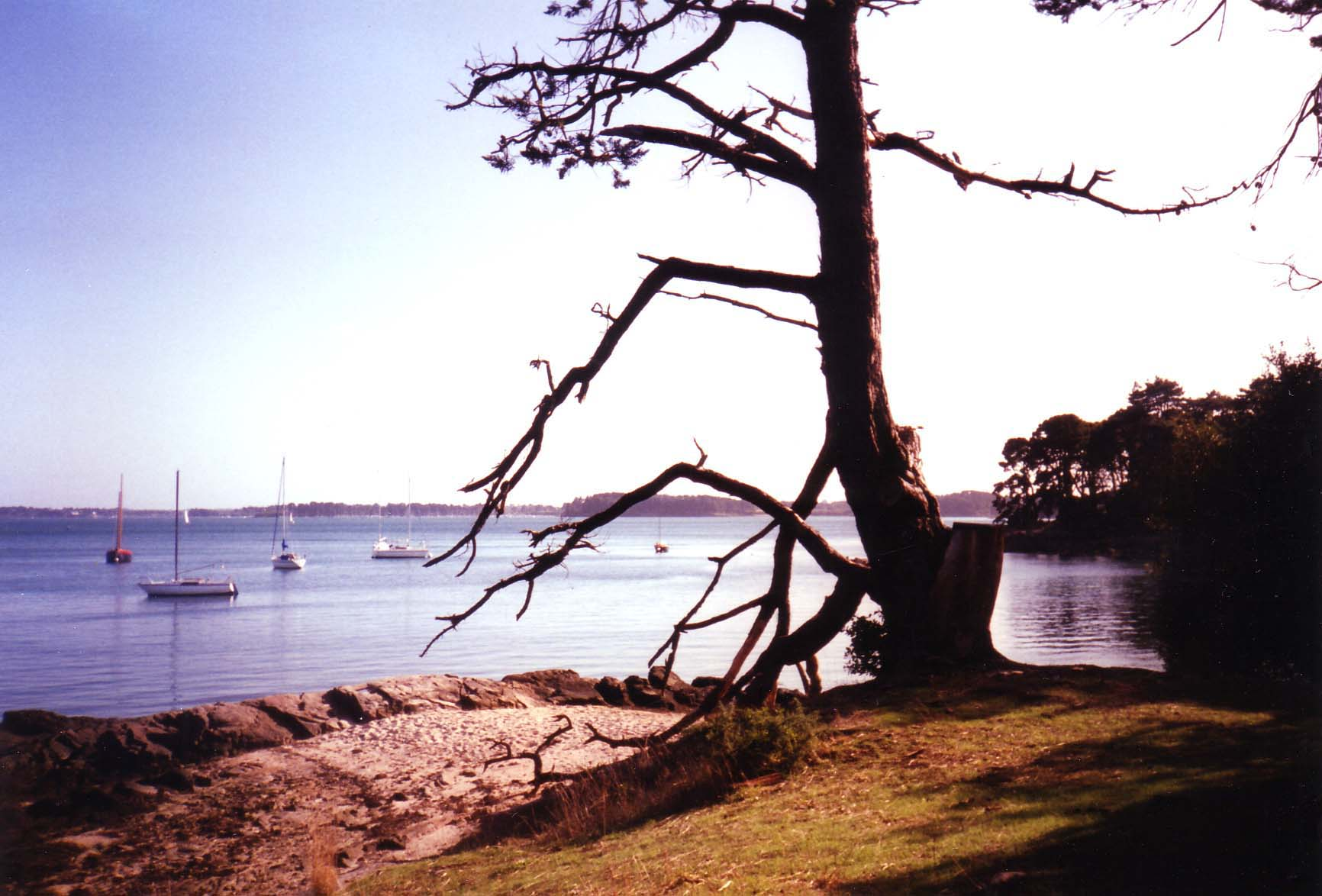
Île Berder in the Gulf of Morbihan.

Île de Berder (French for "The Island of Berder") is a small island off Larmor-Baden. In reality Berder is not a true island as it is attached to the mainland by submerged land that shows at low tide. The name Berder comes from the Breton word Breudeur, meaning brothers.

The island lies in the Gulf of Morbihan, and has a position relative to other islands:

- south of Port-Blanc
- north of île de la Jument
- west of île aux Moines
- east of île Longue and the mainland (Larmor-Baden).

== See also ==
- Gavrinis
- Communes of the Morbihan department
