= Golfe du Morbihan - Vannes Agglomération =

Coordinates: 47.66°N 2.76°W

- Communauté d'agglomération
- Country: France
- Region: Brittany
- Department: Morbihan
- No. of communes: {{{nbcomm}}}
- Established: 2017
- Area: 807.4 km^{2} (311.7 sq mi)
- Population (2018): 169,785
  - Density: 210.3/km^{2} (544.6/sq mi)

Golfe du Morbihan - Vannes Agglomération is the communauté d'agglomération, an intercommunal structure, centred on the city of Vannes. It is located in the Morbihan department, in the Brittany region, northwestern France. It was created in January 2017 by the merger of the former Communauté d'agglomération Vannes Agglo with the former communautés de communes Loc'h Communauté and Presqu'île de Rhuys. Its area is 807.4 km^{2}. Its population was 169,785 in 2018, of which 53,438 in Vannes proper.

== Composition ==
The communauté d'agglomération consists of the following 34 communes:

1. Arradon
2. Arzon
3. Baden
4. Bono
5. Brandivy
6. Colpo
7. Elven
8. Grand-Champ
9. Le Hézo
10. Île-aux-Moines
11. Île-d'Arz
12. Larmor-Baden
13. Locmaria-Grand-Champ
14. Locqueltas
15. Meucon
16. Monterblanc
17. Plaudren
18. Plescop
19. Ploeren
20. Plougoumelen
21. Saint-Armel
22. Saint-Avé
23. Saint-Gildas-de-Rhuys
24. Saint-Nolff
25. Sarzeau
26. Séné
27. Sulniac
28. Surzur
29. Theix-Noyalo
30. Le Tour-du-Parc
31. Trédion
32. Treffléan
33. La Trinité-Surzur
34. Vannes
