= Île-d'Arz =

Commune in Brittany, France

Île-d'Arz An Arzh
- Commune
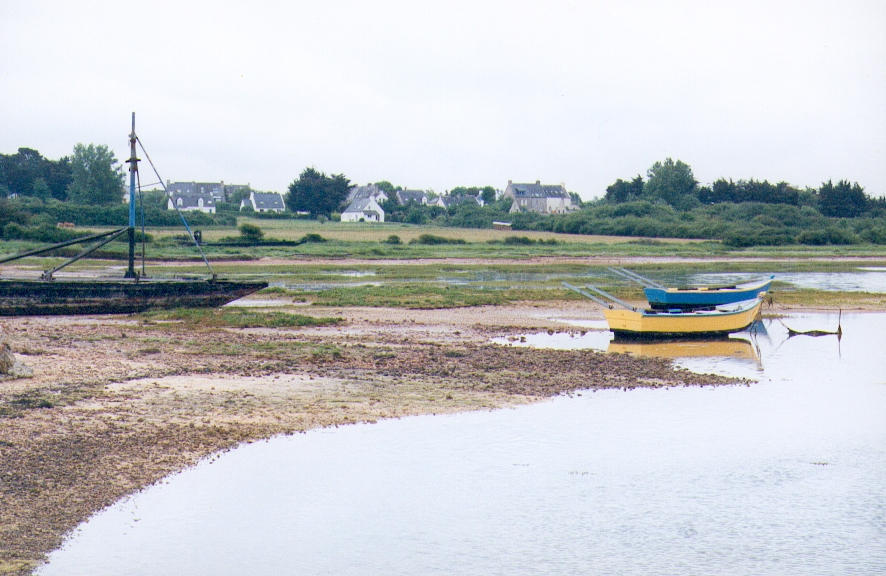
- The shore of the Île-d'Arz

- Coat of arms
- Location of Île-d'Arz
- Location within France Location within Brittany
- Coordinates: 47°35′27″N 2°48′05″W
- Country: France
- Region: Brittany
- Department: Morbihan
- Arrondissement: Vannes
- Canton: Vannes-2
- Intercommunality: Golfe du Morbihan - Vannes Agglomération

Government
  - Mayor (2026–32): Hervé Le Bourdiec
- Area^{1}: 3.3 km^{2} (1.3 sq mi)
- Elevation: 25 m (82 ft)
- Highest elevation: 17 m (56 ft)
- Lowest elevation: 0 m (0 ft)
- Population (2023): 321
  - Density: 97/km^{2} (250/sq mi)
- Time zone: UTC+01:00 (CET)
  - Summer (DST): UTC+02:00 (CEST)
- INSEE/Postal code: 56088 /56840
- ^{1} French Land Register data, which excludes lakes, ponds, glaciers > 1 km^{2} (0.386 sq mi or 247 acres) and river estuaries.

Île-d'Arz (French pronunciation: [il daʁ]; Breton: An Arzh, pronounced [ãnars]) is an archipelago of nine islands and a commune in the Morbihan department, Brittany, northwestern France, only 6 kilometres (3.7 miles) to the southwest of Vannes.

It is located in the Gulf of Morbihan. Île d'Arz and Île-aux-Moines are the only two islands of the gulf that are also communes.

== Demographics ==
Inhabitants of Île-d'Arz are called Iledarais.

At the census of 1999, the island had a resident population of 231. On 1 January 2019, the estimate was 221. The population goes as high as 2,500 during summer. The main island contains 550 houses, 30% of which are residential.

== Economy ==
=== Lodging ===
There is one hotel open during the summer on the island and one residential hotel open during the whole year. There are two rural gîtes open the whole year. There is also one campsite which opens during the summer.

=== Artisans ===
There is one mason, one carpenter, one professional painter, and one farmer.

=== Transport ===
There is one bus service between the town and the port, three passenger boats which travel between the archipelago and Vannes and one merchandise ship which follows the same trajectory

== History ==
The main island has been inhabited since 4000 BC. Like other communes in the area, it has been populated by Celts, Vénètes, the Romans and the Bretons who all came for the fertile land the area had to offer. From the 11th century to the French Revolution in 1789, the island was split in two causing considerable tensions, with the northern part administered by the Abbey of St Georges of Rennes and the southern part by the Abbey of St Gildas of Rhuys. The island was mainly composed of farms, mills, two priories and a church. The marine trade and taxes enabled the inhabitants to get resources from the mainland and further develop the island. Since the revolution, the island has had a long tradition of being the home of many sailors and was recently given the nickname of "Island of Captains".

=== Historical monuments ===
==== Notre Dame ====
In 1008, Geoffrey I, Duke of Brittany, died and gave by his will the southern half of the island of Arz to the Abbey of St Gildas de Rhuys. He assigned a few peasants to start developing and cultivating the soil. Construction of the priory of Notre Dame was started in 1034 by monks seconded from the Abbey of St Gildas de Rhuys. Construction of the church of Notre Dame next to the priory was subsequently launched to serve the whole island, and was completed in 1412. In 1514, an agreement further made it official that this church was to fully serve both the southern and northern parts of the island. To this day, regular services are still held in the church. The priory of Notre Dame was acquired and renovated by the municipality in 1970 and now serves as both the town hall and school for the island.

==== KernoeI ====
The site has a long history, starting as a priory and becoming a private manor. In 1032, Alain III, the son of Geoffroy 1st, decided to create his own priory under the governance of the Abbey of St Georges of Rennes. He launched the construction of a female priory in the northern part of the island in the area of Kernoel. The owners of Kernoel from the 11th to the 14th centuries are unknown, but it seems that the abbey of Saint Georges de Rennes sold one of the main building along with some land to a nearby lord. The first document found about an owner of the manor was Antoine Le Hen dating from July 1437. The family kept possession of the site with their descendants, Pierre Le Hen, Hervé Le Hen, Jean Le Hen, Pierre Le Hen who then named his own son Pierre Le Hen. Due to debts, the younger Pierre Le Hen is required to sell Kernoel. In 1628, the family Le Cloerec takes possession of Kernoel, but then also sells it in 1665 to the family Choumin/Touzé du Guernic who will keep possession of it until 1800. Jean-Vincent Touzé du Guernic is the last of this family to own Kernoel. He was born on 7 September 1732 and spent all his childhood on the island. He leaves it to pursue his studies at Vannes, but returns at age 52. After the French revolution he was elected as the first Republican mayor in 1790. By 1795, directly or indirectly, he acquired and consolidated all Kernoel buildings and land from the church. During the post revolutionary terror years, Jean-Vincent struggled to protect the Ile d'Arz from numerous attacks from the Chouans who were sailing from mainland. Writing letters to his fellow Republicans on the continent, he kept requesting help to defend himself and the islanders who did not have their own army. The Chouans mercilessly attacked the island year after year, and eventually kidnapped the mayor in 1800. A few days later, to the grief of much of the island, his corpse was found, mutilated, deformed and almost unrecognizable. In 1823 Kernoel was bought by a priest, Jean-Mathurin Le Gal, and became a seminary, property of the church for the second time. During the first world war it was then owned by the department of Morbihan and sold again as private property in 1926. It became an algae drying factory and a farm until 1976 when it was extensively renovated to become a manor.

==== Berno Mill ====
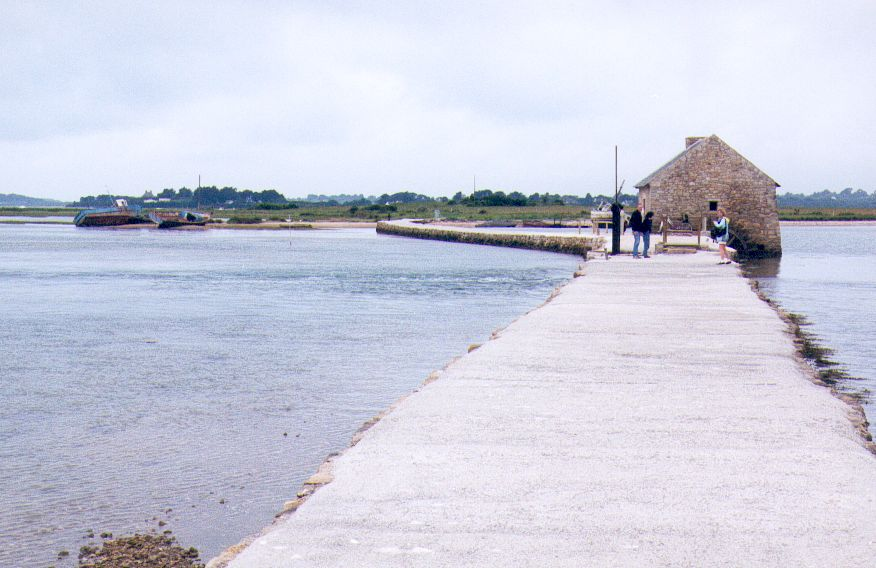
The tide mill and its dike.

The Berno Mill was built under the religious community Saint Gildas de Rhuys who exerted its power in the southern part of the main island. It is a tide mill and was, according to research built around the 13th century. There is no certainty to the exact date which it was built, the oldest document found concerning the mill was dating 1575. The mill kept functioning until 1910. Due to the lack of maintenance, the mill quickly degraded and became a ruin. On 28 November 1994, Jean Bulot, an Iledarais, created an association in order to restore the mill to its previous majestic state. Supported by a handful of volunteers, he managed to complete his project in June 2000.

== See also ==
- Communes of the Morbihan department
