= Le Hézo =

Commune in Brittany, France

Le Hézo Hezoù
- Commune
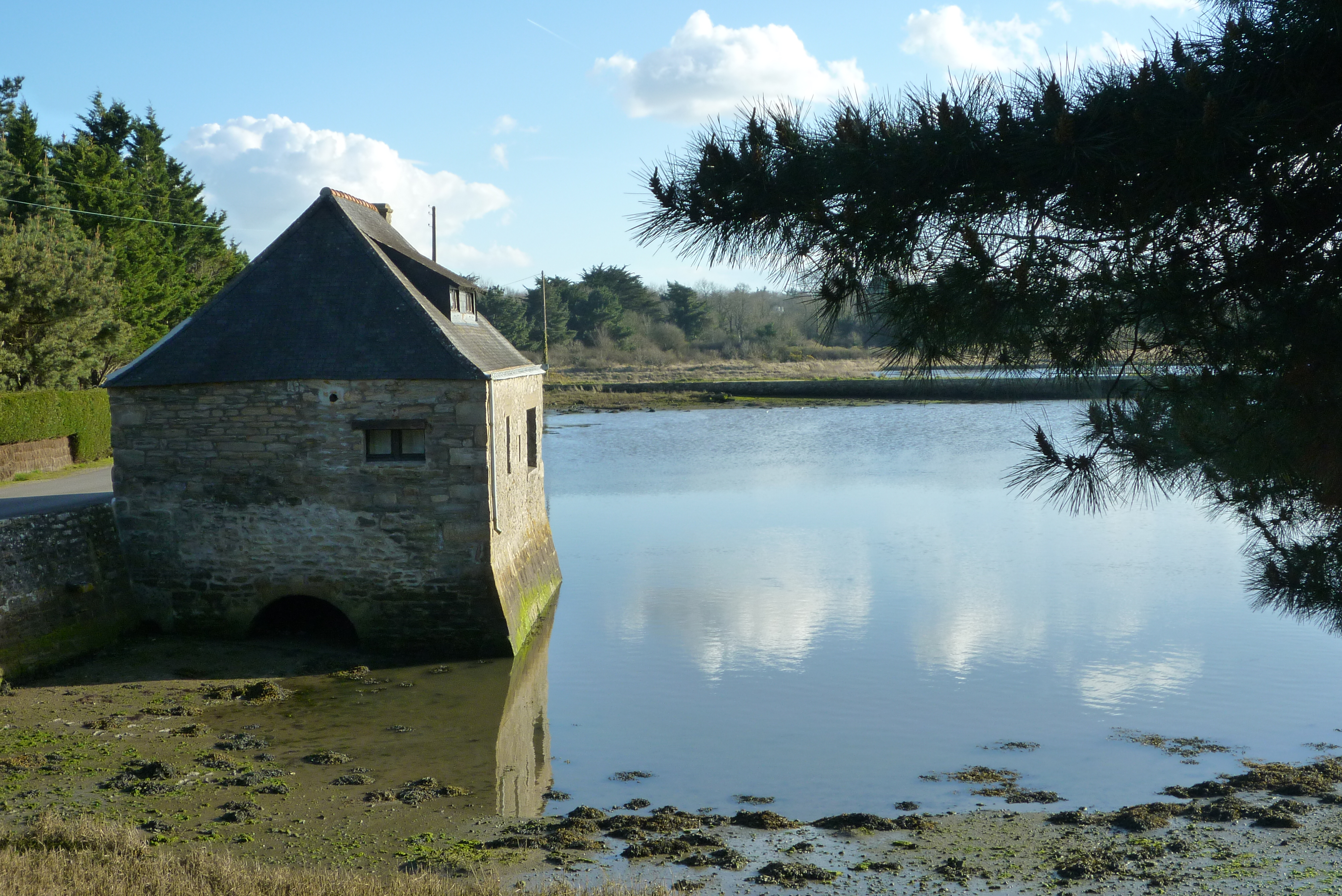
- A tide mill in Le Héro

- Coat of arms
- Location of Le Hézo
- Location within France Location within Brittany
- Coordinates: 47°35′10″N 2°42′09″W
- Country: France
- Region: Brittany
- Department: Morbihan
- Arrondissement: Vannes
- Canton: Séné
- Intercommunality: Golfe du Morbihan - Vannes Agglomération

Government
  - Mayor (2026–32): Philippe Gain
- Area^{1}: 4.89 km^{2} (1.89 sq mi)
- Highest elevation: 38 m (125 ft)
- Lowest elevation: −1 m (−3.3 ft)
- Population (2023): 930
  - Density: 190/km^{2} (490/sq mi)
- Time zone: UTC+01:00 (CET)
  - Summer (DST): UTC+02:00 (CEST)
- INSEE/Postal code: 56084 /56450
- ^{1} French Land Register data, which excludes lakes, ponds, glaciers > 1 km^{2} (0.386 sq mi or 247 acres) and river estuaries.

Le Hézo (French pronunciation: [lə ezo]; Breton: Hezoù) is a commune in the Morbihan department of Brittany in north-western France. Inhabitants of Le Hézo are called in French Hézotins.

== See also ==
- Communes of the Morbihan department
