= Sarzeau =

Sarzeau Sarzhav
- Commune
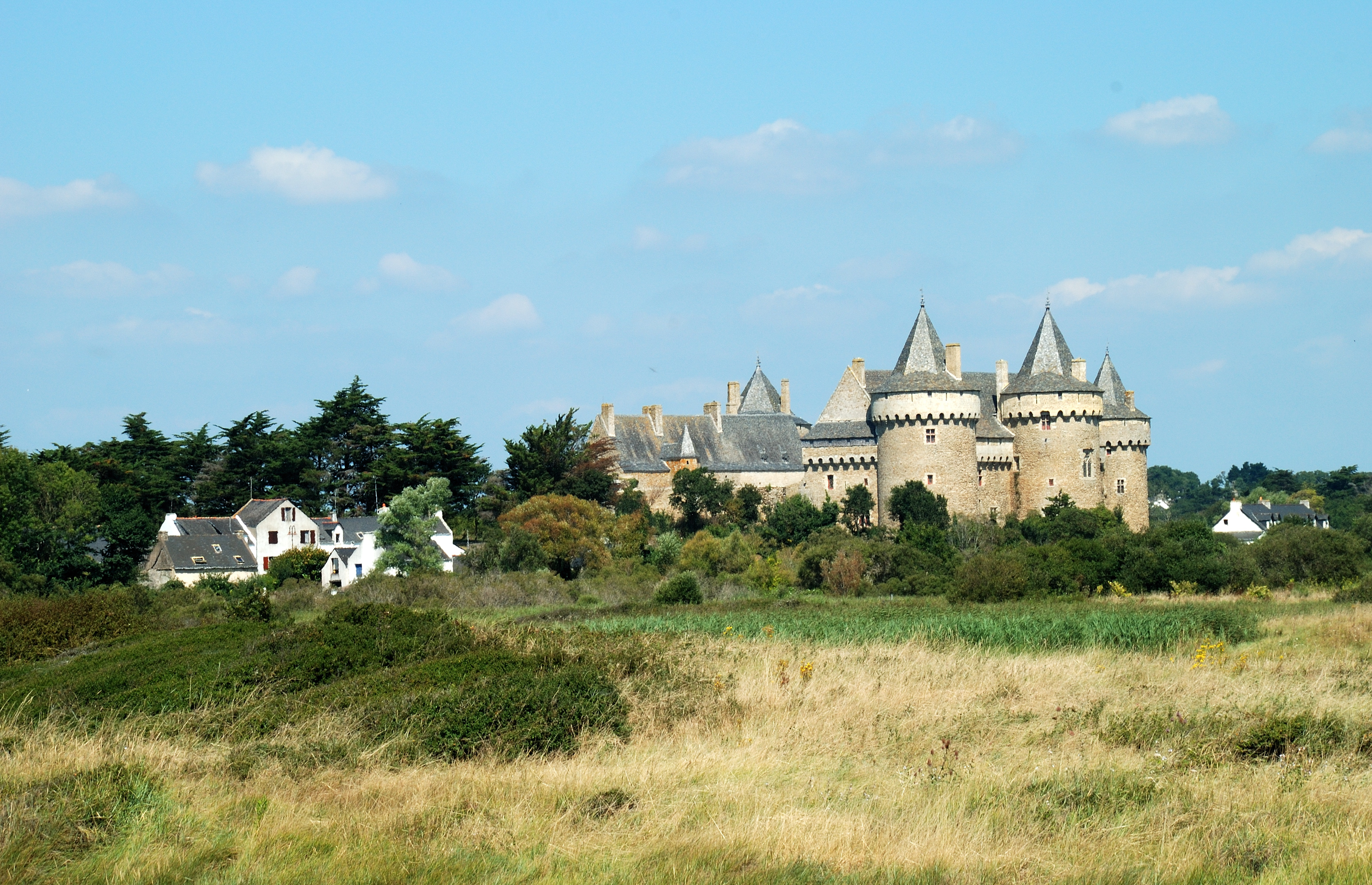
- Suscinio Castle

- Coat of arms
- Location of Sarzeau
- Location within France Location within Brittany
- Coordinates: 47°31′41″N 2°46′07″W
- Country: France
- Region: Brittany
- Department: Morbihan
- Arrondissement: Vannes
- Canton: Séné
- Intercommunality: Golfe du Morbihan - Vannes Agglomération

Government
  - Mayor (2026–32): Jean-Marc Dupeyrat
- Area^{1}: 60.23 km^{2} (23.25 sq mi)
- Highest elevation: 42 m (138 ft)
- Lowest elevation: 0 m (0 ft)
- Population (2023): 9,212
  - Density: 152.9/km^{2} (396.1/sq mi)
- Time zone: UTC+01:00 (CET)
  - Summer (DST): UTC+02:00 (CEST)
- INSEE/Postal code: 56240 /56370
- ^{1} French Land Register data, which excludes lakes, ponds, glaciers > 1 km^{2} (0.386 sq mi or 247 acres) and river estuaries.

Sarzeau (French pronunciation: [saʁzo]; Breton: Sarzhav) is a commune in the Morbihan department of Brittany in north-western France.

It is located on the Rhuys peninsula between the Gulf of Morbihan and the Atlantic Ocean.

== History ==
The area around the Morbihan has been occupied since Neolithic times. Prehistoric monuments remaining include the menhirs of Kermaillard and Largueven, as well as the dolmens of Kergillet and Brillac. The town itself was first mentioned in the 11th century in reference to an abbey at the site . The nearby Château de Suscinio was built in the 13th century and fortified in the 15th century. The castle was a favorite spot of the Dukes of Brittany who often came for the hunting in the surrounding region . During the Middle Ages, because of its size the town was divided into seven local divisions, a situation that still exists to some extent. The town officially became a commune during the French Revolution.

Sarzeau was the birthplace of Alain-René Lesage (1668–1747), the author of novel The Devil upon Two Sticks (1707), his comedy Turcaret (1709) and his picaresque novel Gil Blas, (1715–1735).

The famed tub of Jean-Paul Marat was found in Sarzeau after a lengthy search by Le Figaro in 1885. Following its rediscovery the tub was purchased by the Musée Grévin for 5,000 francs.

== Population ==
Inhabitants of Sarzeau are called in French Sarzeautins.

Historical population
Year	Pop.	±% p.a.
1968	3,676	—
1975	4,088	+1.53%
1982	4,406	+1.08%
1990	4,972	+1.52%
1999	6,143	+2.38%
2007	7,330	+2.23%
2012	7,710	+1.02%
2017	8,182	+1.20%
2023	9,212	+2.00%
Source: INSEE

== Sights ==
- The Château de Suscinio is a 13th-century castle that has recently been restored. Inside there is also a museum on the history of the area.
- The Château de Kerlevenan is an 18th-century castle with large gardens.
- Museum of Arts et Métiers and Cider Museum.
- Menhirs of Kermaillard and Largueven, and the dolmens of Kergillet and Brillac.
- Beaches, especially along the Atlantic side.

== Sport ==
Stage four of the 2018 Tour de France finished in the town.

== Breton language ==
The municipality launched a linguistic plan through Ya d'ar brezhoneg on 20 December 2006.

In 2008, there was 4,59% of the children attended the bilingual schools in primary education.

== See also ==
- Communes of the Morbihan department
