= Baden, Morbihan =

Commune in Brittany, France

Baden
- Commune
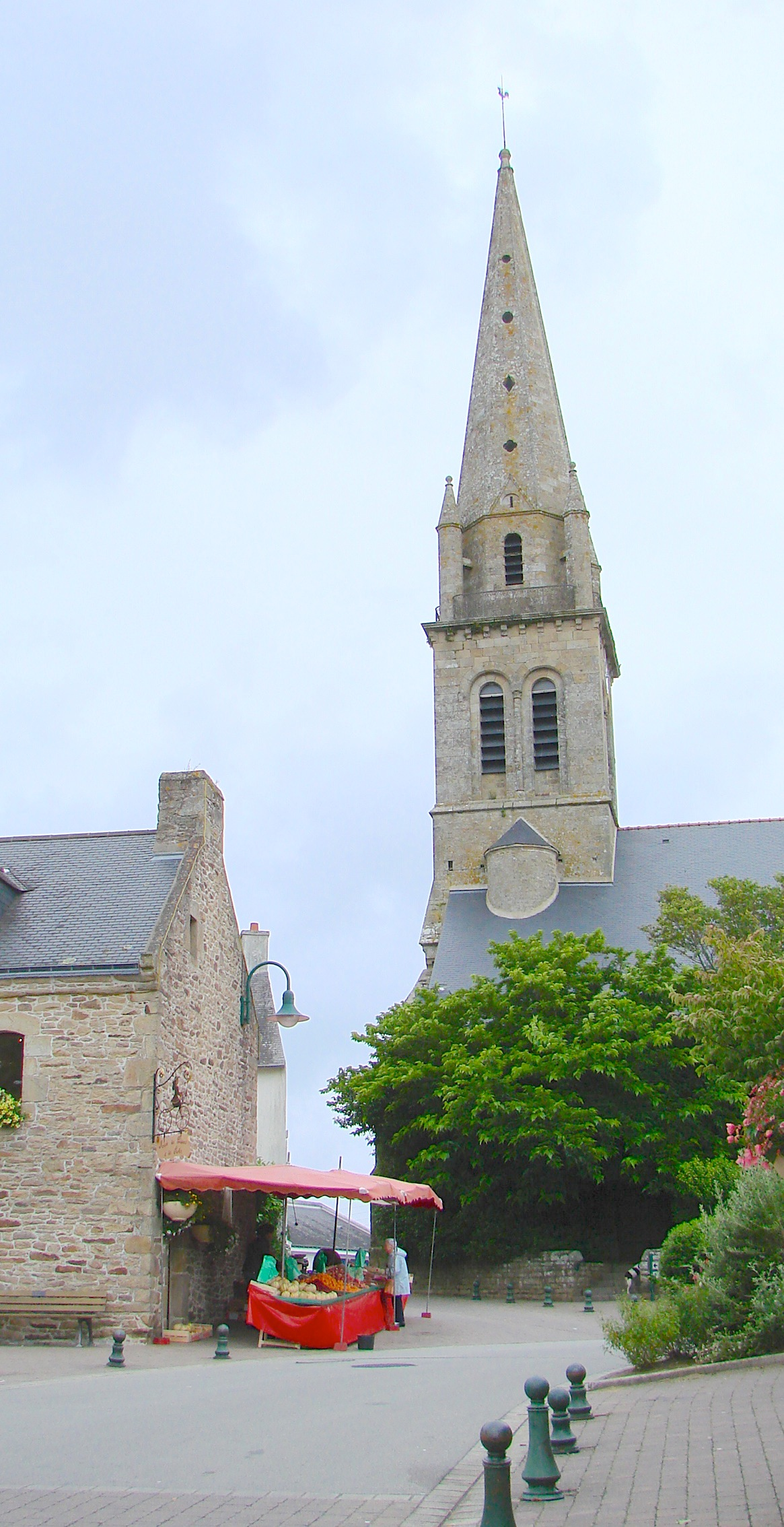
- The church of St. Pierre

- Coat of arms
- Location of Baden
- Location within France Location within Brittany
- Coordinates: 47°37′10″N 2°55′08″W
- Country: France
- Region: Brittany
- Department: Morbihan
- Arrondissement: Vannes
- Canton: Vannes-2
- Intercommunality: Golfe du Morbihan - Vannes Agglomération

Government
  - Mayor (2026–32): Christophe Bédard
- Area^{1}: 23.53 km^{2} (9.08 sq mi)
- Highest elevation: 43 m (141 ft)
- Lowest elevation: −1 m (−3.3 ft)
- Population (2023): 5,086
  - Density: 216.1/km^{2} (559.8/sq mi)
- Time zone: UTC+01:00 (CET)
  - Summer (DST): UTC+02:00 (CEST)
- INSEE/Postal code: 56008 /56870
- ^{1} French Land Register data, which excludes lakes, ponds, glaciers > 1 km^{2} (0.386 sq mi or 247 acres) and river estuaries.

Baden (French pronunciation: [badɛn]; Breton: Baden) is a commune in the Morbihan département in Brittany in northwestern France.

== Geography ==
Some of the islands of the Gulf of Morbihan fall within the boundaries of the commune. The town is located 8 km (5.0 mi) from Auray and 13 km (8.1 mi) from Vannes.

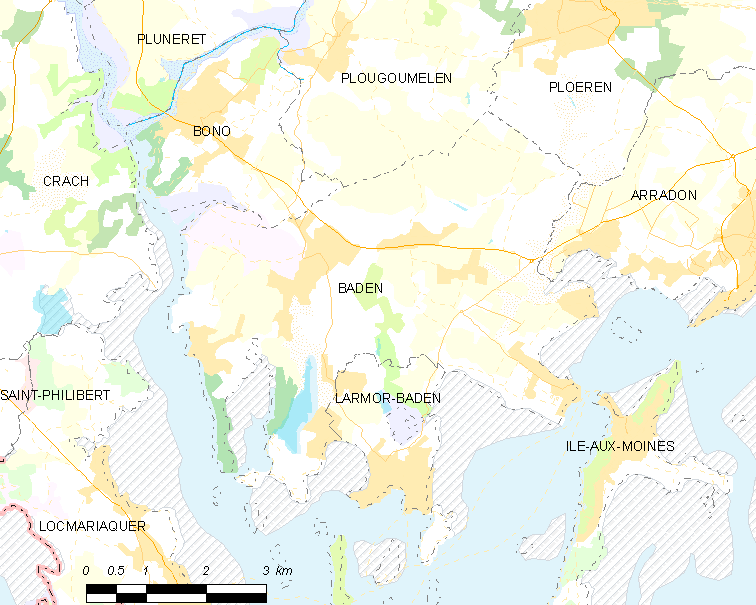
A map of the commune

== Population ==
Historical population
Year	Pop.	±% p.a.
1968	1,844	—
1975	1,957	+0.85%
1982	2,369	+2.77%
1990	2,844	+2.31%
1999	3,360	+1.87%
2007	3,976	+2.13%
2012	4,260	+1.39%
2017	4,340	+0.37%
2023	5,086	+2.68%
Source: INSEE

Inhabitants of Baden are called Badennois in French.

== Museum ==
The Passions and Wings museum is devoted to the story of Joseph Le Brix (aviator), who is from the area, it includes a collection of robots and old toys donated by John and Anne Farkas.

== International Relations ==
The town is twinned with Weilheim in Germany.

== See also ==
- Communes of the Morbihan department
