= Le Bono =

Commune in Brittany, France

Le Bono Ar Bonoù
- Commune
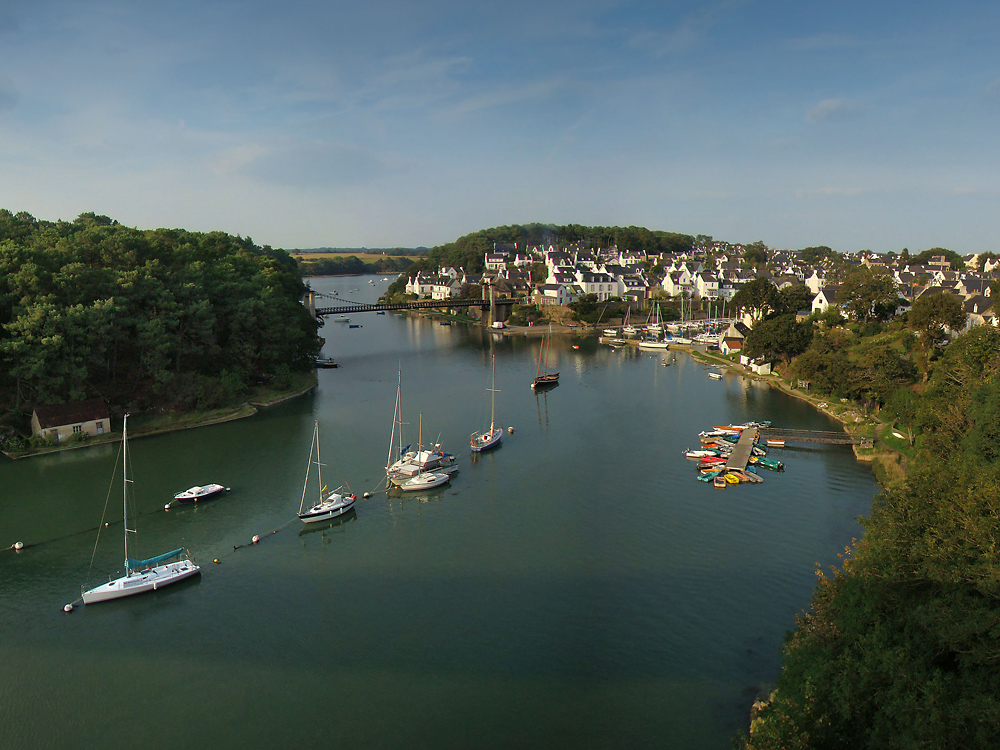
- From the bridge "Joseph Le Brix"
- Location of Le Bono
- Location within France Location within Brittany
- Coordinates: 47°38′28″N 2°56′58″W
- Country: France
- Region: Brittany
- Department: Morbihan
- Arrondissement: Vannes
- Canton: Vannes-2
- Intercommunality: Golfe du Morbihan - Vannes Agglomération

Government
  - Mayor (2026–32): Mickaël Le Mouroux
- Area^{1}: 5.96 km^{2} (2.30 sq mi)
- Highest elevation: 42 m (138 ft)
- Lowest elevation: 0 m (0 ft)
- Population (2023): 2,608
  - Density: 438/km^{2} (1,130/sq mi)
- Time zone: UTC+01:00 (CET)
  - Summer (DST): UTC+02:00 (CEST)
- INSEE/Postal code: 56262 /56400
- ^{1} French Land Register data, which excludes lakes, ponds, glaciers > 1 km^{2} (0.386 sq mi or 247 acres) and river estuaries.

Le Bono (French pronunciation: [lə bɔno]; Breton: Ar Bonoù) is a commune in the Morbihan department of Brittany in northwestern France. The commune was also known as Bono until 31 December 2022.

The town was known popularly as Le Bono before the official name change and this was the name used on the road signs.

== Population ==
Historical population
Year	Pop.	±% p.a.
1968	1,555	—
1975	1,561	+0.06%
1982	1,633	+0.65%
1990	1,747	+0.85%
1999	1,859	+0.69%
2007	2,148	+1.82%
2012	2,124	−0.22%
2017	2,466	+3.03%
2023	2,608	+0.94%
Source: INSEE

Inhabitants of Le Bono are called Bonovistes in French.

== Breton language ==
The municipality launched a linguistic plan through Ya d'ar brezhoneg on 17 November 2008.

== Gallery ==
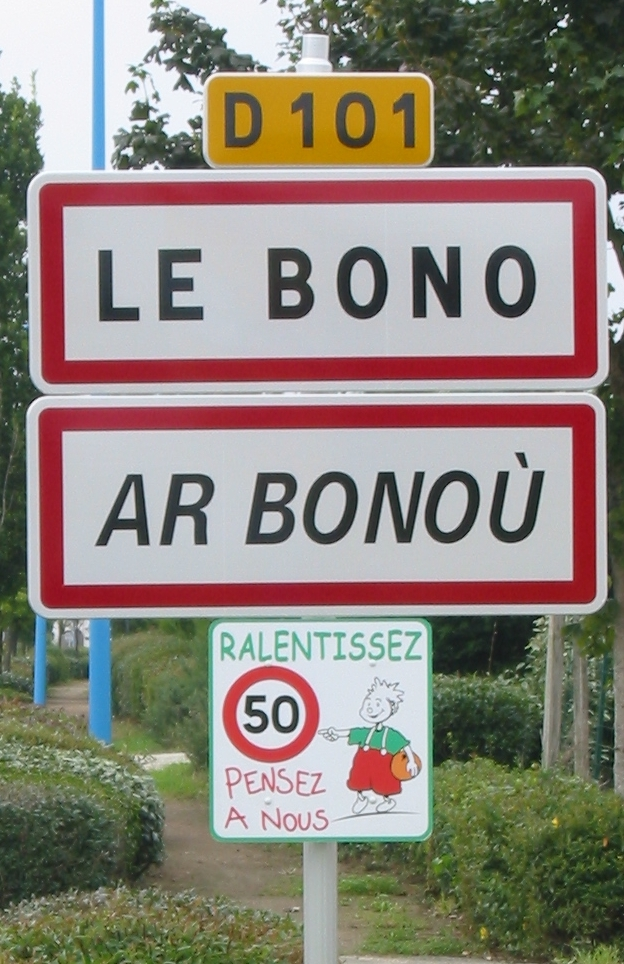

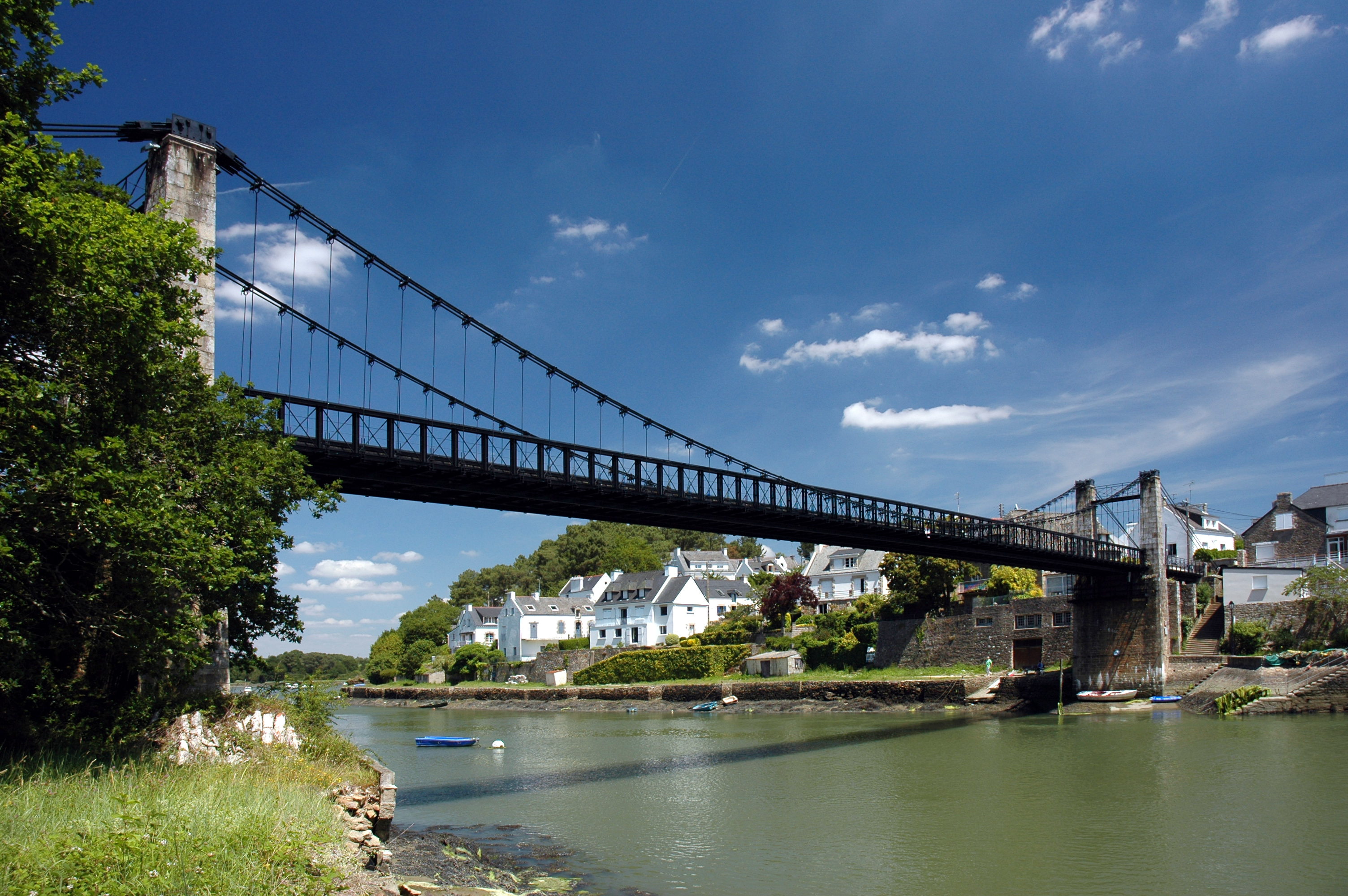

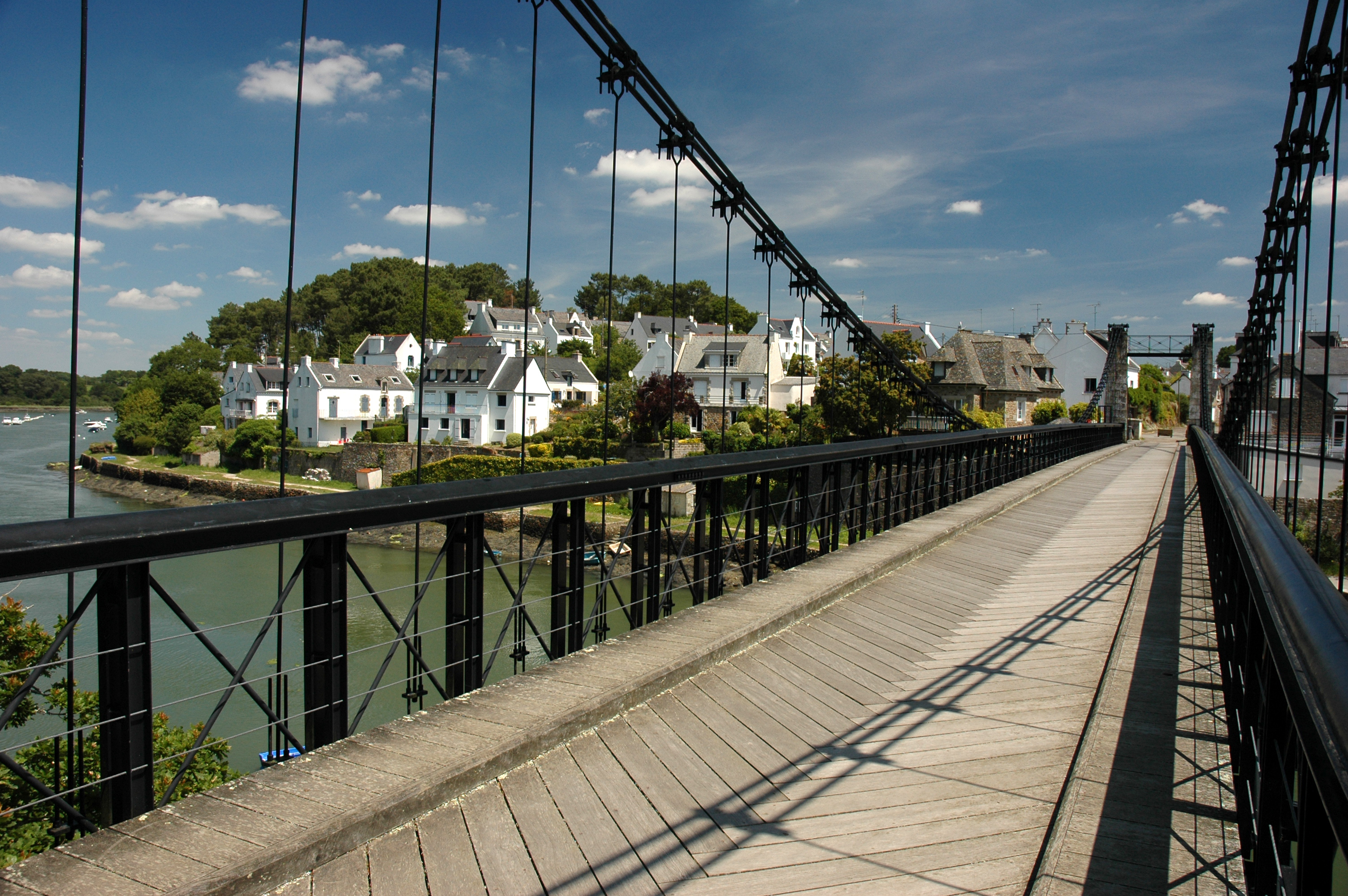

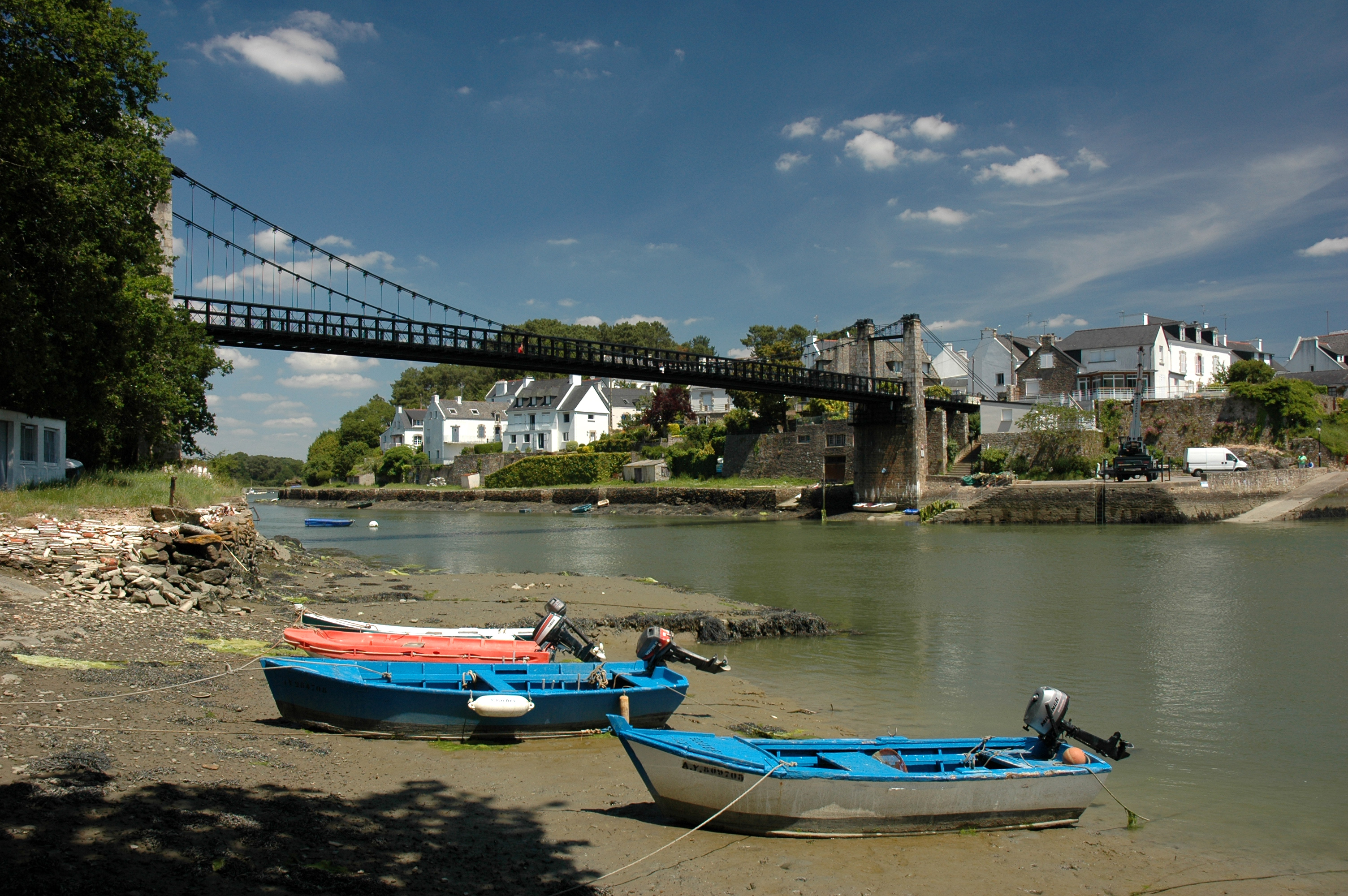

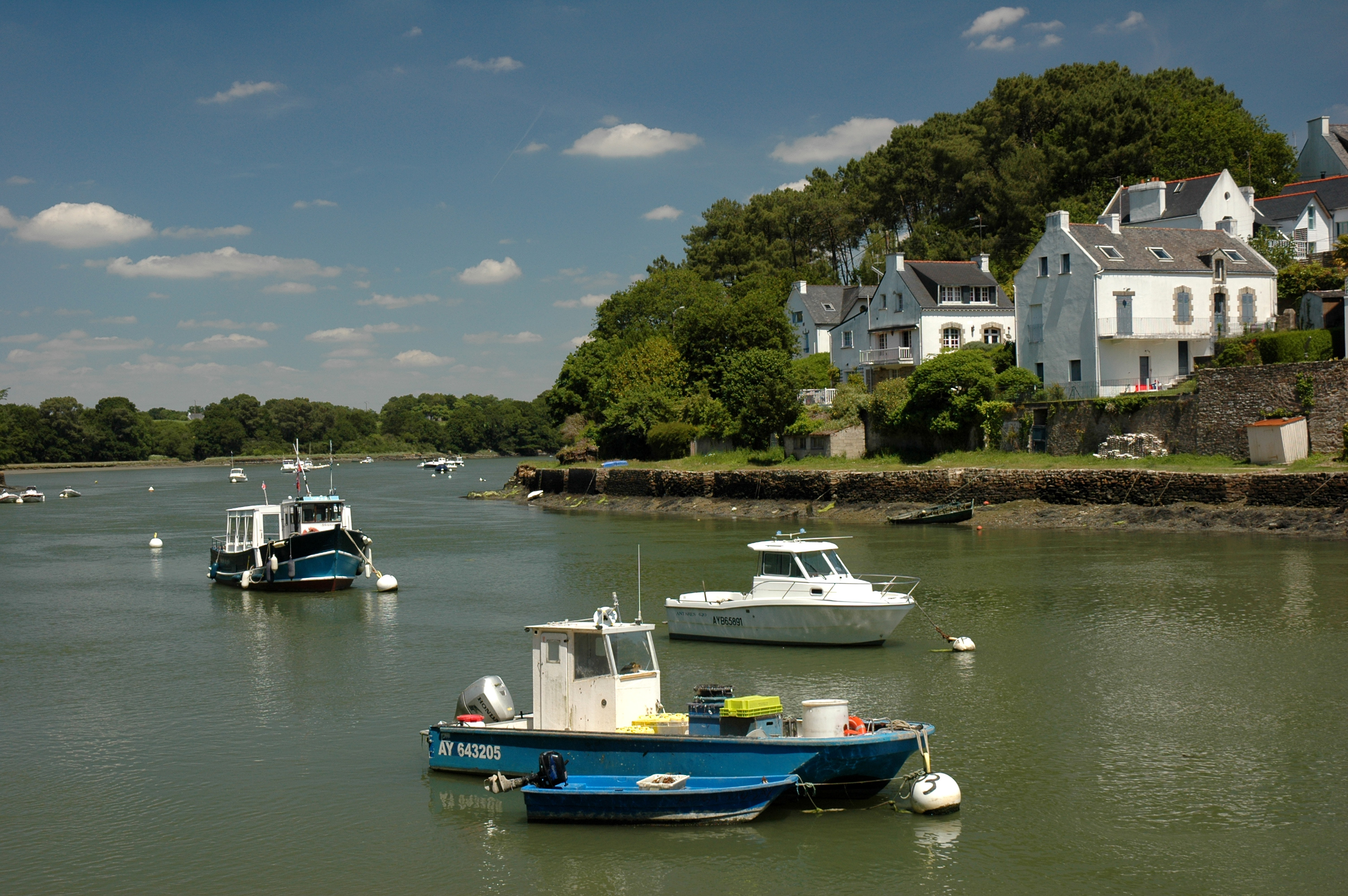

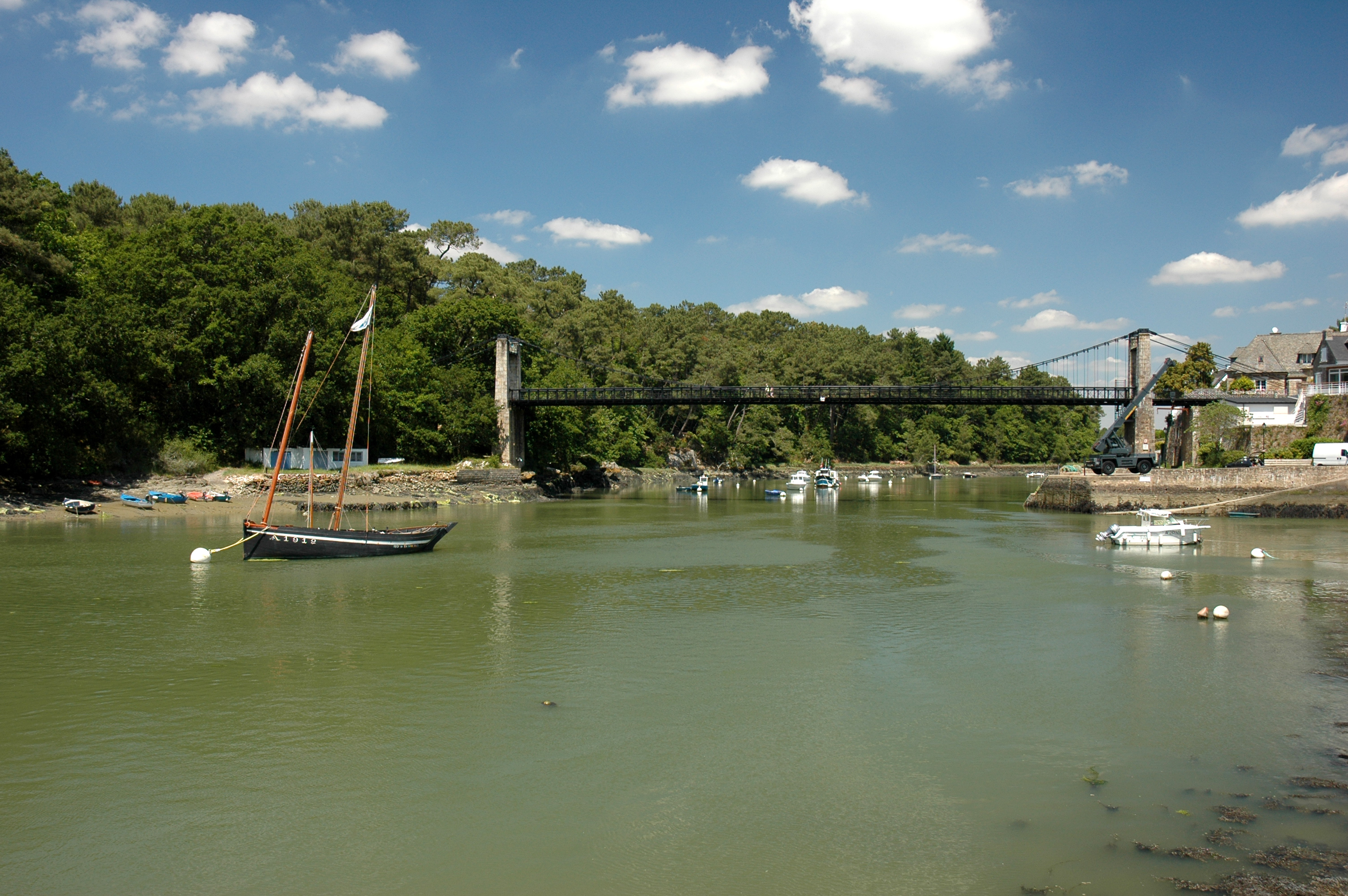

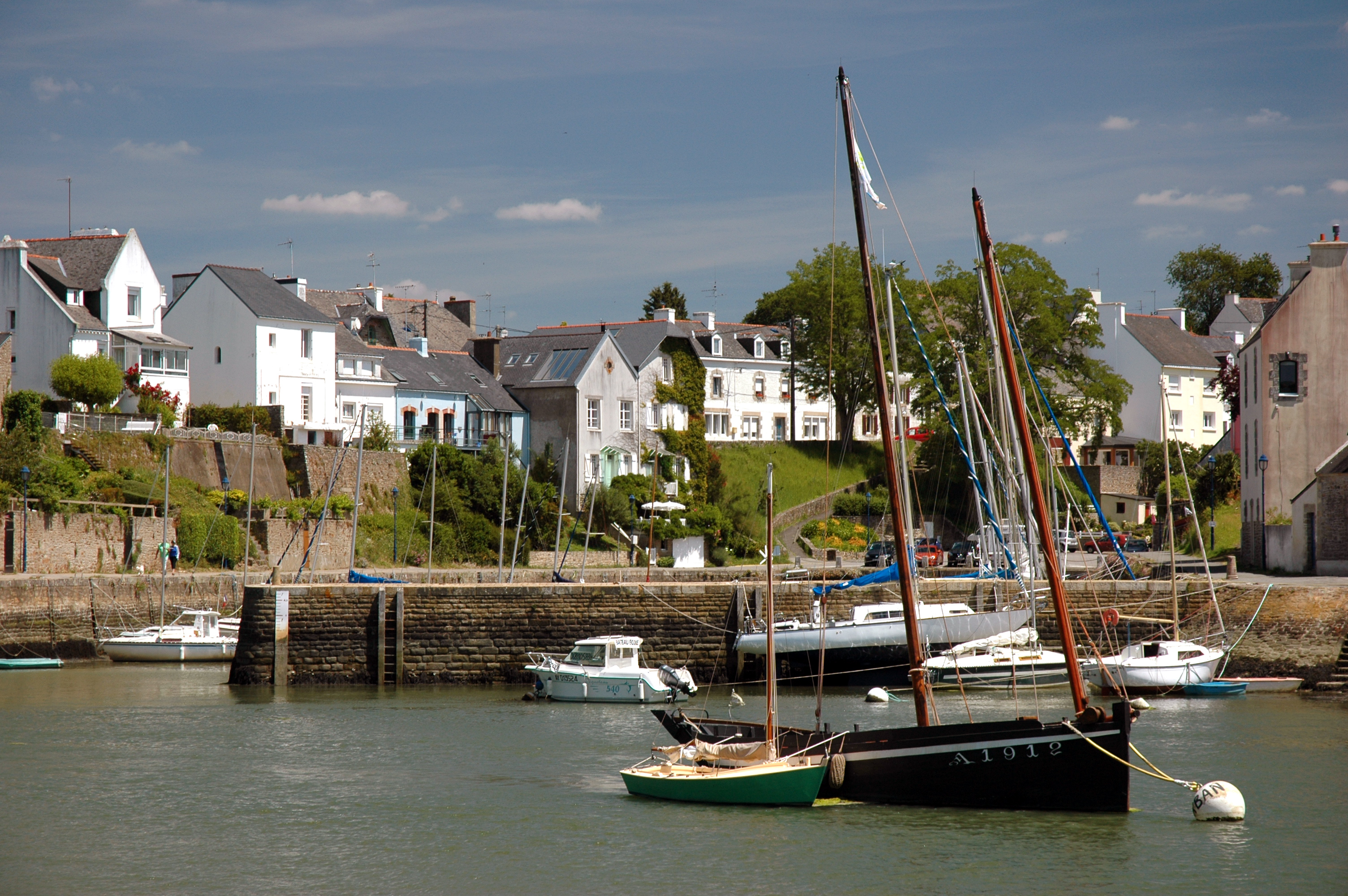

== See also ==
- Communes of the Morbihan department
