= Plescop =

Plescop Pleskob
- Commune
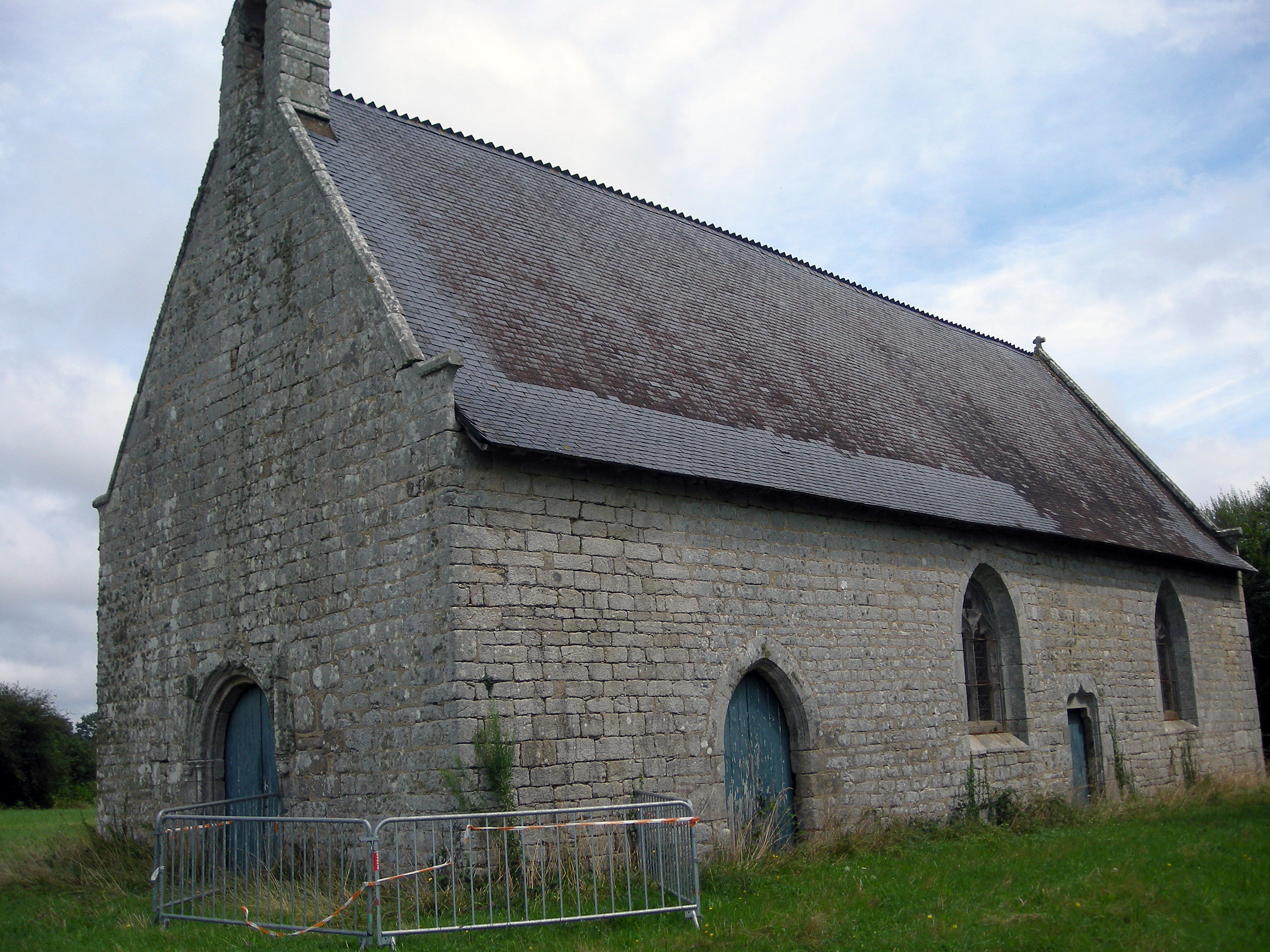
- The Chapel of Our Lady of Lézurgan, in Plescop

- Coat of arms
- Location of Plescop
- Location within France Location within Brittany
- Coordinates: 47°41′59″N 2°48′17″W
- Country: France
- Region: Brittany
- Department: Morbihan
- Arrondissement: Vannes
- Canton: Vannes-2
- Intercommunality: Golfe du Morbihan - Vannes Agglomération

Government
  - Mayor (2026–32): Benoît Lalys
- Area^{1}: 23.35 km^{2} (9.02 sq mi)
- Highest elevation: 67 m (220 ft)
- Lowest elevation: 17 m (56 ft)
- Population (2023): 6,362
  - Density: 272.5/km^{2} (705.7/sq mi)
- Time zone: UTC+01:00 (CET)
  - Summer (DST): UTC+02:00 (CEST)
- INSEE/Postal code: 56158 /56890
- ^{1} French Land Register data, which excludes lakes, ponds, glaciers > 1 km^{2} (0.386 sq mi or 247 acres) and river estuaries.

Plescop (French pronunciation: [plɛskɔp]; Breton: Pleskob) is a commune in the Morbihan department of Brittany in north-western France.

== Population ==
Inhabitants of Plescop are called in French Plescopais.

Historical population

Year	Pop.	±% p.a.
1793	849	—
1806	802	−0.44%
1821	1,005	+1.52%
1831	1,005	+0.00%
1836	920	−1.75%
1841	933	+0.28%
1846	1,013	+1.66%
1851	1,042	+0.57%
1856	988	−1.06%
1861	1,015	+0.54%
1866	1,149	+2.51%
1872	1,116	−0.48%
1876	1,173	+1.25%
1881	1,236	+1.05%
1886	1,242	+0.10%
1891	1,246	+0.06%
1896	1,229	−0.27%
1901	1,137	−1.54%

Year	Pop.	±% p.a.
1906	1,147	+0.18%
1911	1,100	−0.83%
1921	1,064	−0.33%
1926	1,050	−0.26%
1931	948	−2.02%
1936	1,007	+1.21%
1946	1,046	+0.38%
1954	1,030	−0.19%
1962	1,089	+0.70%
1968	1,209	+1.76%
1975	1,857	+6.32%
1982	2,678	+5.37%
1990	2,966	+1.28%
1999	3,671	+2.40%
2007	4,649	+3.00%
2012	5,091	+1.83%
2017	5,854	+2.83%
2023	6,362	+1.40%

Source: EHESS and INSEE (1968–2023)

== Map ==
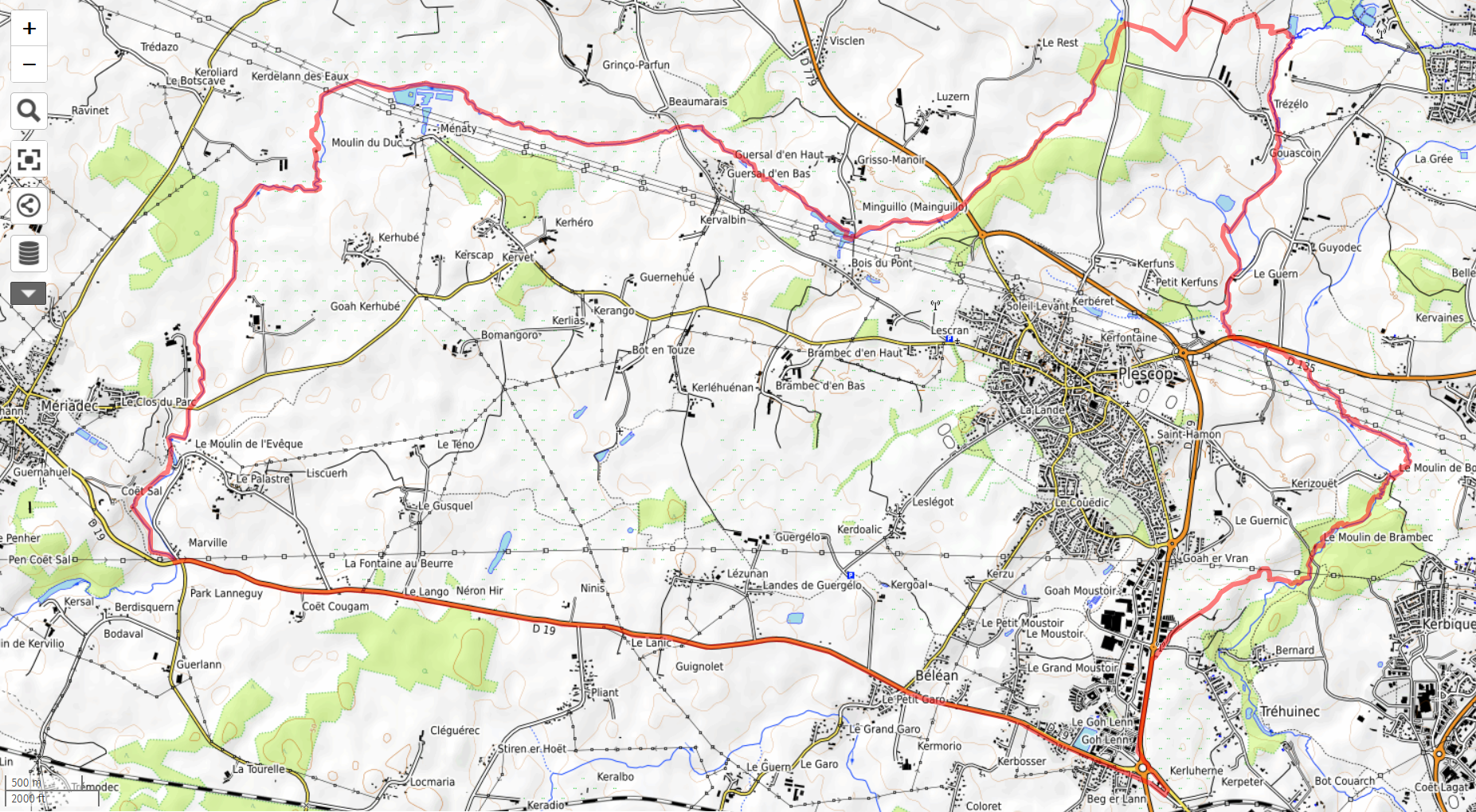
Topographic map

== Breton language ==
The municipality launched a linguistic plan through Ya d'ar brezhoneg on 28 January 2005.

== See also ==
- Communes of the Morbihan department
