= Saint-Armel, Morbihan =

Saint-Armel Sant-Armael
- Commune
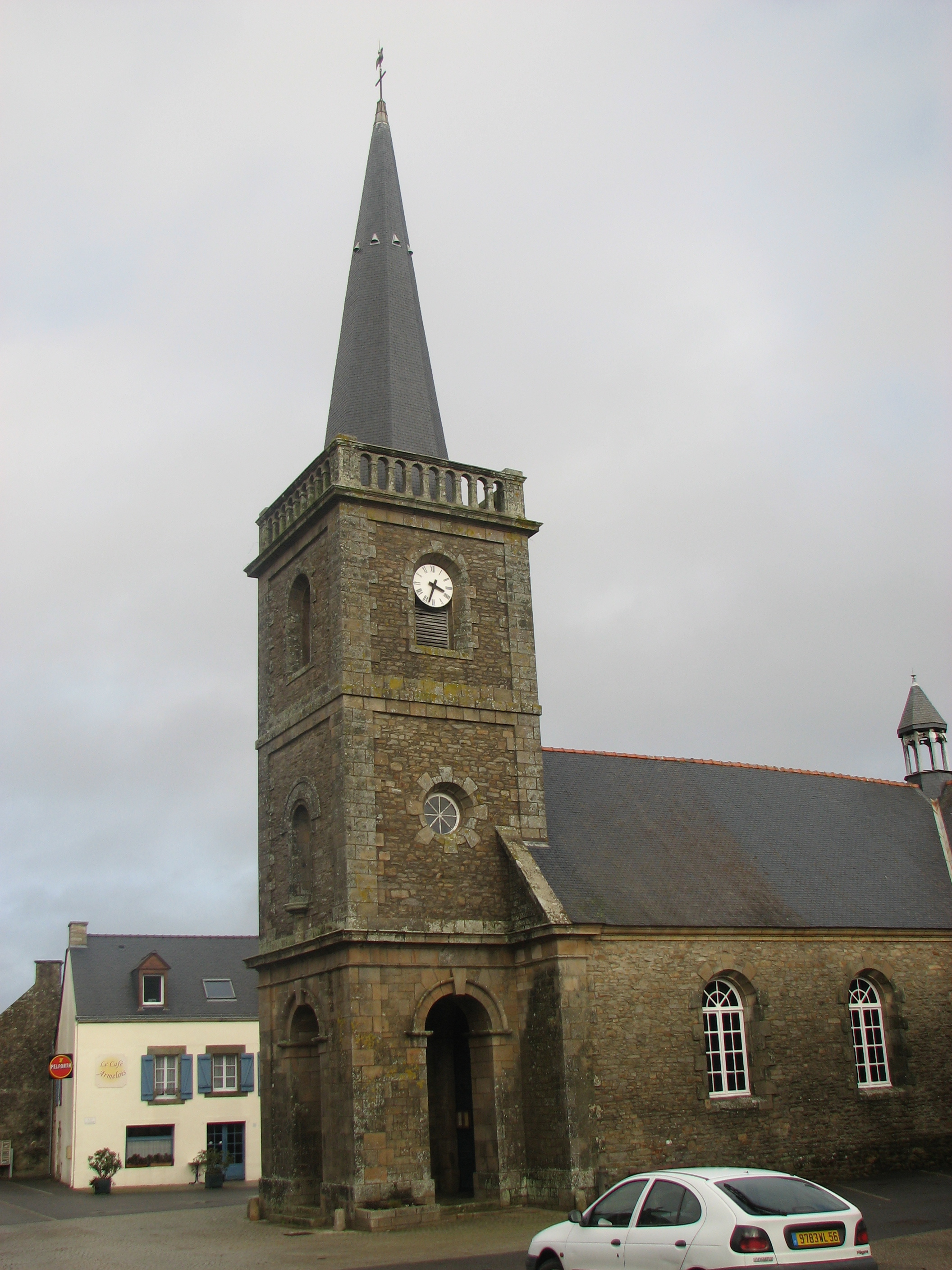
- The church in Saint-Armel

- Coat of arms
- Location of Saint-Armel
- Location within France Location within Brittany
- Coordinates: 47°34′24″N 2°42′34″W
- Country: France
- Region: Brittany
- Department: Morbihan
- Arrondissement: Vannes
- Canton: Séné
- Intercommunality: Golfe du Morbihan - Vannes Agglomération

Government
  - Mayor (2026–32): Philippe Trémoureux
- Area^{1}: 7.95 km^{2} (3.07 sq mi)
- Highest elevation: 17 m (56 ft)
- Lowest elevation: 0 m (0 ft)
- Population (2023): 903
  - Density: 114/km^{2} (294/sq mi)
- Time zone: UTC+01:00 (CET)
  - Summer (DST): UTC+02:00 (CEST)
- INSEE/Postal code: 56205 /56450
- ^{1} French Land Register data, which excludes lakes, ponds, glaciers > 1 km^{2} (0.386 sq mi or 247 acres) and river estuaries.

Saint-Armel (French pronunciation: [sɛ̃.t‿aʁmɛl]; Breton: Sant-Armael) is a commune in the Morbihan department of Brittany in north-western France.

== Demographics ==
Inhabitants of Saint-Armel are called in French Armelois.

== See also ==
- Communes of the Morbihan department
