= Arradon =

Commune in Brittany, France

Arradon Aradon
- Commune
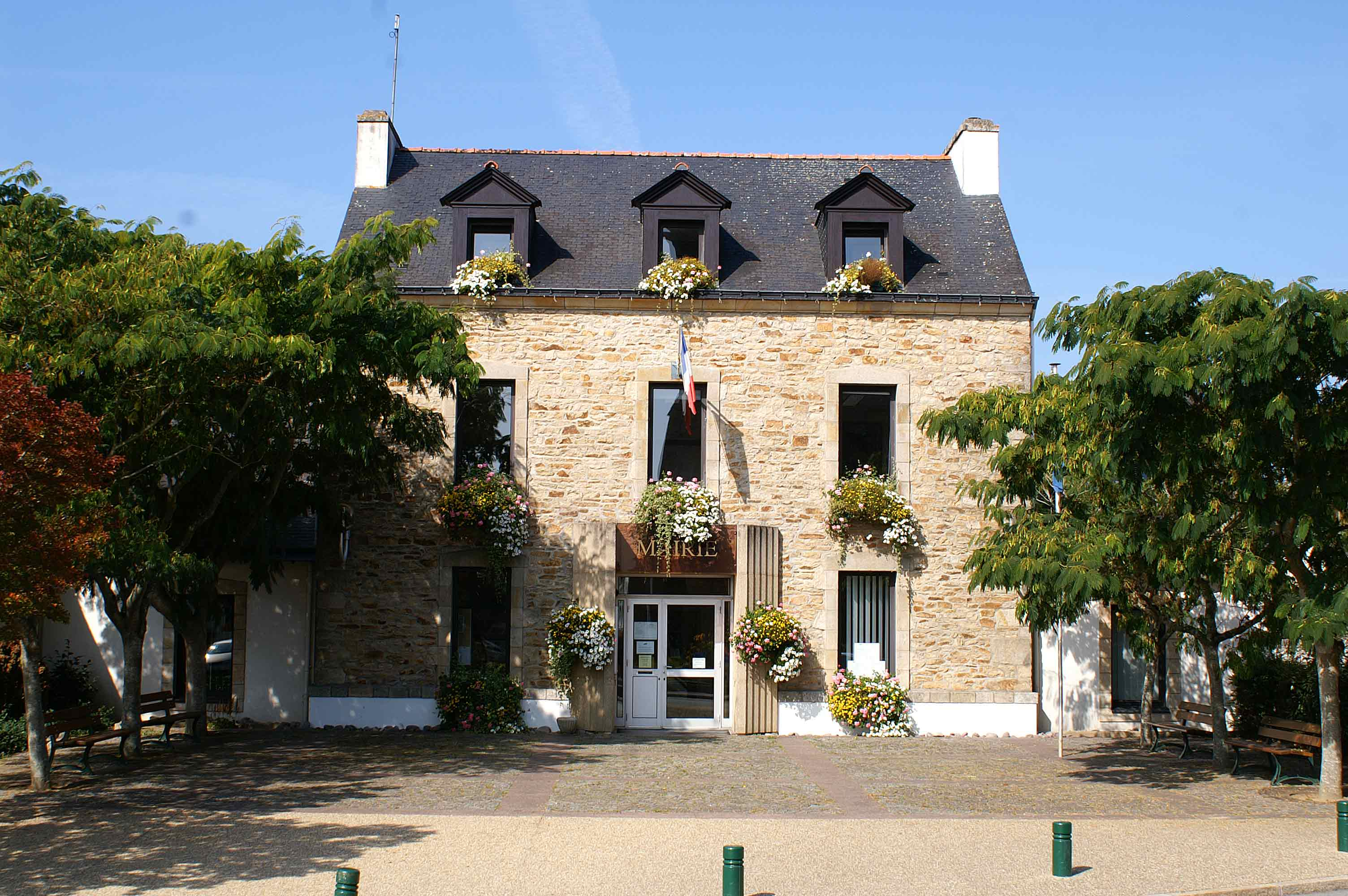
- The town hall in Arradon

- Coat of arms
- Location of Arradon
- Location within France Location within Brittany
- Coordinates: 47°37′35″N 2°49′20″W
- Country: France
- Region: Brittany
- Department: Morbihan
- Arrondissement: Vannes
- Canton: Vannes-2
- Intercommunality: Golfe du Morbihan - Vannes Agglomération

Government
  - Mayor (2026–32): Jean-Philippe Périès
- Area^{1}: 18.49 km^{2} (7.14 sq mi)
- Highest elevation: 61 m (200 ft)
- Lowest elevation: 0 m (0 ft)
- Population (2023): 5,835
  - Density: 315.6/km^{2} (817.3/sq mi)
- Time zone: UTC+01:00 (CET)
  - Summer (DST): UTC+02:00 (CEST)
- INSEE/Postal code: 56003 /56610
- ^{1} French Land Register data, which excludes lakes, ponds, glaciers > 1 km^{2} (0.386 sq mi or 247 acres) and river estuaries.

Arradon (French pronunciation: [aʁadɔ̃]; Breton: Aradon) is a commune in the Morbihan department in the Brittany region in northwestern France.

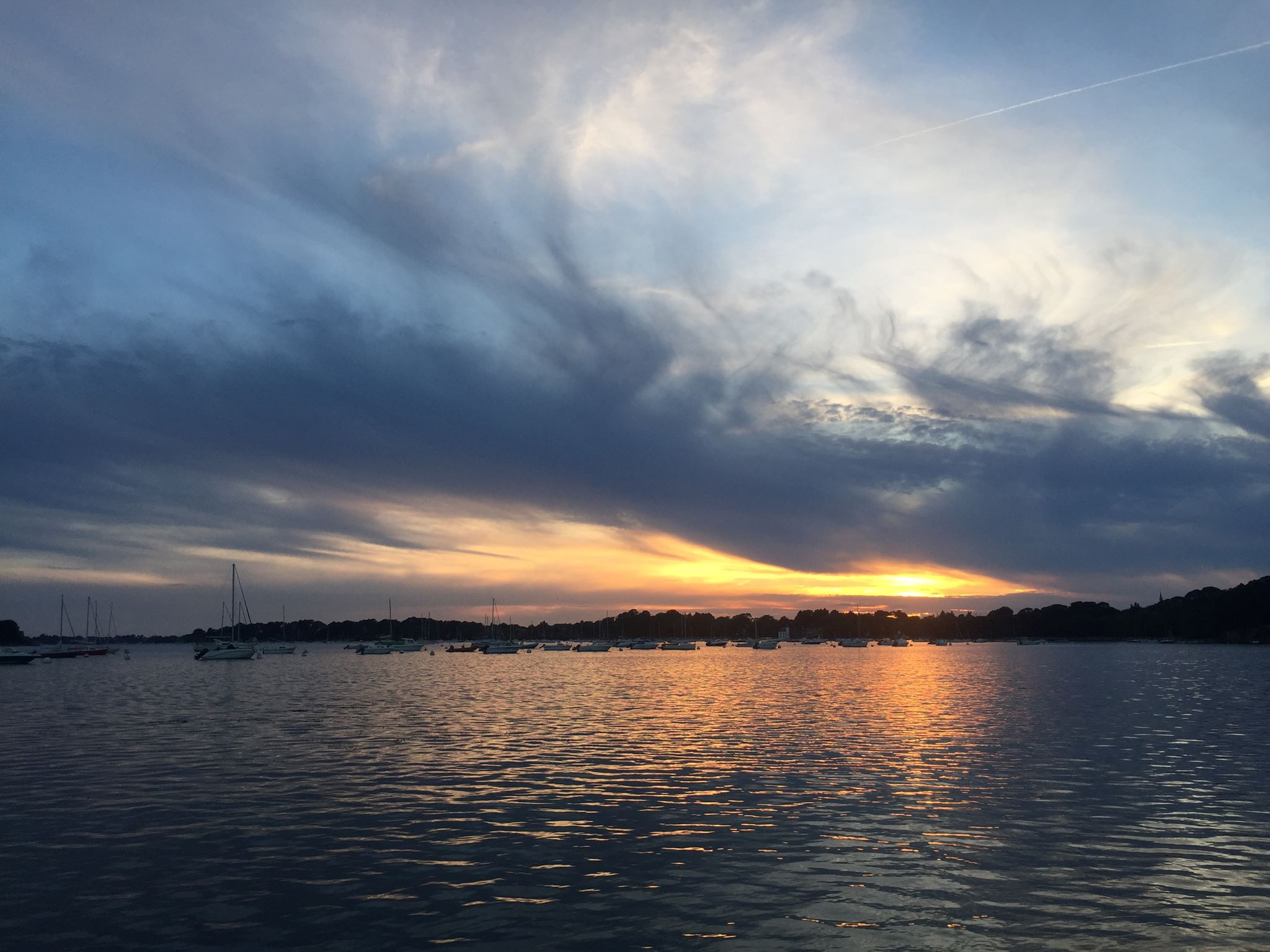
Gulf of Morbihan in Arradon

== Population ==
The inhabitants of Arradon are known as Arradonnais in French.

Historical population

Year	Pop.	±% p.a.
1793	1,349	—
1800	1,212	−1.52%
1806	1,151	−0.86%
1821	1,450	+1.55%
1831	1,364	−0.61%
1836	1,503	+1.96%
1841	1,404	−1.35%
1846	1,496	+1.28%
1851	1,577	+1.06%
1856	1,535	−0.54%
1861	1,554	+0.25%
1866	1,595	+0.52%
1872	1,470	−1.35%
1876	1,598	+2.11%
1881	1,729	+1.59%
1886	1,819	+1.02%
1891	1,790	−0.32%
1896	1,793	+0.03%
1901	1,808	+0.17%

Year	Pop.	±% p.a.
1906	1,932	+1.34%
1911	1,889	−0.45%
1921	1,801	−0.48%
1926	1,768	−0.37%
1931	1,674	−1.09%
1936	1,609	−0.79%
1946	2,053	+2.47%
1954	1,782	−1.75%
1962	1,653	−0.93%
1968	1,976	+3.02%
1975	2,760	+4.89%
1982	3,706	+4.30%
1990	4,317	+1.93%
1999	4,719	+0.99%
2007	5,215	+1.26%
2012	5,463	+0.93%
2017	5,340	−0.45%
2023	5,835	+1.49%

Source: EHESS and INSEE (1968-2023)

== Map ==
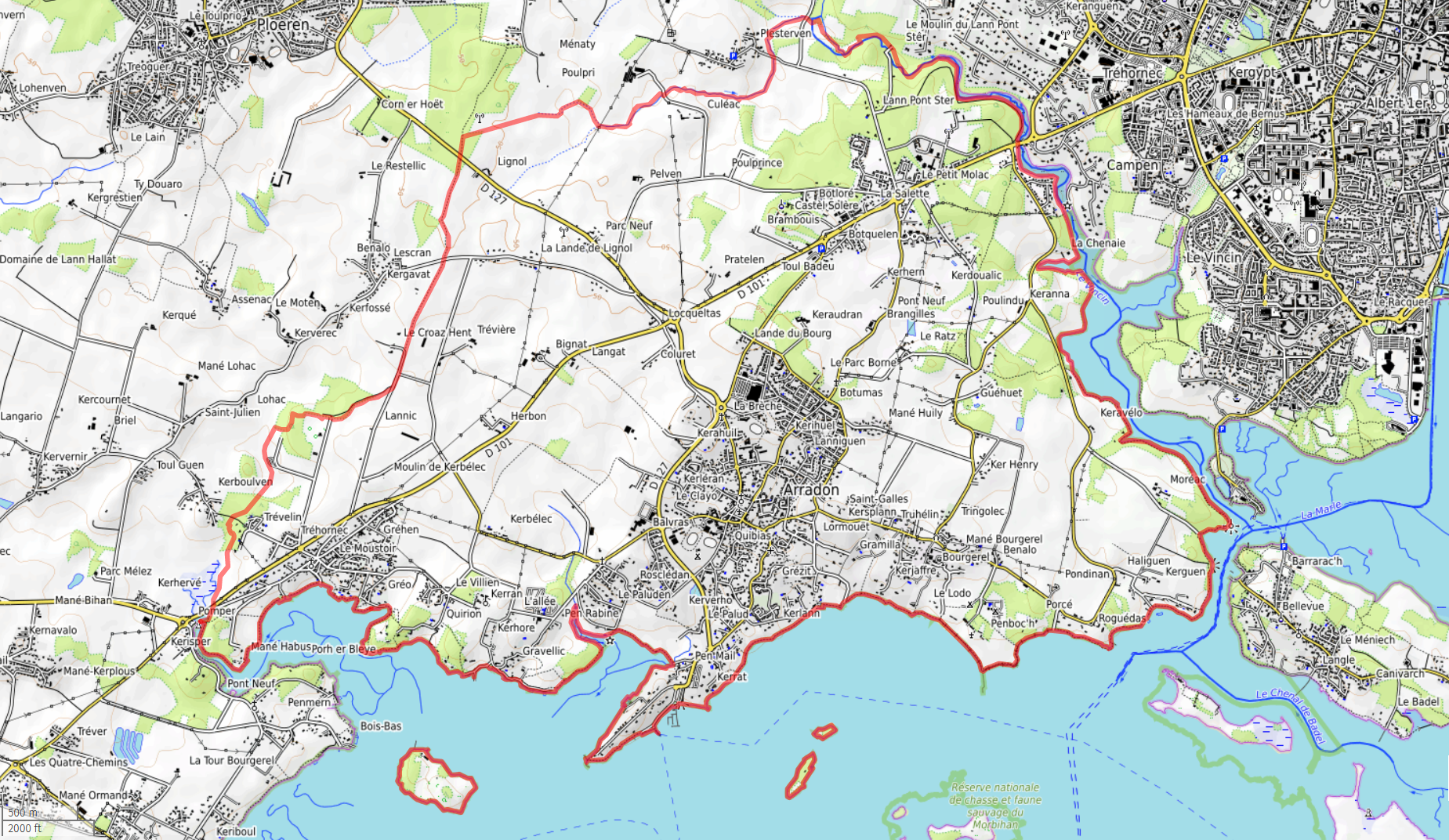
Topographic map

== See also ==
- Communes of the Morbihan department
