= Plougoumelen =

Plougoumelen Plougouvelen
- Commune
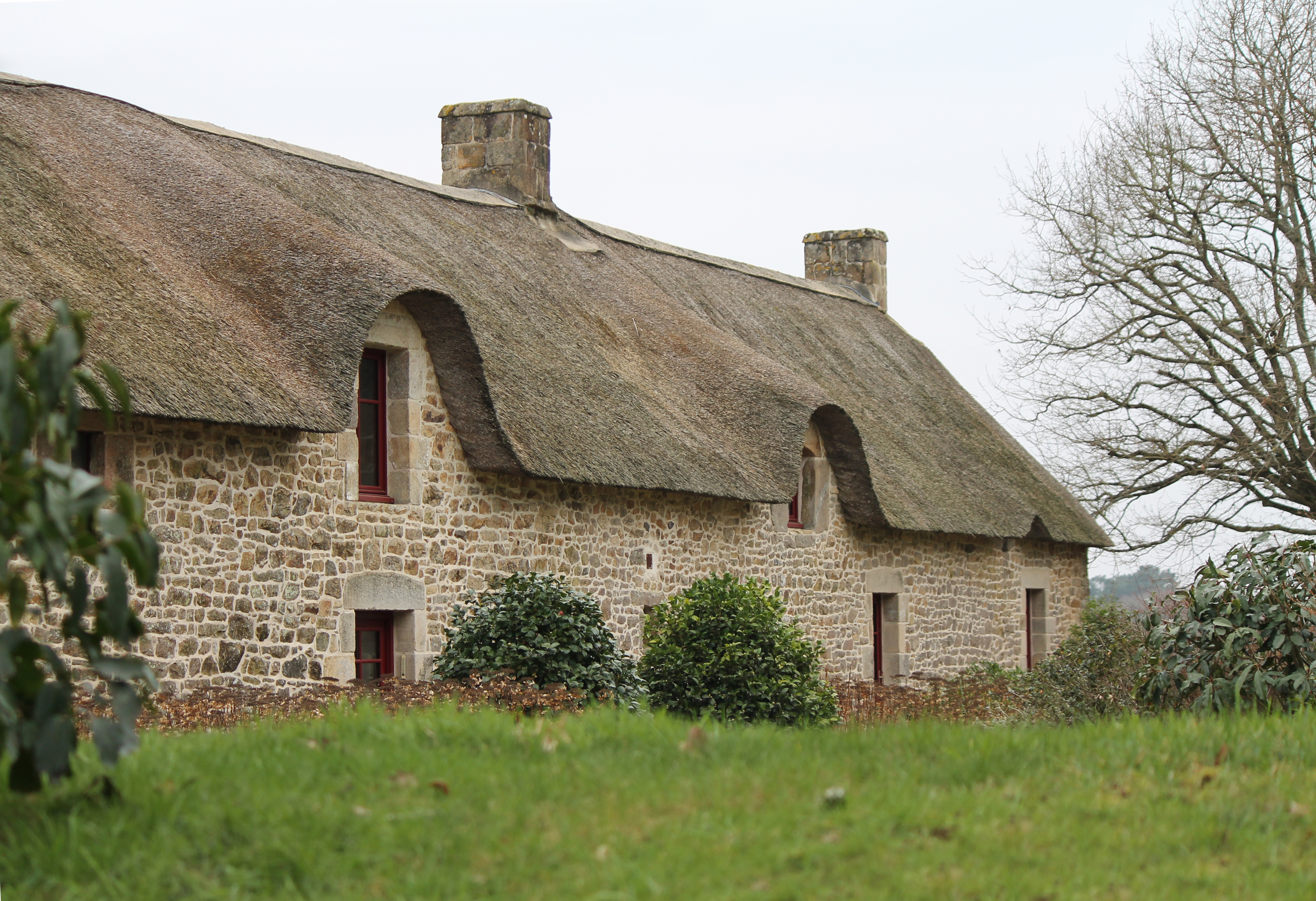
- A cottage in the hamlet of Cahire
- Location of Plougoumelen
- Location within France Location within Brittany
- Coordinates: 47°39′12″N 2°54′56″W
- Country: France
- Region: Brittany
- Department: Morbihan
- Arrondissement: Vannes
- Canton: Vannes-2
- Intercommunality: Golfe du Morbihan - Vannes Agglomération

Government
  - Mayor (2026–32): Stéphanie Guillemot
- Area^{1}: 21.30 km^{2} (8.22 sq mi)
- Highest elevation: 56 m (184 ft)
- Lowest elevation: 0 m (0 ft)
- Population (2023): 2,664
  - Density: 125.1/km^{2} (323.9/sq mi)
- Time zone: UTC+01:00 (CET)
  - Summer (DST): UTC+02:00 (CEST)
- INSEE/Postal code: 56167 /56400
- ^{1} French Land Register data, which excludes lakes, ponds, glaciers > 1 km^{2} (0.386 sq mi or 247 acres) and river estuaries.

Plougoumelen (Breton: Plougouvelen) is a commune in the Morbihan department and Brittany region of north-western France.

== Population ==
Historical population
Year	Pop.	±% p.a.
1968	729	—
1975	1,023	+4.96%
1982	1,357	+4.12%
1990	1,544	+1.63%
1999	1,762	+1.48%
2007	2,301	+3.39%
2012	2,417	+0.99%
2017	2,439	+0.18%
2023	2,664	+1.48%
Source: INSEE

In French the inhabitants of Plougoumelen are known as Plougoumelenois.

== See also ==
- Communes of the Morbihan department
