= Elven, Morbihan =

Commune in Brittany, France

Elven An Elven
- Commune
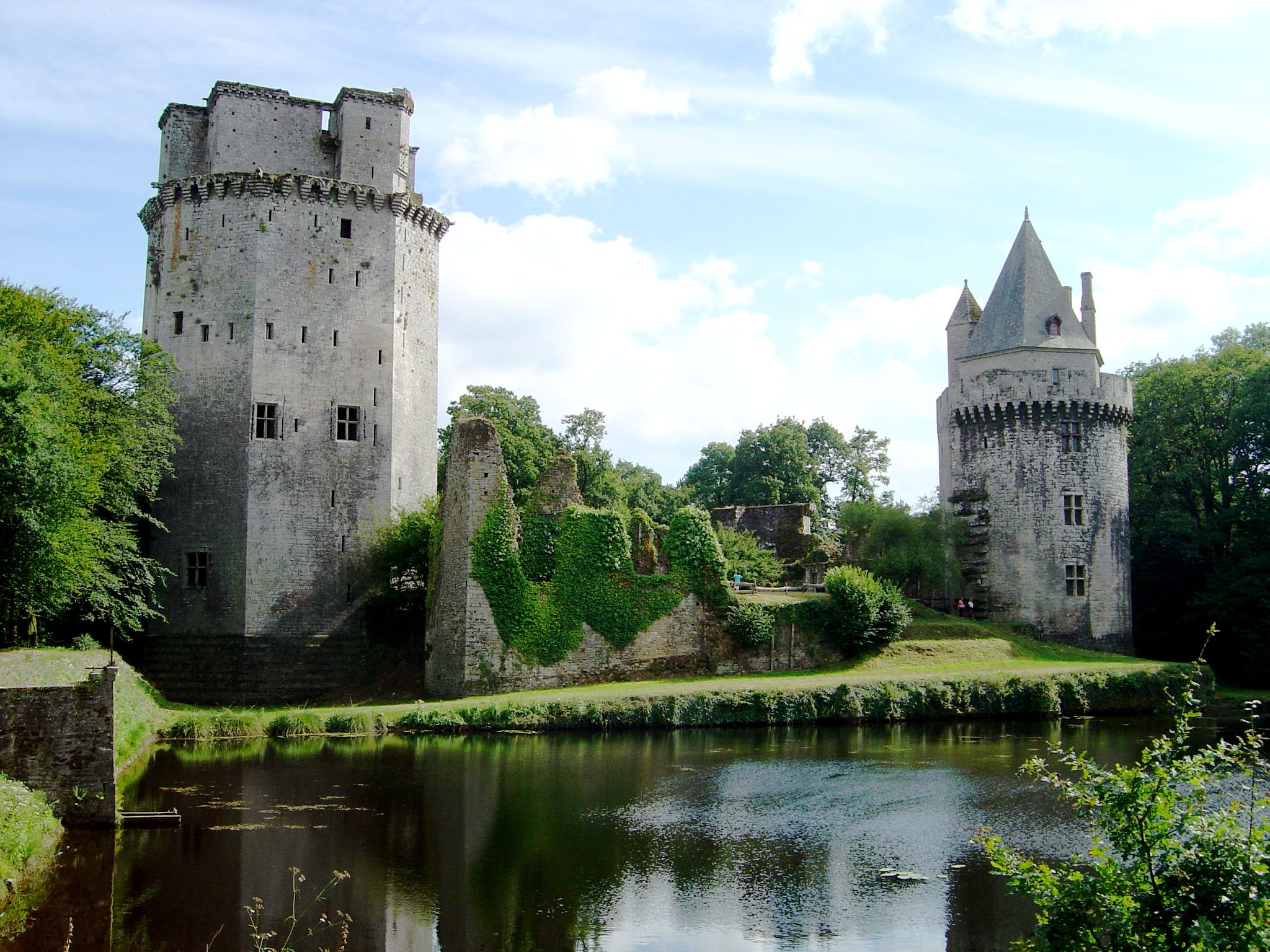
- Château de Largoët

- Coat of arms
- Location of Elven
- Location within France Location within Brittany
- Coordinates: 47°43′56″N 2°35′22″W
- Country: France
- Region: Brittany
- Department: Morbihan
- Arrondissement: Vannes
- Canton: Questembert
- Intercommunality: Golfe du Morbihan - Vannes Agglomération

Government
  - Mayor (2026–32): Luc Le Trionnaire
- Area^{1}: 64.05 km^{2} (24.73 sq mi)
- Highest elevation: 152 m (499 ft)
- Lowest elevation: 34 m (112 ft)
- Population (2023): 6,651
  - Density: 103.8/km^{2} (268.9/sq mi)
- Time zone: UTC+01:00 (CET)
  - Summer (DST): UTC+02:00 (CEST)
- INSEE/Postal code: 56053 /56250
- ^{1} French Land Register data, which excludes lakes, ponds, glaciers > 1 km^{2} (0.386 sq mi or 247 acres) and river estuaries.

Elven (French pronunciation: [ɛlvɛ̃]; Breton: An Elven) is a commune, located in the department of Morbihan and region of Brittany, western France.

The commune is listed as a Village étape.

== Geography ==
The village of Elven is located about 15 kilometres (9.3 miles) from the Vannes-Rennes junction on route nationale 166. Until 2015, it was the seat of the former canton of Elven which also included Saint-Nolff, Monterblanc, Sulniac, Trédion and La Vraie-Croix. Elven is near the Lanvaux moor, surrounded by several woodlands: Helfaut wood, Coeby wood, Kerfily, and la Boissière.

The Kerbiler stream leaves the land of the Château de Largoët and crosses la Boissière where it encounters the ruins of the Bragou mill (where it is still possible to see the mill wheel) and then flows down to the village via another old mill (the Elven mill) before emptying into the river Arz a few kilometres later. The terrain is mostly granite which is quarried in several places, one of which is the Parc quarry near the Château Largoët.

The town centre spreads around the imposing church of St. Alban.

== History ==
An ancient site of human settlement, the history of Elven can be traced back to the Bronze Age with archaeological evidence discovered in the commune, in particular the village of Bocolo where the cache of a metal smelter was found. There are also many megaliths in the canton: these include the Loge-Aux-Loups on the road to Trédion, the Pierre Tabulaire de la Bataille in the Coeby forest and the twin menhirs of Babouin et Babouine that were carved with faces at an unknown period.

The commune of Elven was founded by religious leaders who emigrated across the Channel from Britain in the fifth century. The name evidently comes from Saint Elwen or Elven.

A castle was built around AD 900 to defend against the Norman invasion. The present castle Largoët was built in the fourteenth century 2 kilometres (1.2 miles) from the town in the middle of a great expanse of woods and was the seat of the Marshall of Brittany. Henry Tudor Duke of Richmond, the future Henry VII of England, held it between 1474 and 1476. He stayed at most of the ducal and seigneurial houses in Brittany but stayed here the longest. The castle differed little from English castles but its striking feature was a 144-foot donjon of six storeys completed in 1475, isolated from the rest of the castle, by a moat. It was on the sixth floor of this Tour d'Elven that Henry, Duke of Richmond spent two years.

Elven was part of the Chouannerie, a royalist uprising at the end of the eighteenth century. Indeed, the head Chouan Joseph Gambert, captain of the canton's companies, was killed near the village of Panistrel in 1794. A street now bears his name. Underground chambers inhabited by the Chouans can be found in the Saint-Bily woods. The 1988 film Chouans! was partially made on location in Elven.

During the German occupation, Elven was the scene of the first airborne operation, dubbed Operation Savannah, on 15 March 1941. A monument commemorates the event on the road to Questembert.

Three members of the French Resistance were shot in July 1944. The Rue des Martyrs de la Résistance is dedicated to them.

== Heraldry ==

Gules, on two towers of bricks or with sable battlements, with the azure canton with ten besants or.

The two towers are the remains of the castle Largoët. The canton with ten bezants indicates the House of Rieux who lived in the castle and whose arms are inlaid on the entrance above the drawbridge.

== Bagad Elven ==
Bagad Elven, a traditional Breton musical group, was first formed from the Elven Celtic group which was established in 1965. The creation of Bagad Elven really took place in 1977 with the help, the following year, of Roland Becker. In 1984, Bagad Elven joined the BAS (Bodadeg ar Sonerion). In 2005, they recorded their first CD, "Un dimanche matin à Elven". Together with their artistic advisor Roland Becker, Elven Bagad won the title of 3rd category in the National Bagadou Championship of 2008. At the end of 2008, Elven Bagad released their second album: "Mémoires d'aujourd'hui" which represents the dialogue between the music of today and folk tunes collected over the last 60 years.

== Demographics ==
Historical population
Year	Pop.	±% p.a.
1968	2,862	—
1975	2,928	+0.33%
1982	3,003	+0.36%
1990	3,312	+1.23%
1999	3,559	+0.80%
2007	4,663	+3.43%
2012	5,510	+3.39%
2017	6,021	+1.79%
2023	6,651	+1.67%
Source: INSEE

Because of the proximity of the RN 166, Elven is a vibrant village. From about 3500 inhabitants in 1999, the town has grown to over 6,000. Many housing estates and individual houses are under construction. Local town planning is being modified and a ZAC (green zone) is being established in the town centre.

== Sites and monuments ==
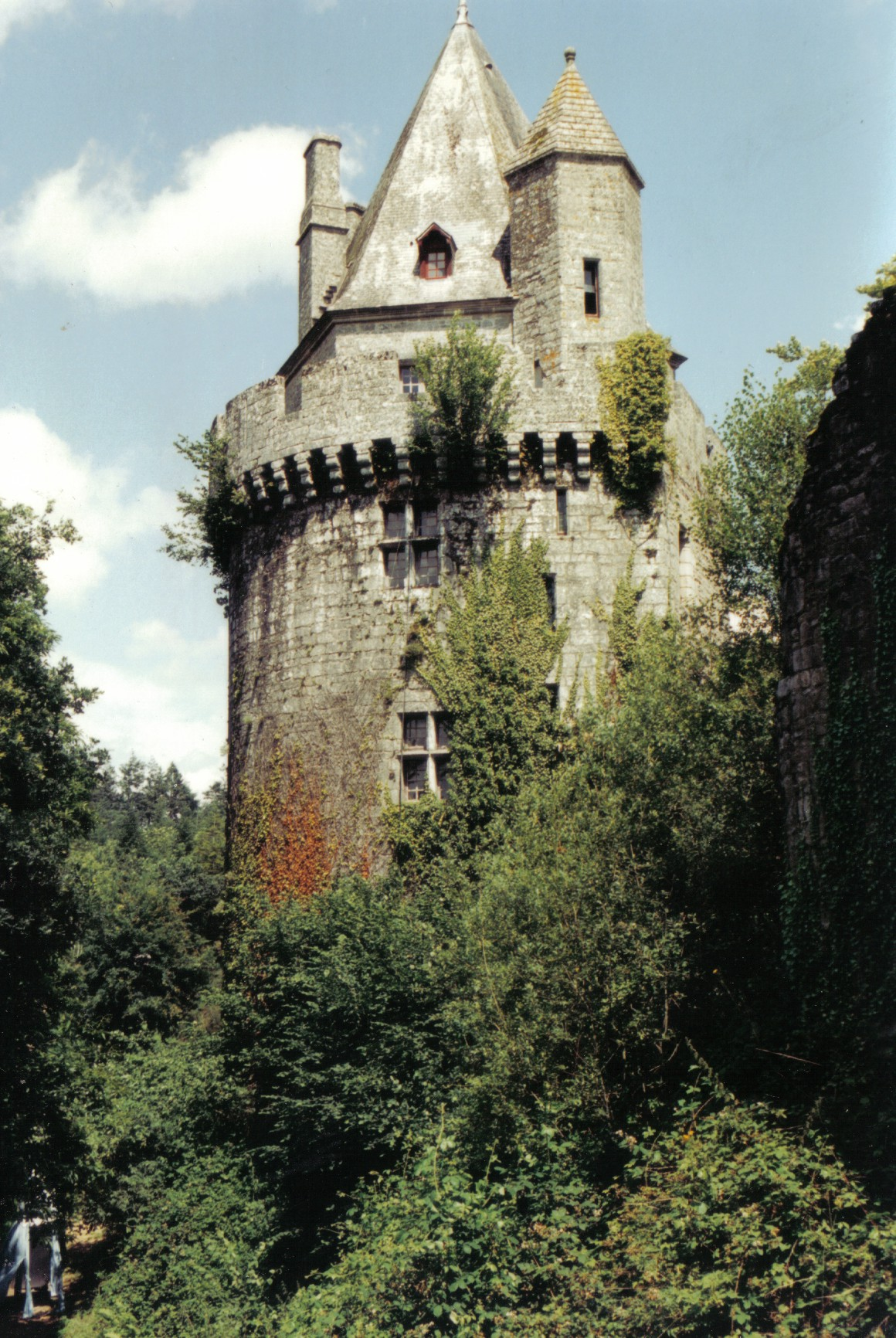
Tour d'Elven

Largoët castle

The church of St Alban is dedicated to Alban of Verulamium, patron saint of Elven, this dedication refers to the martyrdom suffered by Alban in Britain in AD303. The Normans burned the first wooden church. In 1121, a Romanesque church was built, but was destroyed by fire again in 1525. A Gothic church was subsequently built, of which only the choir now remains. In 1536 a neo-Gothic nave was built and a bell tower in 1642. In the nineteenth century, the time-damaged structure was restored and the nave and transept were rebuilt. The bell tower was completed in 1877 and the church was consecrated in 1879.

== People associated with the commune ==
Catherine Descartes (1637–1706), poet and niece of the philosopher René Descartes, was born in Kerleau manor. Her uncle signed the baptismal register. In 2002 a new school was inaugurated which is named after Catherine Descartes.

== Twinning ==
Elven has been twinned since 1998 with the city of Lüdingworth, District of Cuxhaven, in Lower Saxony, Germany.

== See also ==
- Communes of the Morbihan department
