= Saint-Perreux =

Saint-Perreux Sant-Pereg
- Commune
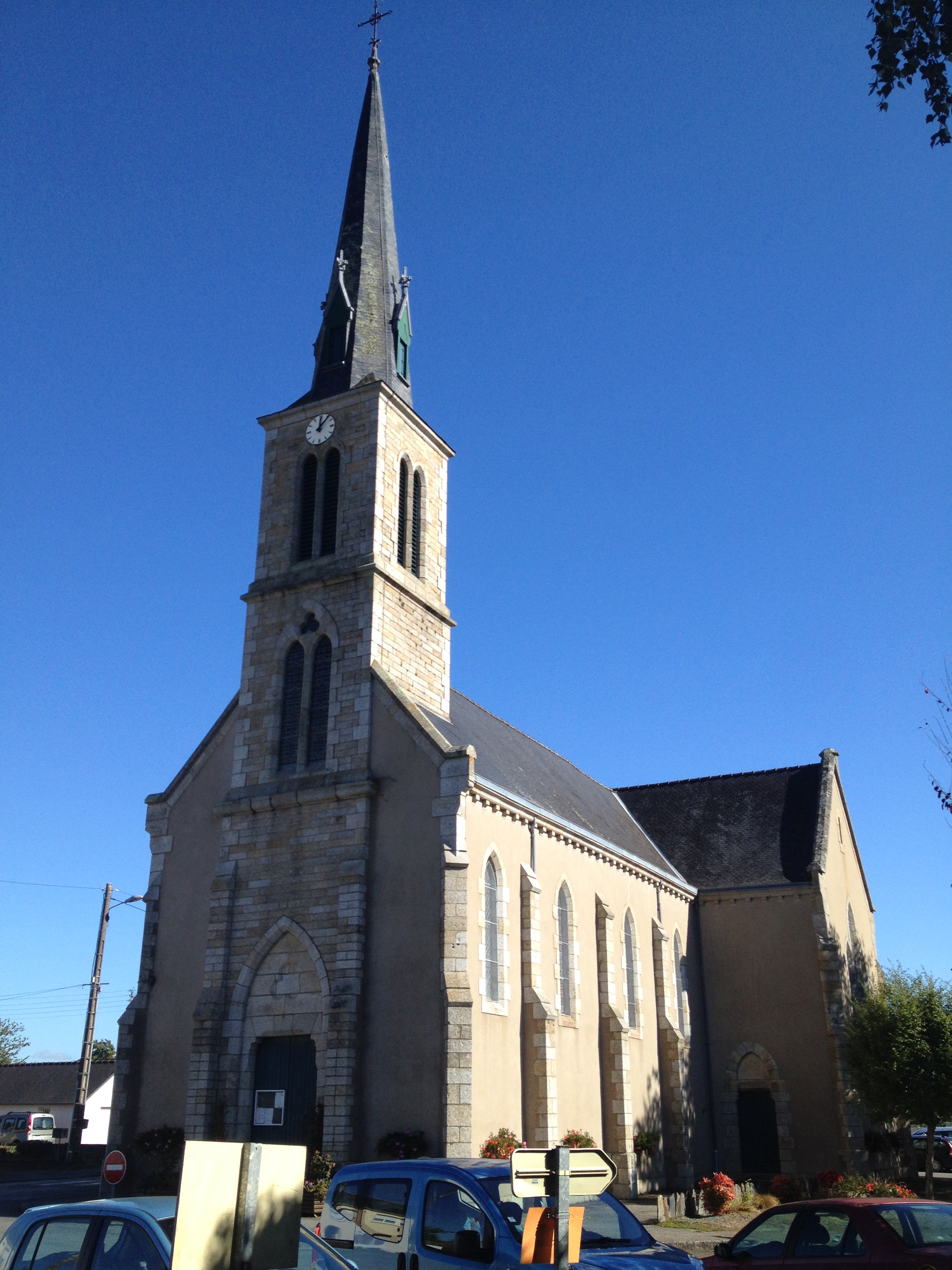
- The church of Saint-Perreux.

- Coat of arms
- Location of Saint-Perreux
- Location within France Location within Brittany
- Coordinates: 47°40′12″N 2°06′23″W
- Country: France
- Region: Brittany
- Department: Morbihan
- Arrondissement: Vannes
- Canton: Guer
- Intercommunality: Redon Agglomération

Government
  - Mayor (2026–32): Pierrick Launay
- Area^{1}: 6.23 km^{2} (2.41 sq mi)
- Highest elevation: 49 m (161 ft)
- Lowest elevation: 1 m (3.3 ft)
- Population (2023): 1,086
  - Density: 174/km^{2} (451/sq mi)
- Time zone: UTC+01:00 (CET)
  - Summer (DST): UTC+02:00 (CEST)
- INSEE/Postal code: 56232 /56350
- ^{1} French Land Register data, which excludes lakes, ponds, glaciers > 1 km^{2} (0.386 sq mi or 247 acres) and river estuaries.

Saint-Perreux (French pronunciation: [sɛ̃ pɛʁø]; Breton: Sant-Pereg) is a commune in the Morbihan department of Brittany in north-western France. It was named after the Welsh monk, Saint Petroc.

== Geography ==
The river Arz forms most of the commune's western and south-western borders, then flows (at Saint-Jean-la-Poterie) into the Oust, which forms the commune's eastern border.

== Demographics ==
Inhabitants of Saint-Perreux are called in French Perrusiens or Perreusiens.

== See also ==
- Communes of the Morbihan department
