= Michel Bussi =

French author (born 1965)

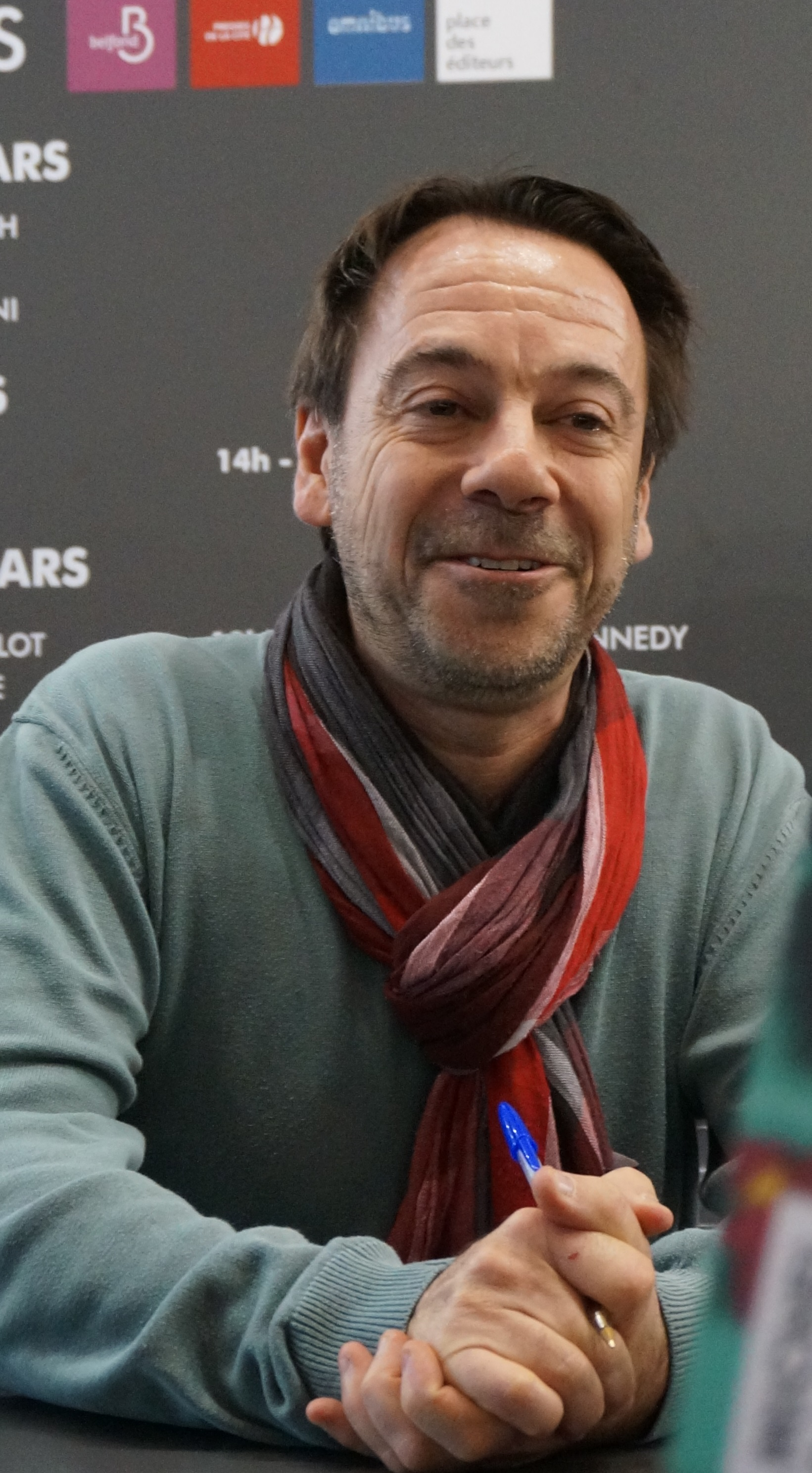
- Michel Bussi at Salon du Livre in Paris in 2015
- Born: 29 April 1965 (age 61); Louviers, Normandy, France
- Occupation: Professor of Geography
- Writing career
- Language: French
- Genre: Detective novels
- Notable work: Un avion sans elle
- Website: www.michel-bussi.fr

Michel Bussi (French pronunciation: [miʃɛl bysi]; born 29 April 1965) is a French author, known for writing thriller novels, and a political analyst and professor of geography at the University of Rouen, where he leads a Public Scientific and Technical Research Establishment (French: Unité mixte de recherche, "UMR") in the French National Centre for Scientific Research (French: Centre national de la recherche scientifique, "CNRS"), where he is a specialist in electoral geography.

According to the Le Figaro/GfK list of bestsellers, Bussi was the second bestselling French author of 2018, selling 975,800 copies. He has appeared in the annual top 10 since 2013.

== Biography ==
Bussi was born on 29 April 1965 in Louviers, Eure.

Bussi usually publishes a book a year, but they can take several years to become popular. For example, Mourir sur Seine (2008) and Nymphéas Noirs (2011) had only modest initial success, but paperwork editions, serialisations and above all his most popular work Un avion Sans Elle have propelled him into the limelight.

Many of his novels are set in Normandy. His local topicality, together with his teaching and research in Normandy, won him the title of Parrain Officiel (official sponsor) during the 2014 Normandy Festival, a regional festival celebrated throughout Normandy and beyond.

== Career ==
In the early 1990s he wrote his first novel, a thriller set around the Normandy landings, which was rejected by several publishing houses. He then wrote short stories, but they too were rejected. Ten years later, inspired by a trip to Rome at the peak of popularity of Dan Brown's The Da Vinci Code and after reading Arsène Lupin by Maurice Leblanc, Bussi returned to Rouen with his IGN papers and resumed work on his manuscript until in 2006, as Code Lupin, it found an academic publisher, Éditions des Falaises. The first manuscript was reworked nine times.

Bussi's first novel, Code Lupin, sold more than 7,000 copies, and in 2010 was serialised over thirty days by the Paris Normandie daily newspaper. In 2007, his second novel, Omaha Crimes, won the French: Prix Sang d'Encre ("Blood Writing Prize") of the town of Vienne, Isère, the 2008 prize for first detective novel at Lens, Pas-de-Calais, the 2008 schools writing prize at Caen, the 2008 Octave-Mirbeau prize at the Trévières Literary Festival, and the 2008 Ancres Noires by Le Havre. In 2008, his third novel, Mourir sur Seine ("Death on the Seine"), was published to coincide with the Rouen Regatta. It sold several thousand copies within weeks. It won the Basse-Normandie Regional Committee Prize (Queen Mathilde Prize). In 2009, his fourth novel, Sang famille ("Family Blood"), aimed at both an adult and teenage audience, was published.

In 2010, he contributed to the Les Couleurs de l'instant ("Colours of the Moment") anthology of short stories with French: T'en souviens-tu mon Anaïs? ("Do you remember my Anaïs?"), set in Veules-les-Roses and based on the "legend" of Anaïs Aubert. The same year, he changed publishers to Presses de la Cité. His novel Nymphéas noirs ("Black Waterlilies"), a cloak-and-dagger thriller set in Giverny, the home of Claude Monet, was published on 20 January 2011. It was critically praised and became a best seller, winning the Readers' Award at the Cognac Thriller Festival, the Mediterranean Thriller Prize at the Villeneuve-lès-Avignon Festival, and the Michel Lebrun Grand Prize of the 25th hour of Le Mans, the Readers' Priye at Sang d'Encre of Vienne, and the Gustave Flaubert Grand Prize of the Norman Writers' Guild, becoming the best-selling French detective novel of 2011. It was issued in paperback on 5 September 2013.

In January 2012, his novel Un avion sans elle ("After the Crash"), his first work to be set outside of Normandy, was published by Presses de la Cité. The critic Gérald Collard called it the thriller of the year. In its first year of publication it was awarded the Maison de la Presse award, the Popular Novel Award and Best French-language Detective Novel (at Montigny-Les-Cormeilles). Within months of release, it had sold 500,000 copies in France and has since sold over one million copies. It has been sold in translation in 34 countries worldwide including Spain, Germany, Italy, Russia, Poland, Bulgaria, Hungary, Japan, Korea, Lithuania, Portugal, Taiwan, United Kingdom, Israel, Brazil, Czech Republic, Slovakia, Norway, Greece, Turkey, Netherlands, Vietnam, Latvia, Romania and Serbia. From September 2013, it was serialised daily in l'Est Républicain for over 200 days. A four episode TV adaptation will be broadcast in 2019 on M6. In March 2013, La Cité published Michel Bussi's seventh novel, Ne lâche pas ma main ("Don't Let Go of My Hand"). The novel takes place on the tropical island of Réunion and revolves around a woman who disappears from her hotel room. Her husband, suspected of her murder, runs away with their daughter, and is pursued by the police. The novel was a finalist for the 2012 Relay Travellers' Award for May 2012, a finalist for the Grand Prix for Detective Fiction and won the 2013 Island Novel Award. In 2014, it was released in paperback by Pocket. A TV adaptation for TF1 is in production. In 2013, Bussi was the eighth bestselling French author, selling 478,800 books.

In May 2014, La Cité published his eighth novel, N'oublier jamais ("Never forget"). In 2014, Bussi was the fifth bestselling French author, selling 843,000 books. In 2015, his novel Maman a tort ("Mother is Wrong") was published. In May 2018, a 6 episode TV adaptation was broadcast on France 2. In 2015, Bussi was the third bestselling French author, selling over 1 million books.

In 2016, Bussi was the second bestselling French author, selling 1,135,300 books. In 2017, he was the third bestselling French author, selling 931,000 books. In 2018, he was the second bestselling French author, selling 975,800 books. In 2020, he was the third bestselling French author, selling 815,003 books. In 2021, he was the fourth best-selling French author, selling 721,000 books. In 2024, he was the tenth bestselling French author, selling 525,478 books.

== Bibliography ==
Novels
First published	French title	First published in English	English title	Notes
2006	Code Lupin	—	—	Rereleased in 2019
2007	Omaha crimes	—	—	
2008	Mourir sur Seine	—	—	Reworked and rereleased in 2019
2009	Sang famille	—	Family Blood	Rereleased in 2018
2011	Nymphéas noirs	2016	Black Water Lilies	
2012	Un avion sans elle	2015	After the Crash	
2013	Ne lâche pas ma main	2017	Don't Let Go	
2014	N'oublier jamais	2020	Never Forget	
2015	Gravé dans le sable	—	—	Re-written version of Omaha crimes
2015	Maman a tort	2021	The Other Mother (UK), The Double Mother (US)	
2016	Le temps est assassin	2018	Time is a Killer	
2017	On la trouvait plutôt jolie	2022	The Red Notebook	
2018	Les Contes du Réveil Matin	—	—	Children's book, illustrated by Éric Puybaret
2019	J'ai dû rêver trop fort	—	—	
2020	Au soleil redouté	—	—	
2021	Rien ne t'efface	2024	Nothing Can Erase You	
2021	Code 612 : qui a tué le Petit Prince ?	—	—	
2022	Nouvelle Babel	—	—	
2023	Trois vies par semaine	2025	Lying in Wait	
2024	Mon coeur a déménagé	—	—	
2024	Les assassins de l'aube	—	—	
2025	Les ombres du monde	—	—	

Novellas in collections

- 2010 — "T'en souviens-tu mon Anaïs?" in Les Couleurs de l'instant
- 2015 — "L'Armoire normande" in Quatre auteurs à la plage
- 2016 — "La Seconde Morte, in 13 à table!

Non-fiction books

- Éléments de géographie électorale: à travers l'exemple de la France de l'Ouest [Elements of Electoral Geography: Examples from Western France] (in French). Mont-Saint-Aignan: University of Rouen. 1998. ISBN 2-87775-236-4.
- Pour une nouvelle géographie du politique: territoires, démocratie, élection [Towards a New Political Geography: Territory, Democracy, Election] (in French). Paris: Anthropos. 2004. ISBN 2-7178-4764-2.

== Awards ==
=== Omaha Crimes ===
- 2007: Prix Sang d'Encre ("Blood Writing Prize"), Vienne, Isère
- 2008: Prix littéraire du premier roman policier ("Literary Prize for First Detective Novel"), Lens, Pas-de-Calais
- 2008: Prix littéraire lycéen ("Academic Writing Prize"), Caen
- 2008: Prix Octave-Mirbeau, Trévières
- 2008, Les Ancres noires Writers Prize, Le Havre

=== Mourir sur Seine ===
- 2008: Prix du Comité régional du livre de Basse-Normandie (Queen Mathilde Prize)

=== Nymphéas noirs ===
- 2011: Readers' Thriller Prize, Cognac Festival
- 2011: Mediterranean Thriller prize (Villeneuve-lès-Avignon Festival)
- 2011: Michel-Lebrun Prize at the 25th Hour of Le Mans
- 2011: Gustave Flaubert Grand Prize, Norman Writers' Guild
- 2011: Writers' Prize at the Festival Sang d'Encre, Vienne, Isère
- 2011: Critics' Prize for Mystery (3rd place)
- 2011: French Thriller Prize at Montigny-lès-Cormeilles (2nd place)
- 2011: Marseilles Thriller Prize
- 2011: Cognac Thriller Prize
- 2011: Popular Novel Prize at Elven, Morbihan
- 2011: Prix Plume-Libre
- 2011: Crystal Pen Prize at the Detective Novel Festival at Liège.
- 2014: "critiques-libres.com" Prize (14,000-member literature website)
- 2015: Prix Domitys (Prix des Maisons de Retraite)
- 2021: Best Translated Honkaku Mystery of the Decade (2010-2019) (finalist)

=== Un avion sans elle ===
- 2012: Prix Maison de la Presse ("Publishers' Award")
- 2012: Prix du polar francophone, Montigny-lès-Cormeilles
- 2012: Prix du roman populaire, Elven, Morbihan
- 2012: Prix "à chacun son histoire" ("Everyone has a story"), Estaimpuis, Belgium
- 2012: Grand Prix de littérature policière (finalist)
- 2012: Prix Polar de Cognac (finalist)
- 2013: NVN Reader's Prize, le Noir du Val Noir, Vaugneray
- 2014: Prix Dupuy (lycée Dupuy de Lôme)

=== Ne lâche pas ma main ===
- 2013: Book of the Month, May, Europe 1/Relay Travellers' Prize
- 2013: Prix du roman insulaire, salon du livre insulaire d'Ouessant, "Crime" category
- 2013: Prix des lecteurs "Voyage au cœur du polar", bibliothèque de Mesnil-Esnard.
- 2013: Grand Prix de littérature policière (finalist)
- 2013: Prix Interpol'art (finalist)
- 2013: Prix Polar de Cognac (finalist)
- 2014: Pays de Pouzauges Literary Prize
- 2014: Murderer's Pen Prize (French: Prix "la Plume Martraise") Martres-Tolosane
