= Arz (river) =

River in France

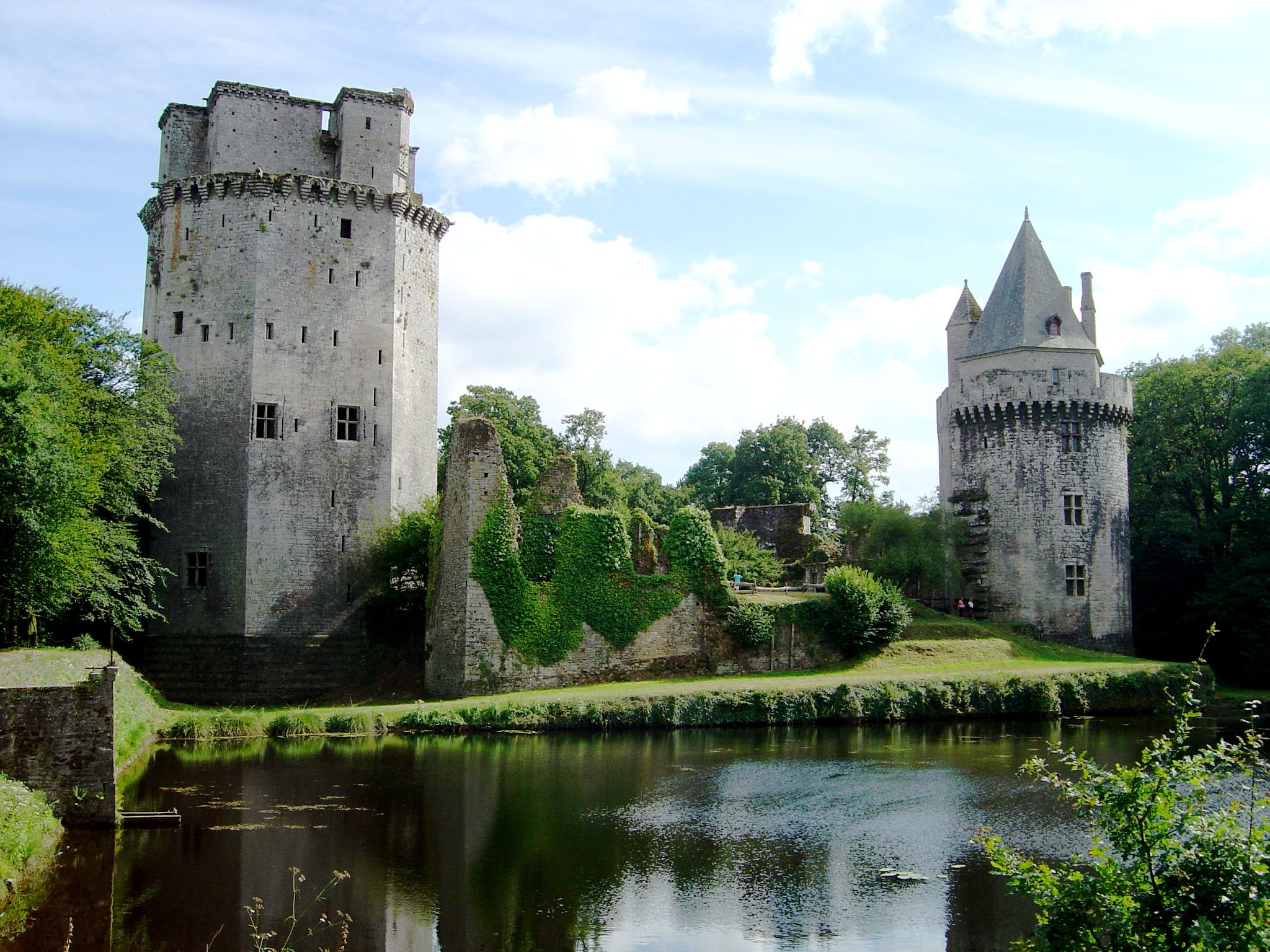

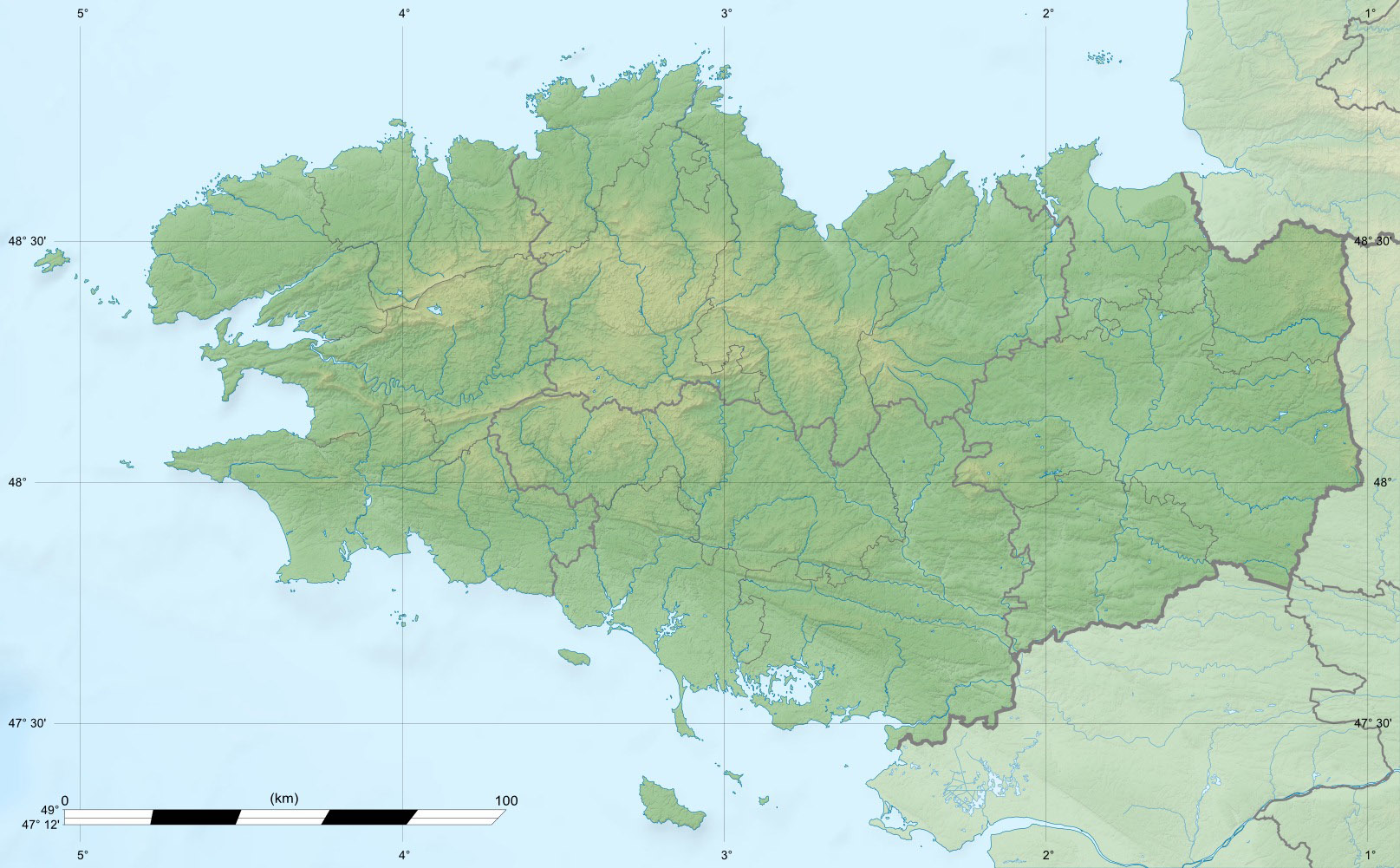
- Location within France Location within Brittany

Location
- Country: France

Physical characteristics
- Source
  - location: Plaudren
  - coordinates: 47°44′35″N 02°43′52″W
  - elevation: 130 m (430 ft)
- Mouth
  - location: Oust
  - coordinates: 47°39′21″N 02°06′40″W
  - elevation: 2 metres (6.6 ft)
- Length: 66.4 km (41.3 mi)
- Basin size: 270 km^{2} (100 sq mi)
- Discharge
  - average: 2.26 m^{3}/s (80 cu ft/s)

Basin features
- Progression: Oust→ Vilaine→ Atlantic Ocean

The Arz (Breton: Aer) is a 66.4 km (41.3 mi) long river in the Morbihan département, northwestern France. Its source is at Plaudren. It flows generally east-southeast. It is a right tributary of the Oust into which it flows at Saint-Jean-la-Poterie, near Redon.

== Communes along its course ==
This list is ordered from source to mouth: Plaudren, Monterblanc, Elven, Le Cours, Larré, Molac, Pluherlin, Malansac, Saint-Gravé, Peillac, Saint-Jacut-les-Pins, Saint-Vincent-sur-Oust, Allaire, Saint-Perreux, Saint-Jean-la-Poterie
