= Berric =

Commune in Brittany, France

Berric Berrig
- Commune
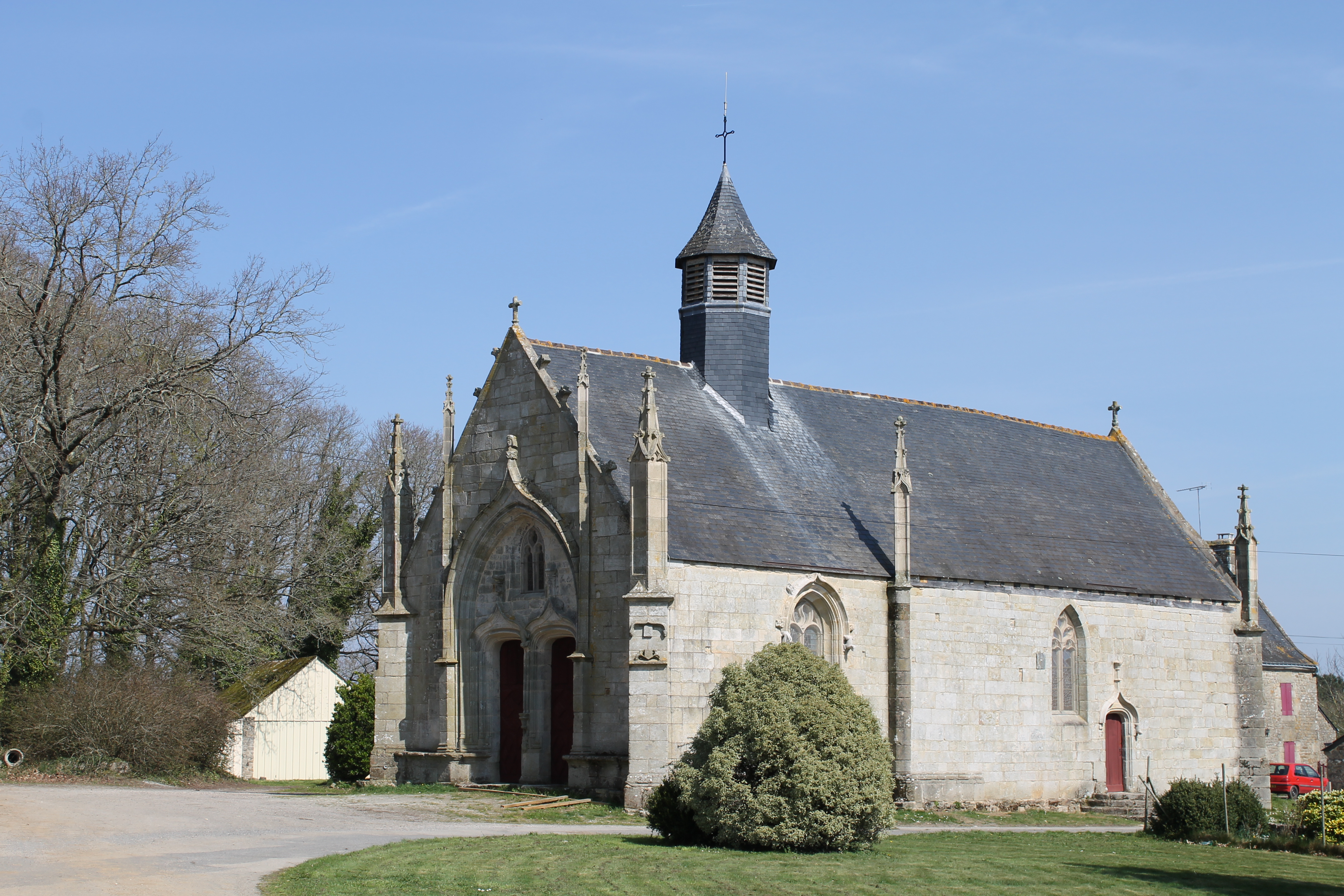
- The Chapel of Notre-Dame-des-Vertus, in Berric

- Coat of arms
- Location of Berric
- Location within France Location within Brittany
- Coordinates: 47°37′59″N 2°31′28″W
- Country: France
- Region: Brittany
- Department: Morbihan
- Arrondissement: Vannes
- Canton: Questembert
- Intercommunality: Questembert Communauté

Government
  - Mayor (2026–32): Michel Grignon
- Area^{1}: 21.45 km^{2} (8.28 sq mi)
- Highest elevation: 122 m (400 ft)
- Lowest elevation: 24 m (79 ft)
- Population (2023): 2,129
  - Density: 99.25/km^{2} (257.1/sq mi)
- Time zone: UTC+01:00 (CET)
  - Summer (DST): UTC+02:00 (CEST)
- INSEE/Postal code: 56015 /56230
- ^{1} French Land Register data, which excludes lakes, ponds, glaciers > 1 km^{2} (0.386 sq mi or 247 acres) and river estuaries.

Berric (French pronunciation: [beʁik]; Breton: Berrig) is a commune in the Morbihan department in Brittany in northwestern France.

== Population ==
Historical population
| Year | Pop. | ±% p.a. |
|---|---|---|
| 1968 | 725 | — |
| 1975 | 698 | −0.54% |
| 1982 | 814 | +2.22% |
| 1990 | 816 | +0.03% |
| 1999 | 1,027 | +2.59% |
| 2007 | 1,428 | +4.21% |
| 2012 | 1,642 | +2.83% |
| 2017 | 1,904 | +3.01% |
| 2023 | 2,129 | +1.88% |
Source: INSEE

Inhabitants of Berric are called Berricois in French.

== See also ==
- Communes of the Morbihan department
