= Limerzel =

Commune in Brittany, France

Limerzel Lizmerzher
- Commune
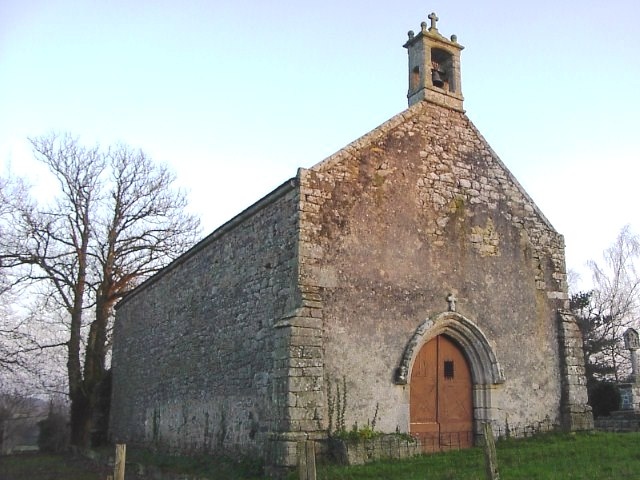
- The chapel in Limerzel
- Location of Limerzel
- Location within France Location within Brittany
- Coordinates: 47°38′15″N 2°21′09″W
- Country: France
- Region: Brittany
- Department: Morbihan
- Arrondissement: Vannes
- Canton: Questembert
- Intercommunality: Questembert Communauté

Government
  - Mayor (2026–32): Serge Lubert
- Area^{1}: 25.15 km^{2} (9.71 sq mi)
- Highest elevation: 98 m (322 ft)
- Lowest elevation: 2 m (6.6 ft)
- Population (2023): 1,370
  - Density: 54.5/km^{2} (141/sq mi)
- Time zone: UTC+01:00 (CET)
  - Summer (DST): UTC+02:00 (CEST)
- INSEE/Postal code: 56111 /56220
- ^{1} French Land Register data, which excludes lakes, ponds, glaciers > 1 km^{2} (0.386 sq mi or 247 acres) and river estuaries.

Limerzel (French pronunciation: [limɛʁzɛl]; Breton: Lizmerzher) is a commune in the Morbihan department of Brittany in north-western France.

== Demographics ==
Inhabitants of Limerzel are called in French Limerzelais.

== See also ==
- Communes of the Morbihan department
