= Malansac =

Commune in Brittany, France

Malansac Malañseg
- Commune
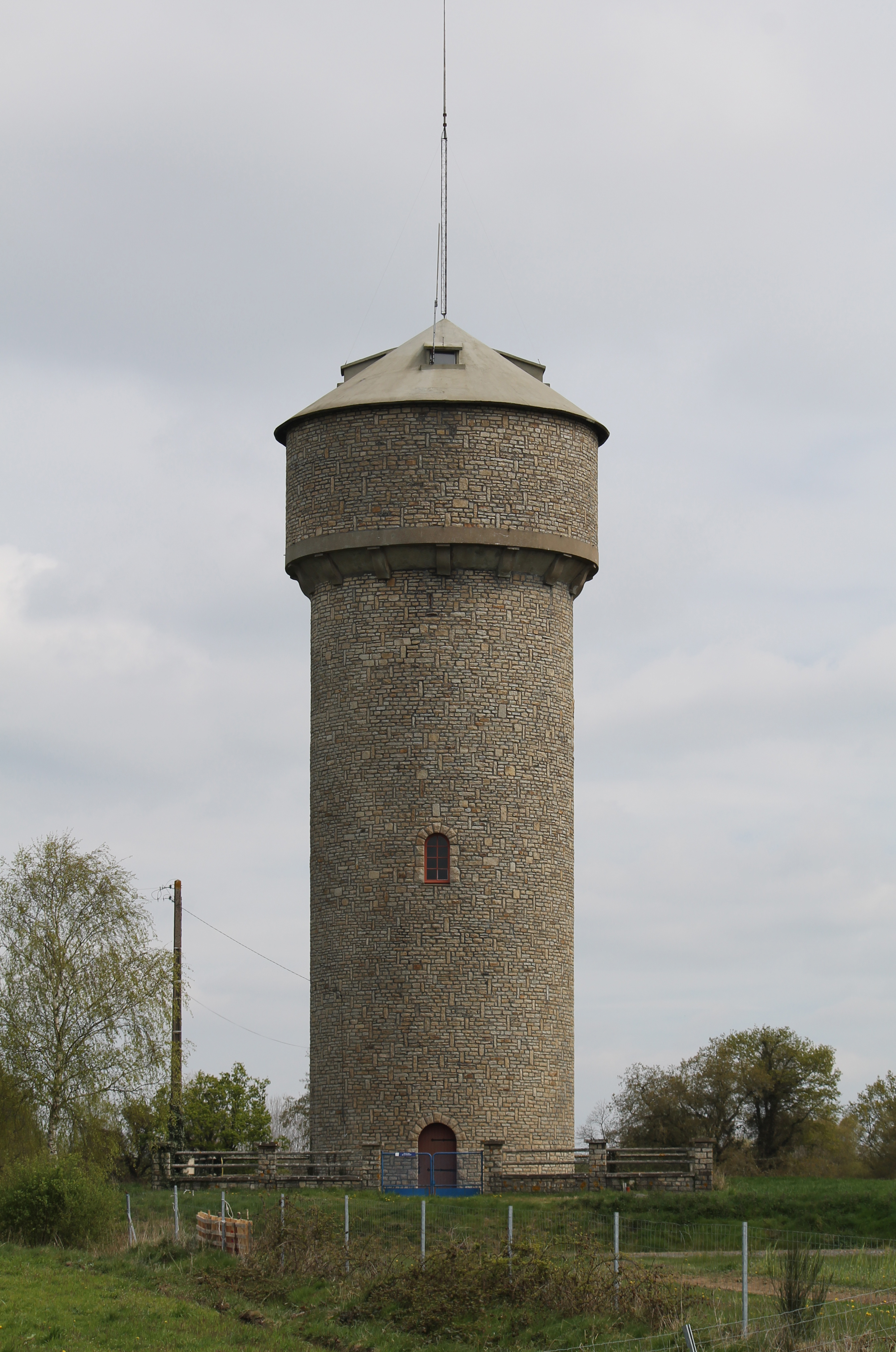
- The water tower, in Malansac
- Location of Malansac
- Location within France Location within Brittany
- Coordinates: 47°40′43″N 2°17′37″W
- Country: France
- Region: Brittany
- Department: Morbihan
- Arrondissement: Vannes
- Canton: Questembert

Government
  - Mayor (2026–32): Morgane Rétho
- Area^{1}: 36.18 km^{2} (13.97 sq mi)
- Highest elevation: 97 m (318 ft)
- Lowest elevation: 6 m (20 ft)
- Population (2023): 2,339
  - Density: 64.65/km^{2} (167.4/sq mi)
- Time zone: UTC+01:00 (CET)
  - Summer (DST): UTC+02:00 (CEST)
- INSEE/Postal code: 56123 /56220
- ^{1} French Land Register data, which excludes lakes, ponds, glaciers > 1 km^{2} (0.386 sq mi or 247 acres) and river estuaries.

Malansac (French pronunciation: [malɑ̃sak]; Breton: Malañseg) is a commune in the Morbihan department of Brittany in north-western France.

== Geography ==
The river Arz forms all of the commune's northern border.

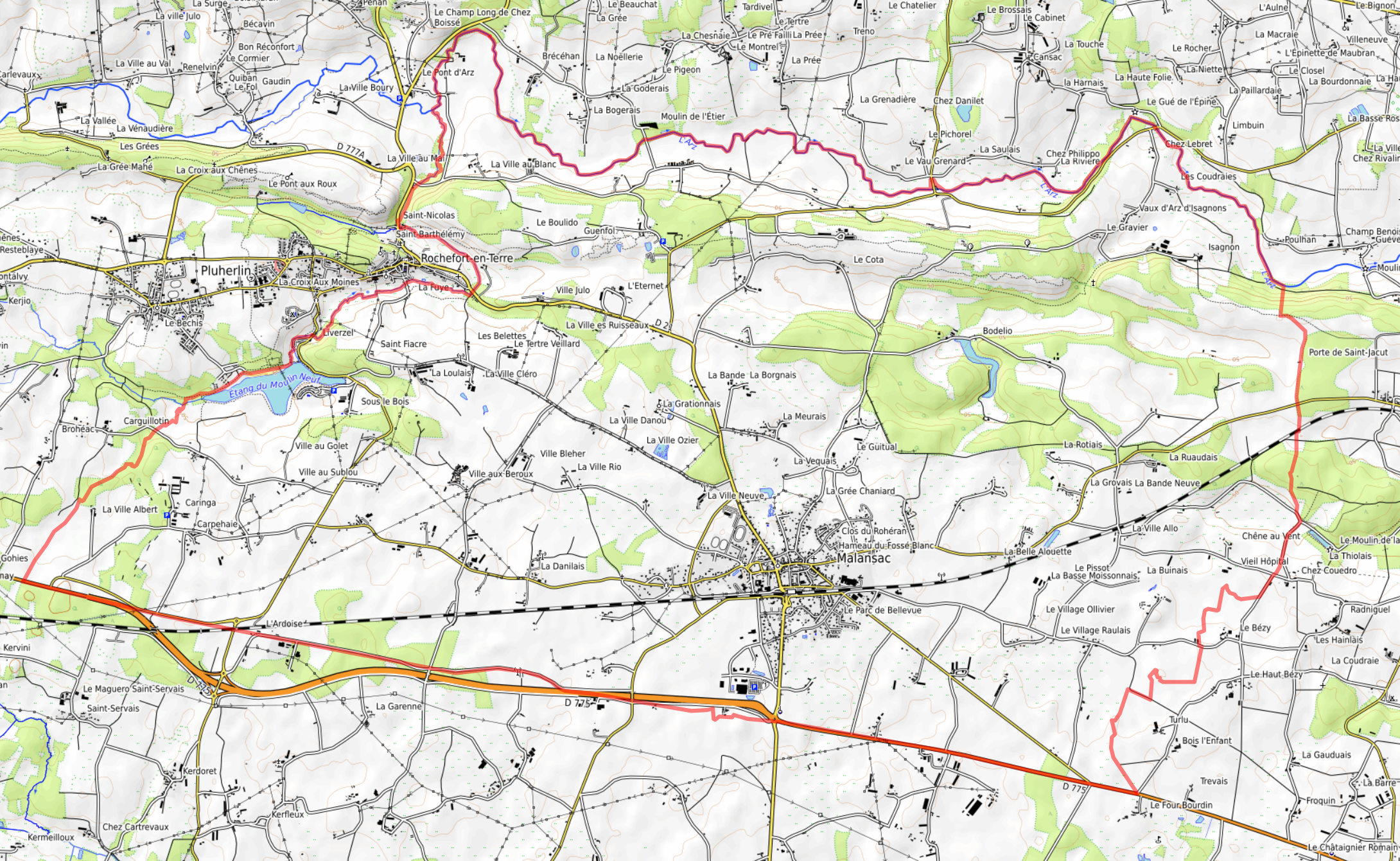
Topographic map

== Population ==
Historical population
Year	Pop.	±% p.a.
1968	1,899	—
1975	1,913	+0.10%
1982	1,896	−0.13%
1990	1,894	−0.01%
1999	1,889	−0.03%
2007	1,999	+0.71%
2012	2,145	+1.42%
2017	2,202	+0.53%
2023	2,339	+1.01%
Source: INSEE

Inhabitants of Malansac are called in French Malansacais.

== See also ==
- Communes of the Morbihan department
