= Molac =

Molac Moulleg
- Commune
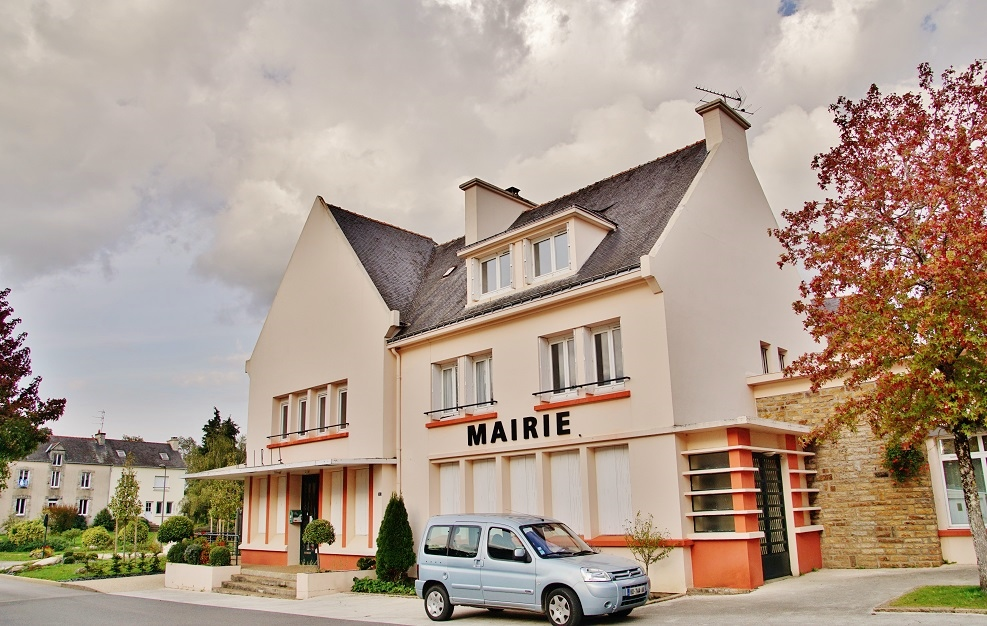
- Town hall

- Coat of arms
- Location of Molac
- Location within France Location within Brittany
- Coordinates: 47°43′52″N 2°26′01″W
- Country: France
- Region: Brittany
- Department: Morbihan
- Arrondissement: Vannes
- Canton: Questembert
- Intercommunality: Questembert Communauté

Government
  - Mayor (2026–32): Marcel Ars
- Area^{1}: 28.40 km^{2} (10.97 sq mi)
- Highest elevation: 106 m (348 ft)
- Lowest elevation: 22 m (72 ft)
- Population (2023): 1,633
  - Density: 57.50/km^{2} (148.9/sq mi)
- Time zone: UTC+01:00 (CET)
  - Summer (DST): UTC+02:00 (CEST)
- INSEE/Postal code: 56135 /56230
- ^{1} French Land Register data, which excludes lakes, ponds, glaciers > 1 km^{2} (0.386 sq mi or 247 acres) and river estuaries.

Molac (French pronunciation: [mɔlak]; Breton: Moulleg) is a commune in the Morbihan department of Brittany in north-western France.

== Geography ==
The river Arz forms most of the commune's south-western border, then flows eastward through the south-eastern part of the commune. Molac is located in the heart of a forest-covered region called in French the Landes de Lanvaux. The village centre is located 25 km (16 mi) east of Vannes.

== Map ==
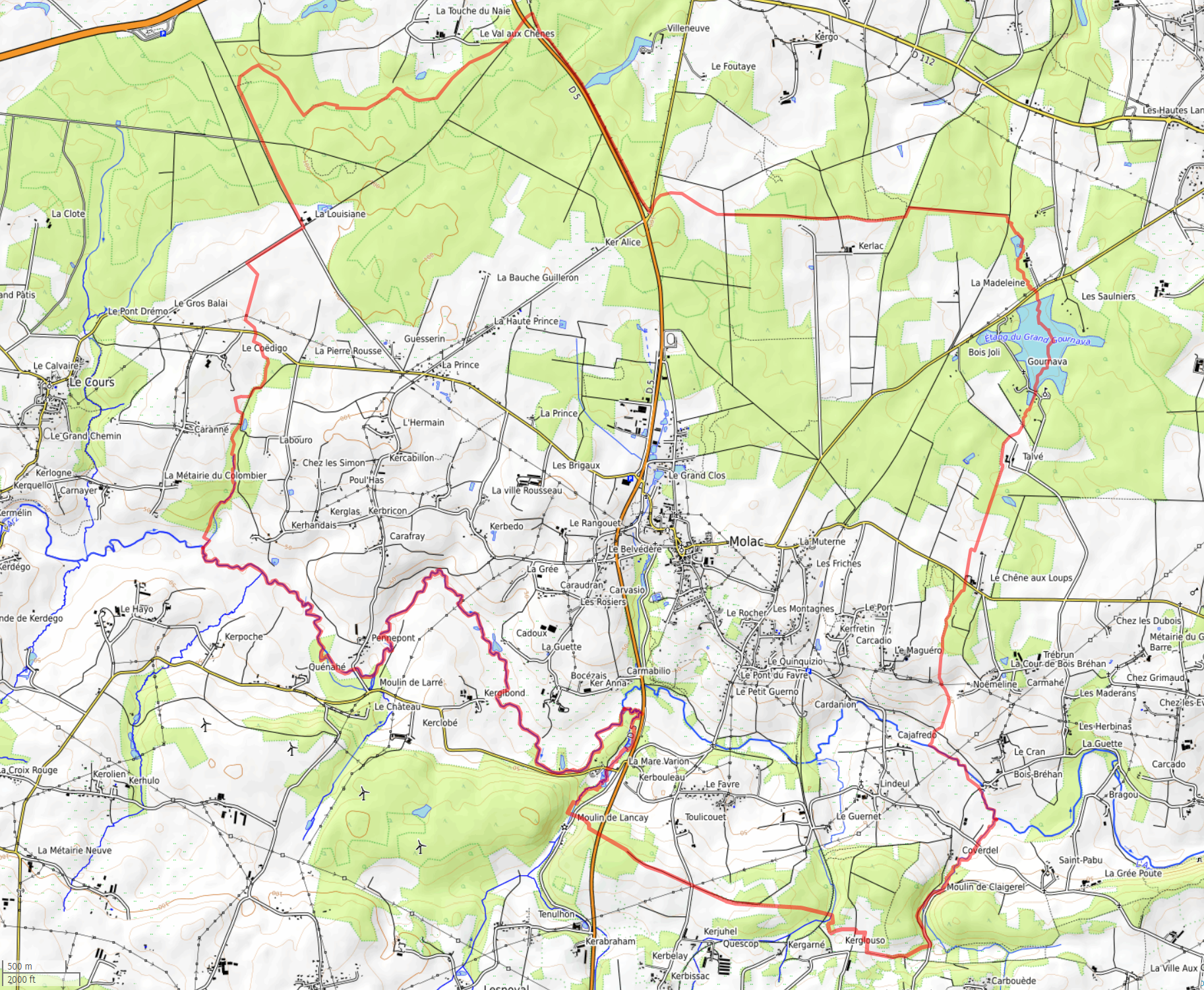
Topographic map.

== Demographics ==
Inhabitants of Molac are called in French Molacais or Molacois.

== See also ==
- Communes of the Morbihan department
