= Saint-Gravé =

Saint-Gravé Sant-Gravez
- Commune
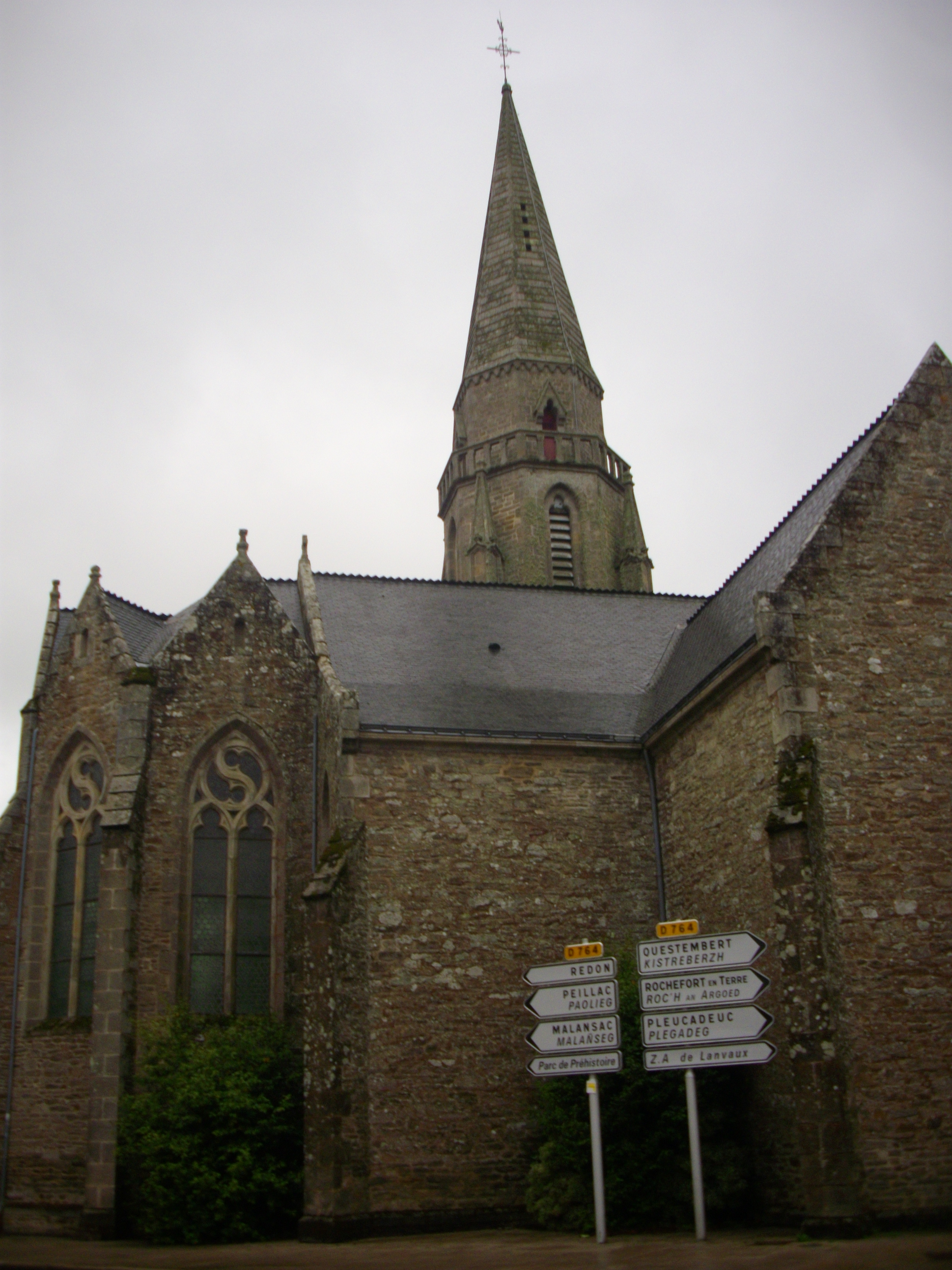
- Saint Dionysius church of Saint-Gravé.

- Coat of arms
- Location of Saint-Gravé
- Location within France Location within Brittany
- Coordinates: 47°43′36″N 2°16′46″W
- Country: France
- Region: Brittany
- Department: Morbihan
- Arrondissement: Vannes
- Canton: Questembert

Government
  - Mayor (2026–32): Thierry Autran
- Area^{1}: 15.75 km^{2} (6.08 sq mi)
- Highest elevation: 91 m (299 ft)
- Lowest elevation: 2 m (6.6 ft)
- Population (2023): 763
  - Density: 48.4/km^{2} (125/sq mi)
- Time zone: UTC+01:00 (CET)
  - Summer (DST): UTC+02:00 (CEST)
- INSEE/Postal code: 56218 /56220
- ^{1} French Land Register data, which excludes lakes, ponds, glaciers > 1 km^{2} (0.386 sq mi or 247 acres) and river estuaries.

Saint-Gravé (French pronunciation: [sɛ̃ ɡʁave]; Breton: Sant-Gravez) is a commune in the Morbihan department of Brittany in northwestern France.

== Geography ==
The canal de Nantes à Brest forms part of the commune's northern border; the river Arz forms all of its southern border.

== Demographics ==
Inhabitants of Saint-Gravé are called Gravéens in French.

== See also ==
- Communes of the Morbihan department
