= Plaudren =

Plaudren Plaodren
- Commune
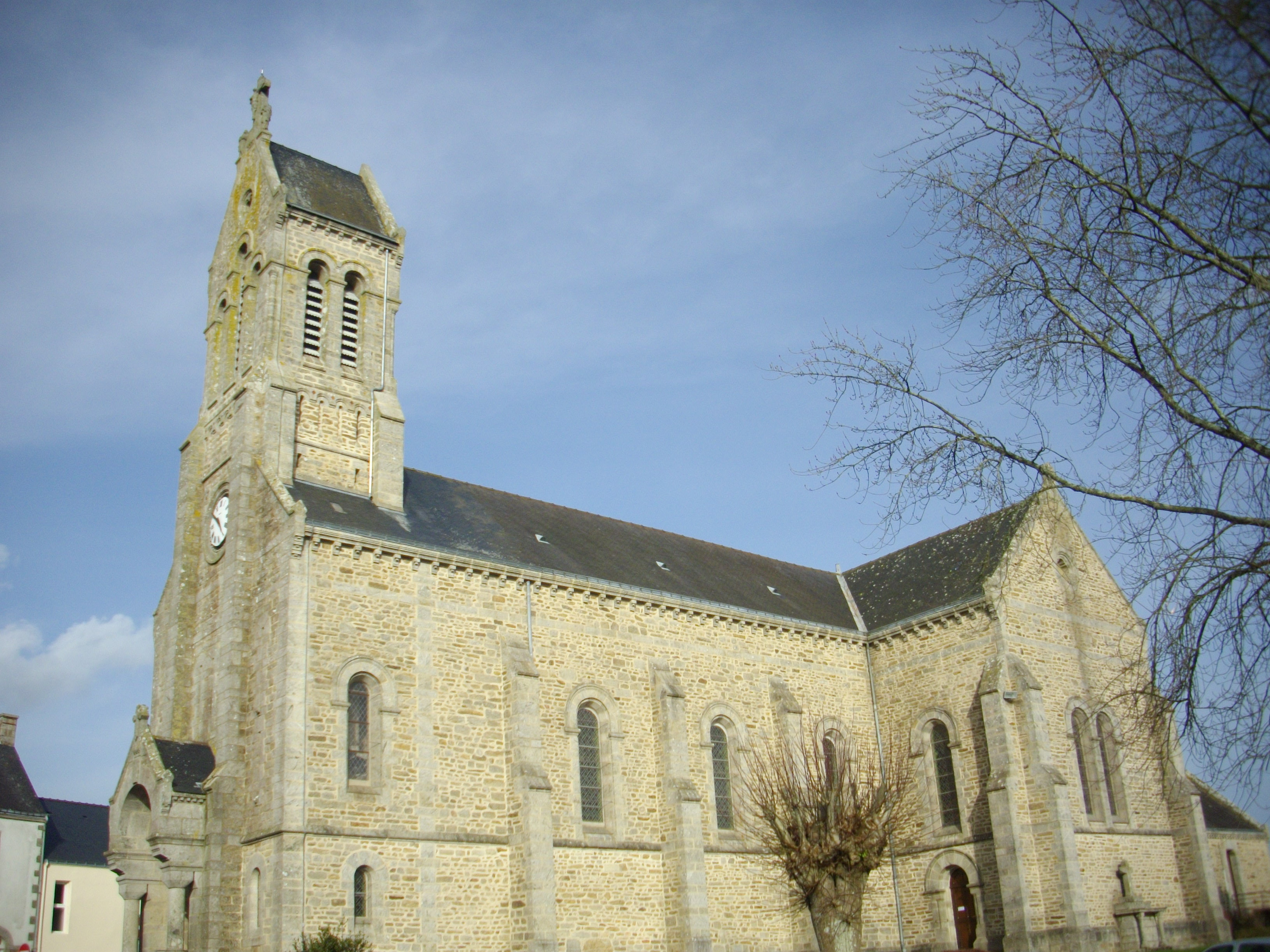
- The church in Plaudren
- Location of Plaudren
- Location within France Location within Brittany
- Coordinates: 47°46′47″N 2°41′29″W
- Country: France
- Region: Brittany
- Department: Morbihan
- Arrondissement: Vannes
- Canton: Grand-Champ
- Intercommunality: Golfe du Morbihan - Vannes Agglomération

Government
  - Mayor (2026–32): Nathalie Le Luherne
- Area^{1}: 41.07 km^{2} (15.86 sq mi)
- Highest elevation: 154 m (505 ft)
- Lowest elevation: 42 m (138 ft)
- Population (2023): 1,978
  - Density: 48.16/km^{2} (124.7/sq mi)
- Time zone: UTC+01:00 (CET)
  - Summer (DST): UTC+02:00 (CEST)
- INSEE/Postal code: 56157 /56420
- ^{1} French Land Register data, which excludes lakes, ponds, glaciers > 1 km^{2} (0.386 sq mi or 247 acres) and river estuaries.

Plaudren (French pronunciation: [plodʁɛ̃]; Breton: Plaodren) is a commune in the Morbihan department and Brittany region of north-western France. In French the inhabitants of Plaudren are known as Plaudrinois.

== Geography ==
The river Arz has its source in the commune.

== See also ==
- Communes of the Morbihan department
