= Lauzach =

Commune in Brittany, France

Lauzach Laozag
- Commune
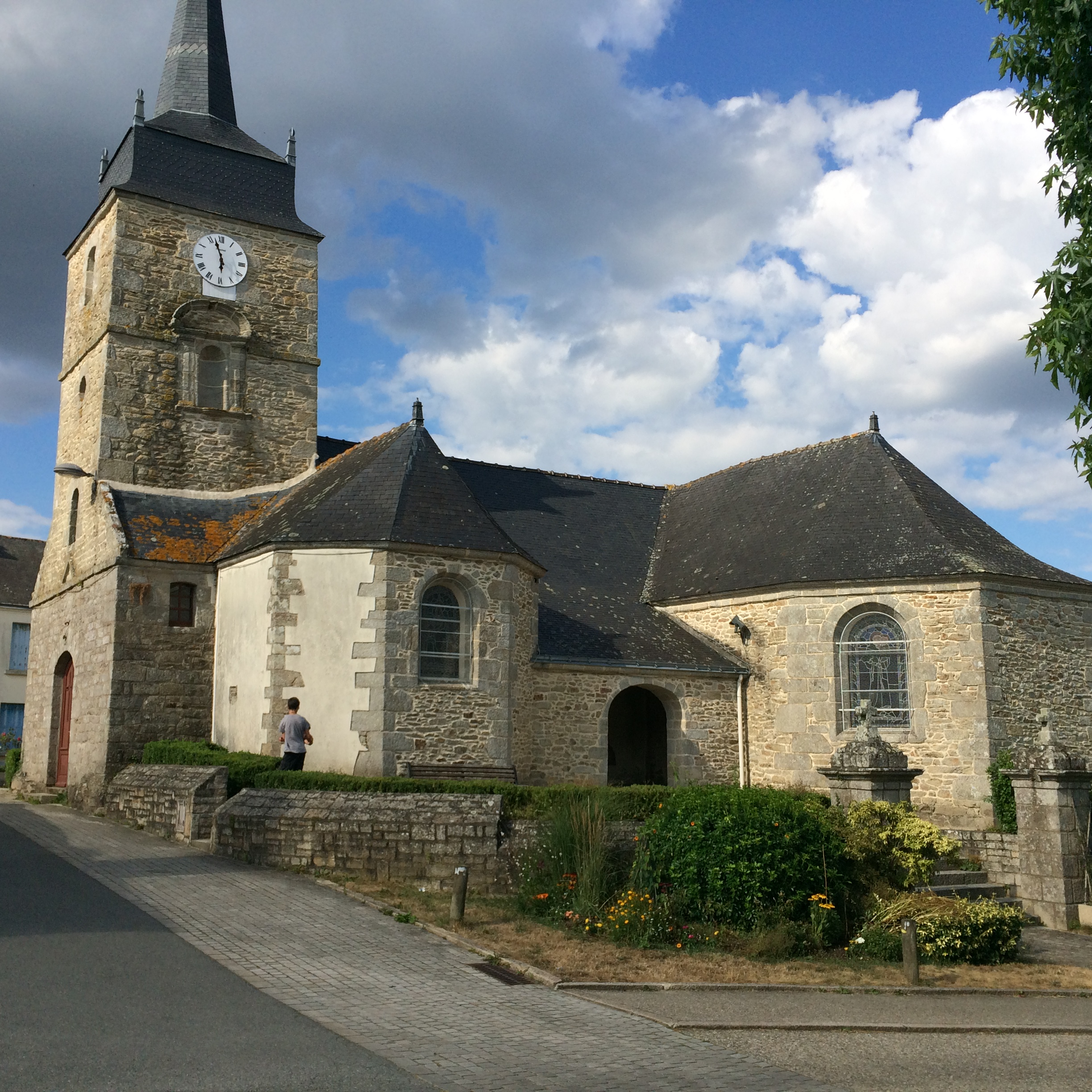
- Church Sainte-Christine.

- Coat of arms
- Location of Lauzach
- Location within France Location within Brittany
- Coordinates: 47°36′56″N 2°32′36″W
- Country: France
- Region: Brittany
- Department: Morbihan
- Arrondissement: Vannes
- Canton: Questembert
- Intercommunality: Questembert Communauté

Government
  - Mayor (2026–32): Patrice Le Penhuizic
- Area^{1}: 10.76 km^{2} (4.15 sq mi)
- Highest elevation: 63 m (207 ft)
- Lowest elevation: 17 m (56 ft)
- Population (2023): 1,264
  - Density: 117.5/km^{2} (304.3/sq mi)
- Time zone: UTC+01:00 (CET)
  - Summer (DST): UTC+02:00 (CEST)
- INSEE/Postal code: 56109 /56190
- ^{1} French Land Register data, which excludes lakes, ponds, glaciers > 1 km^{2} (0.386 sq mi or 247 acres) and river estuaries.

Lauzach (French pronunciation: [lozak]; Breton: Laozag) is a commune in the Morbihan department of Brittany in north-western France. Inhabitants of Lauzach are called in French Lauzachois.

== See also ==
- Communes of the Morbihan department
