= Tredion Castle =

Castle in Tredion, Morbihan, France

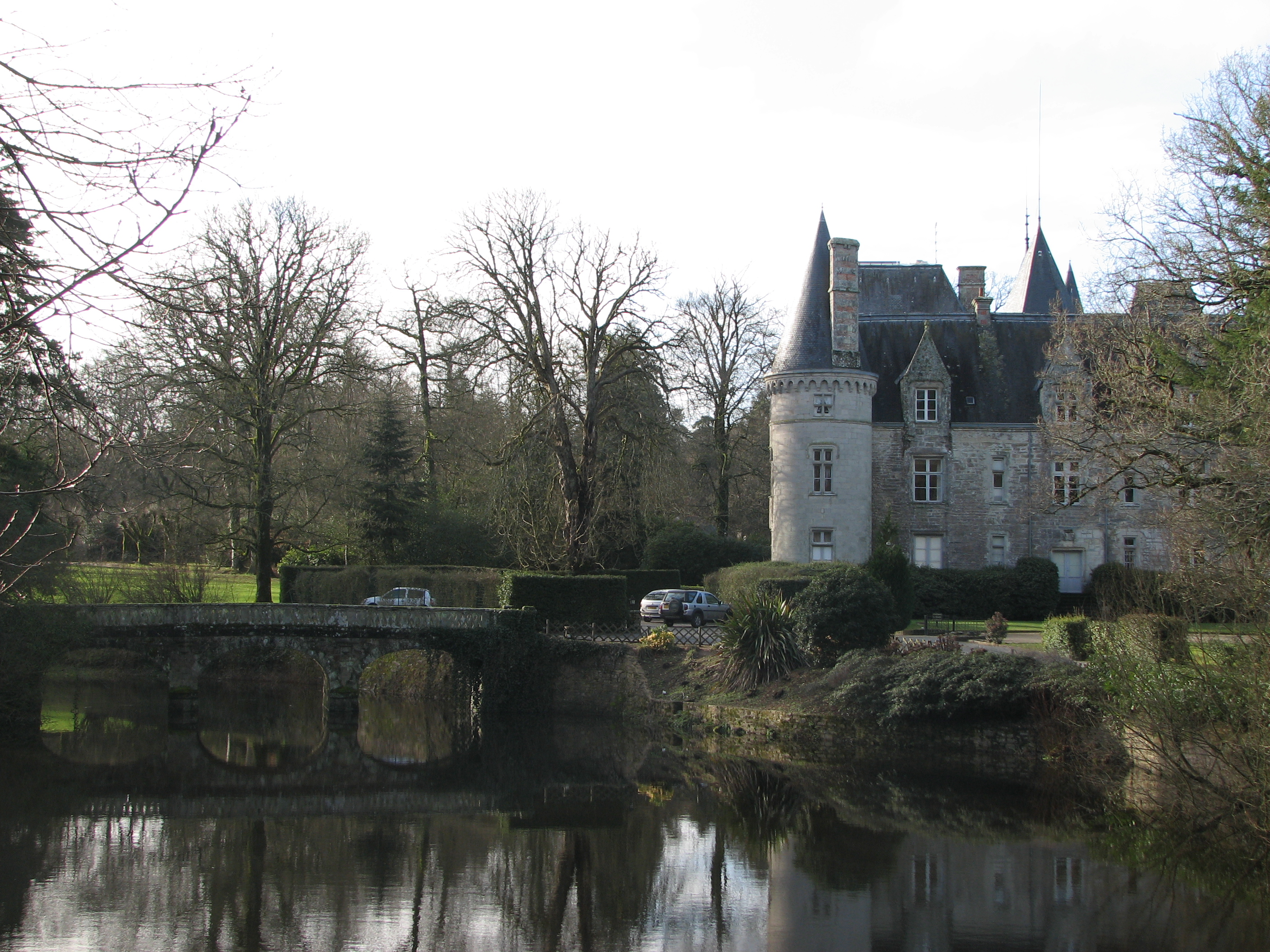

- Location within Brittany Tredion Castle (France)

General information
- Location: Tredion, Morbihan, Brittany, France
- Coordinates: 47.7933°N 2.5922°W

Tredion Castle is located in Tredion in the French department of Morbihan.

== History ==
Built in 1350, Tredion Castle belonged to the Dukes of Brittany. The vast forests that surround it made it a favourite meeting place for hunters. Great names have owned the Tredion estate over the centuries. Amongst them, the Malestroits, Jean IV de Rieux, the Marquis de Nesle, Guy-Paul de Coligny, the Princess of Salm, Pierre II de Sérent, Charles Fouquet in 1683, distant relative of the intendant Fouquet, who was at the origin of the legend of the Treasure of Tredion that was said to be buried at the foot of an oak tree... A series of bourgeois and lesser nobility then owned the castle.

Tredion castle was host to illustrious owners during this period, but even more illustrious guests were to follow. King François I who on 9 August 1518 dined and stayed in the "Castle" for one night, before travelling the next day to Vannes, at the time a "Small City of 9,000 souls". The Queen mother "Catherine de'Medici" regent of the Kingdom of France and hostess of the Coligny family, stayed in the castle for at least two weeks in May 1570 (two letters written from Tredion testify to this fact).

On 21 July 1834, Hippolyte du Fresne of Virel acquired Tredion Castle and its land. In 1840 he built a "furnace" to make cast iron objects, and undertook restoration works making transform the manor into a "Castle".

In 1977, the estate was sold by the heirs of Virel to Guy Turpin, a property developer in Vannes. Large-scale renovation works were undertaken, both in the castle and in the gardens, and are still in progress to this day.

== Park and gardens ==
The gardens designed in 19th century around the year 1820, with their irregular central path, artificial river, cascade, pond, lake and kitchen garden and orchard are listed in the pre-inventory of remarkable gardens.
