= Caden =

Commune in the Morbihan department of Brittany in north-western France

Caden Kaden
- Commune
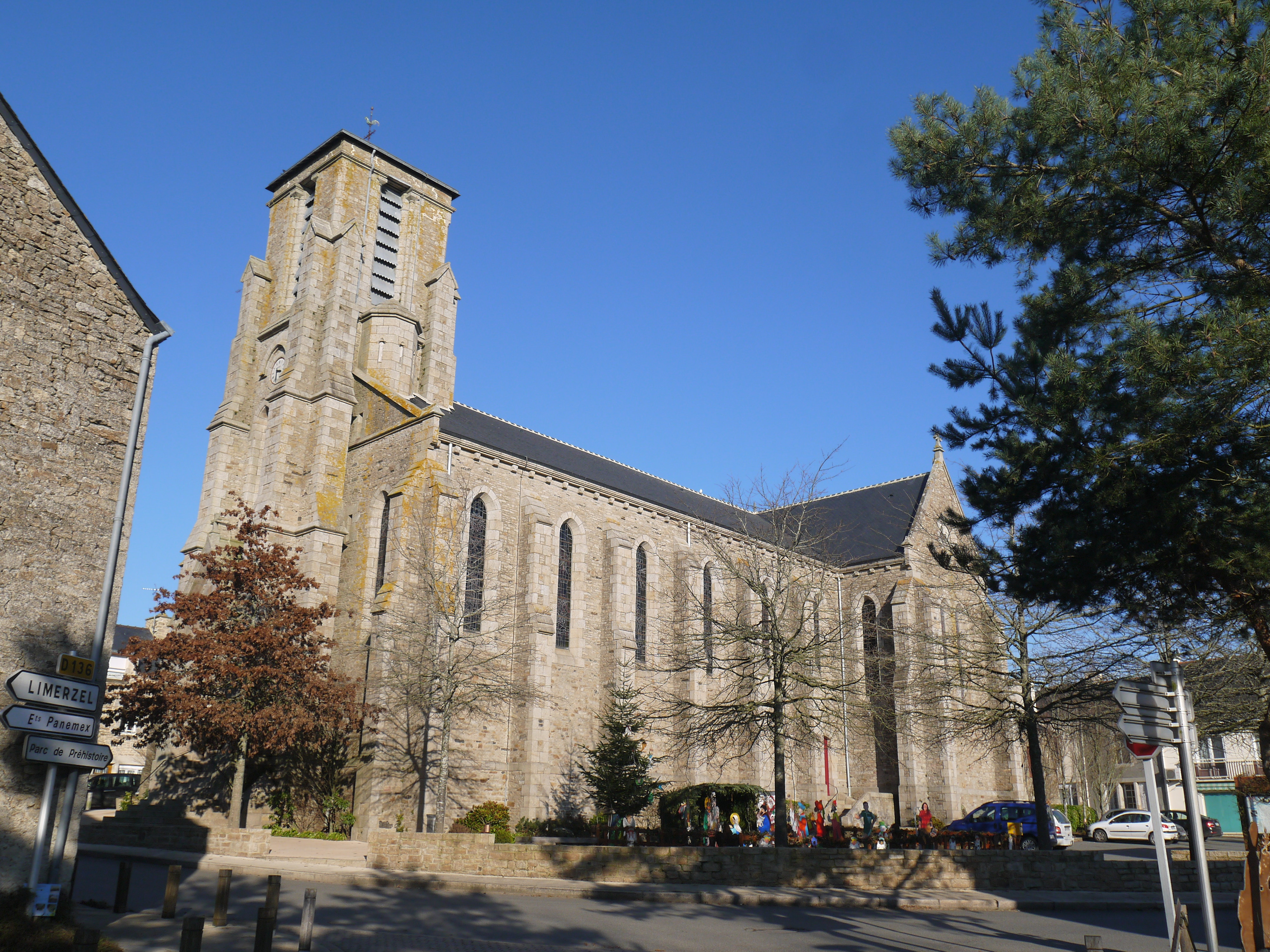
- Church of Saint-Pierre-ès-Liens in Caden.

- Coat of arms
- Location of Caden
- Location within France Location within Brittany
- Coordinates: 47°37′54″N 2°17′11″W
- Country: France
- Region: Brittany
- Department: Morbihan
- Arrondissement: Vannes
- Canton: Questembert
- Intercommunality: Questembert Communauté

Government
  - Mayor (2026–32): Claire Mahé
- Area^{1}: 38.10 km^{2} (14.71 sq mi)
- Highest elevation: 91 m (299 ft)
- Lowest elevation: 1 m (3.3 ft)
- Population (2023): 1,641
  - Density: 43.07/km^{2} (111.6/sq mi)
- Time zone: UTC+01:00 (CET)
  - Summer (DST): UTC+02:00 (CEST)
- INSEE/Postal code: 56028 /56220
- ^{1} French Land Register data, which excludes lakes, ponds, glaciers > 1 km^{2} (0.386 sq mi or 247 acres) and river estuaries.

Caden (French pronunciation: [kadɛ̃]; Breton: Kaden) is a commune in the Morbihan department of Brittany in north-western France.

== Demographics ==
Inhabitants of Caden are called in French Cadenais.

== See also ==
- Communes of the Morbihan department
