= Saint-Jean-la-Poterie =

Saint-Jean-la-Poterie Sant-Yann-ar-Wern
- Commune
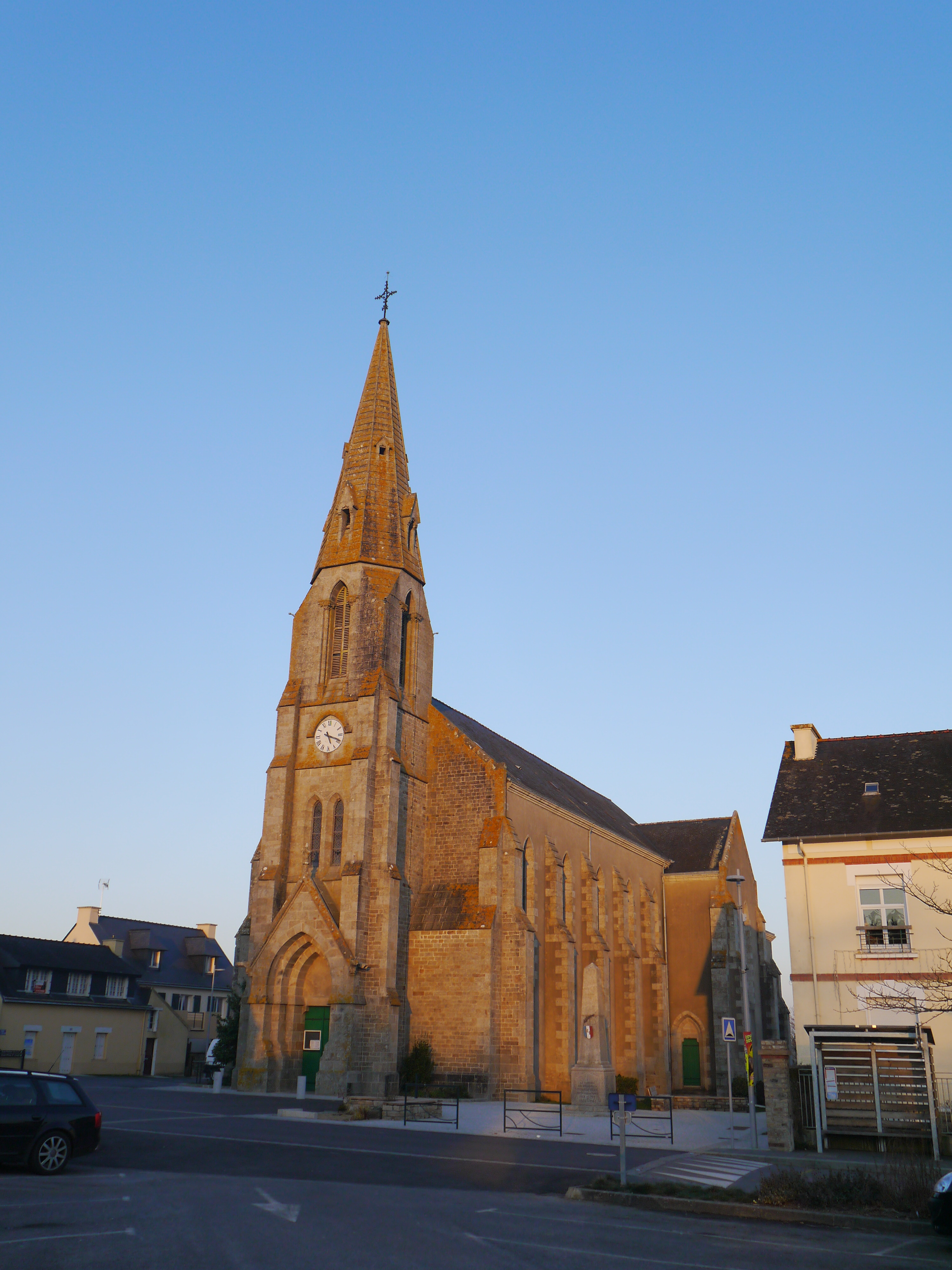
- The church of Saint John the Baptist.
- Location of Saint-Jean-la-Poterie
- Location within France Location within Brittany
- Coordinates: 47°38′14″N 2°07′29″W
- Country: France
- Region: Brittany
- Department: Morbihan
- Arrondissement: Vannes
- Canton: Guer
- Intercommunality: Redon Agglomération

Government
  - Mayor (2026–32): Alexis Matull
- Area^{1}: 8.44 km^{2} (3.26 sq mi)
- Highest elevation: 81 m (266 ft)
- Lowest elevation: 1 m (3.3 ft)
- Population (2023): 1,429
  - Density: 169/km^{2} (439/sq mi)
- Time zone: UTC+01:00 (CET)
  - Summer (DST): UTC+02:00 (CEST)
- INSEE/Postal code: 56223 /56350
- ^{1} French Land Register data, which excludes lakes, ponds, glaciers > 1 km^{2} (0.386 sq mi or 247 acres) and river estuaries.

Saint-Jean-la-Poterie (French pronunciation: [sɛ̃ ʒɑ̃ la pɔtʁi]; Breton: Sant-Yann-ar-Wern) is a commune in the Morbihan department of Brittany in north-western France.

== Geography ==
The river Arz forms part of the commune's northern border, then flows into the Oust, which forms most of its eastern boundary.

== Demographics ==
Inhabitants of Saint-Jean-la-Poterie are called in French Potians.

== See also ==
- Communes of the Morbihan department
