= Le Cours =

Commune in Brittany, France

Le Cours Ar C'hour
- Commune
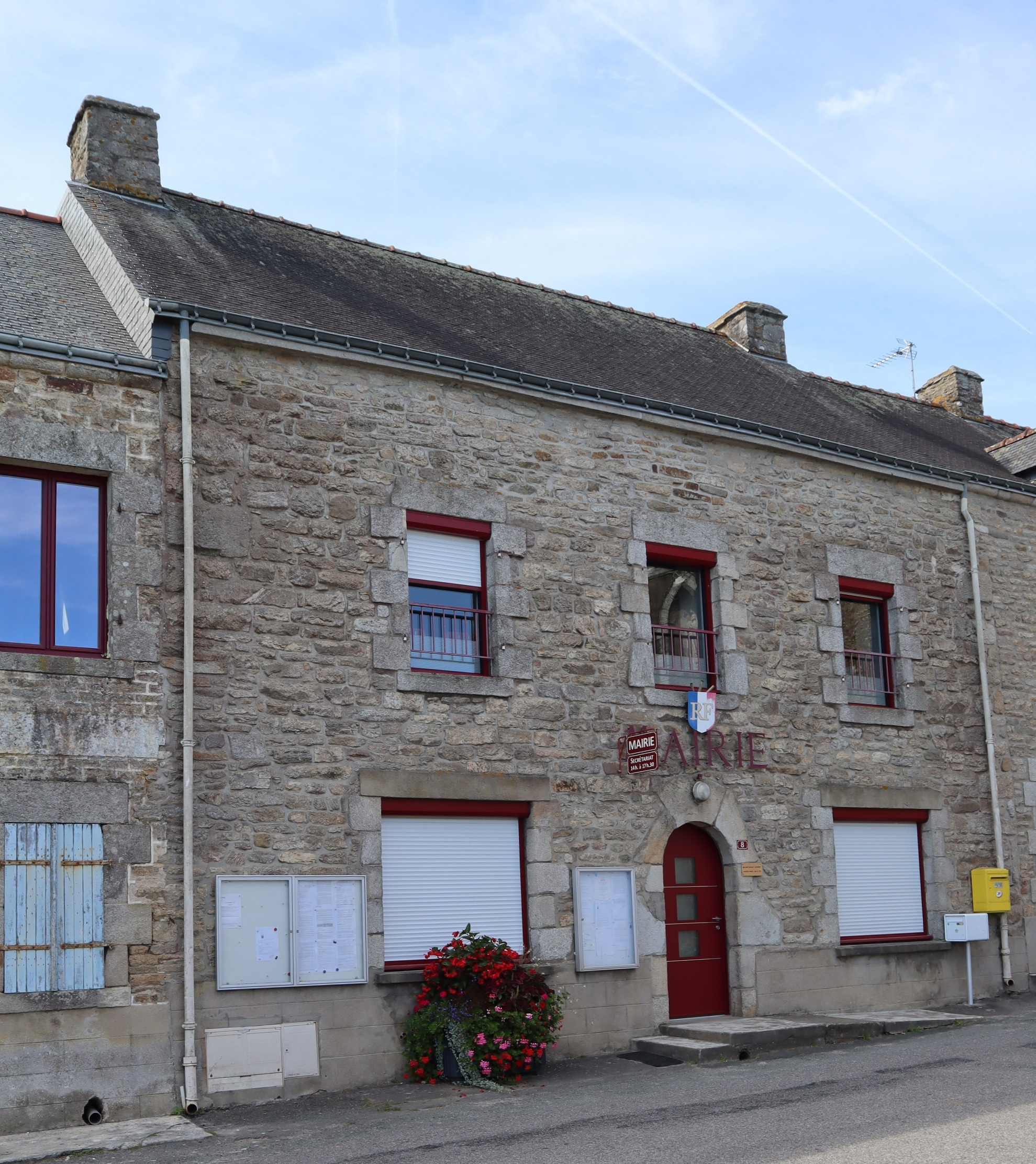
- Town hall.

- Coat of arms
- Location of Le Cours
- Location within France Location within Brittany
- Coordinates: 47°44′33″N 2°30′00″W
- Country: France
- Region: Brittany
- Department: Morbihan
- Arrondissement: Vannes
- Canton: Questembert
- Intercommunality: Questembert Communauté

Government
  - Mayor (2026–32): Raymond Houeix
- Area^{1}: 15.63 km^{2} (6.03 sq mi)
- Highest elevation: 106 m (348 ft)
- Lowest elevation: 27 m (89 ft)
- Population (2023): 697
  - Density: 44.6/km^{2} (115/sq mi)
- Time zone: UTC+01:00 (CET)
  - Summer (DST): UTC+02:00 (CEST)
- INSEE/Postal code: 56045 /56230
- ^{1} French Land Register data, which excludes lakes, ponds, glaciers > 1 km^{2} (0.386 sq mi or 247 acres) and river estuaries.

Le Cours (French pronunciation: [lə kuʁ]; Breton: Ar C'hour) is a commune in the Morbihan department of Brittany in north-western France.

== Geography ==
The river Arz forms all of the commune's southern border.

== Demographics ==
Inhabitants of Le Cours are called in French Coursiens (male) or Coursiennes (female).

== See also ==
- Communes of the Morbihan department
