= Château de Largoët =

Castle in Brittany, France

Coordinates: 47°43′31″N 2°37′7″W

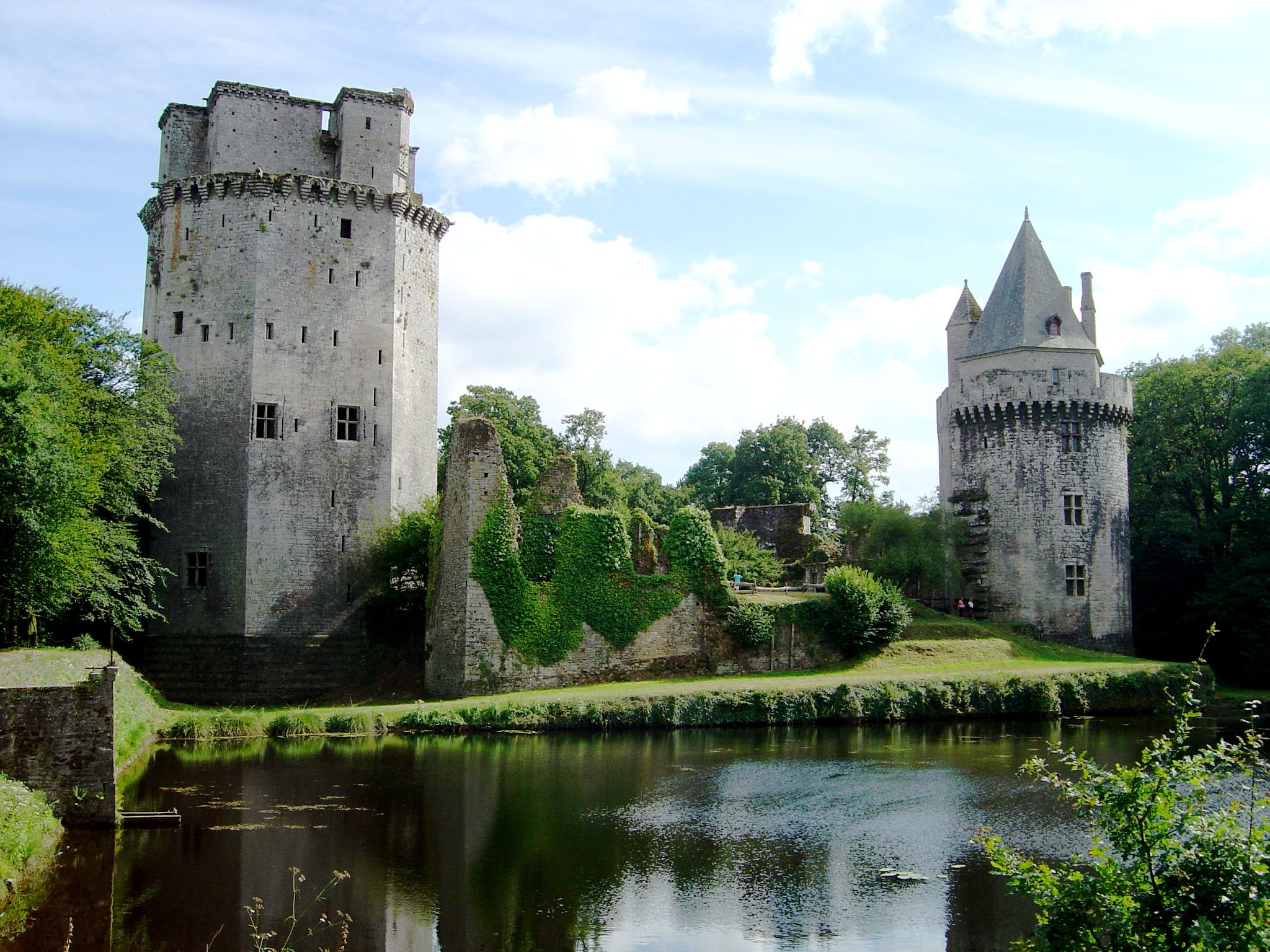
The keep and Round Tower from the lake

The Château de Largoët (French pronunciation: [ʃɑtod laʁɡoɛt]), also known as the Tours d’Elven (Elven Towers), is a medieval castle in Elven, in the Morbihan département of France, 13 km from Vannes.

== History ==
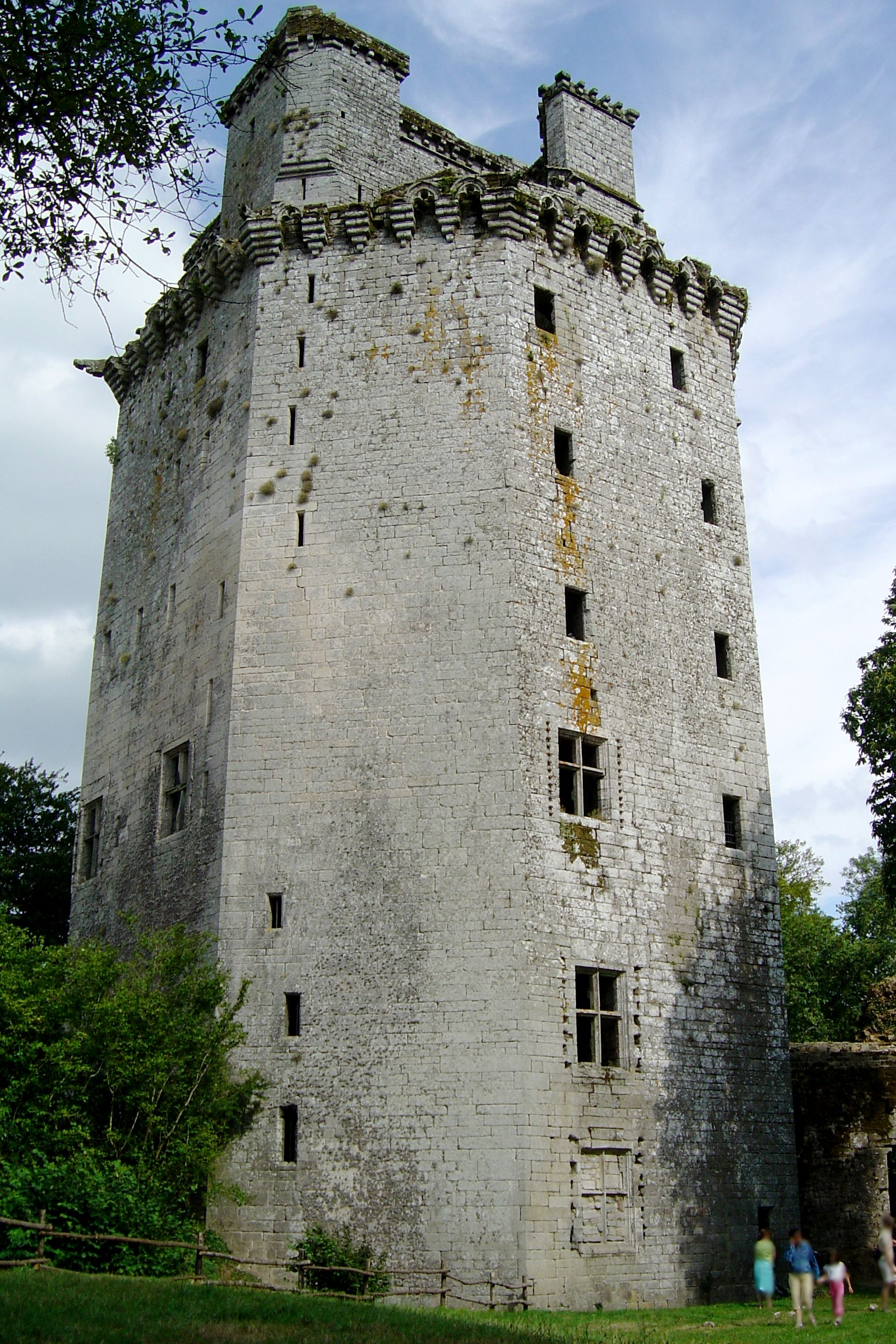
The octagonal keep

A castle is mentioned for the first time in 1020, belonging to the baron of Elven, Derrien I, but the present building was constructed between the 13th and 15th centuries. The manor became the property of the Malestroit family in the 13th century. The houses of Blois and Montfort fought for it during the Breton War of Succession, before it came to the Rieux family in the 15th century. It was during this period (between 1474 and 1476) that Jean IV, lord of Rieux, protected Henry Tudor, Duke of Richmond, future King Henry VII of England. In 1490, Charles VIII of France, dismantled the castle, but it was restored under the influence of Anne de Bretagne.

Nicolas Fouquet bought it in 1656 and, after his death, it was sold to Michel de Trémeurec and stayed in his family. In the 19th century, it was proposed to demolish Largoët, given its dilapidation, but it was saved thanks to Prosper Mérimée, who had it classed as a monument historique in 1862. Beginning in the 1970s, there has been a programme of restoration.

== Architecture ==
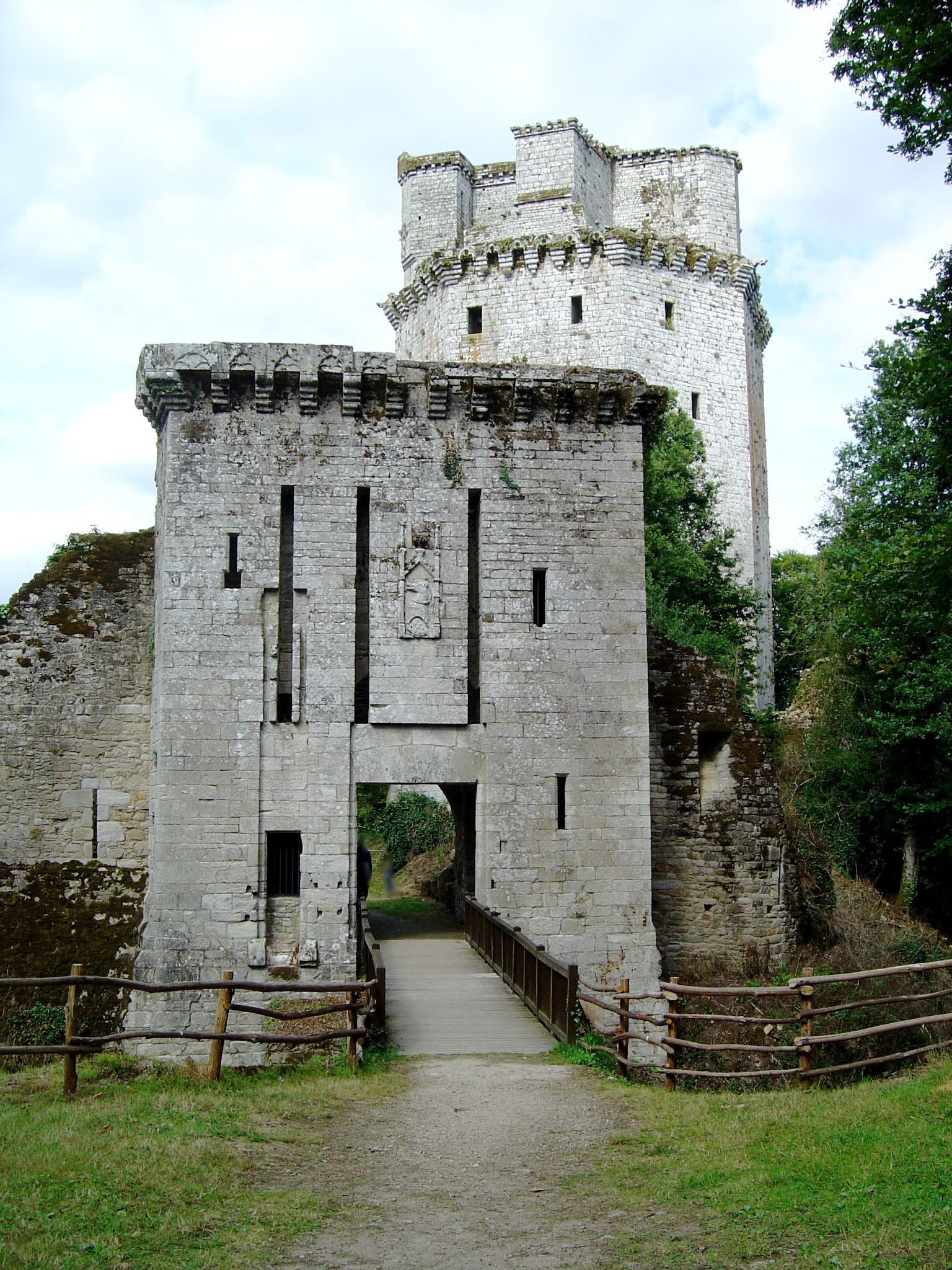
The gatehouse

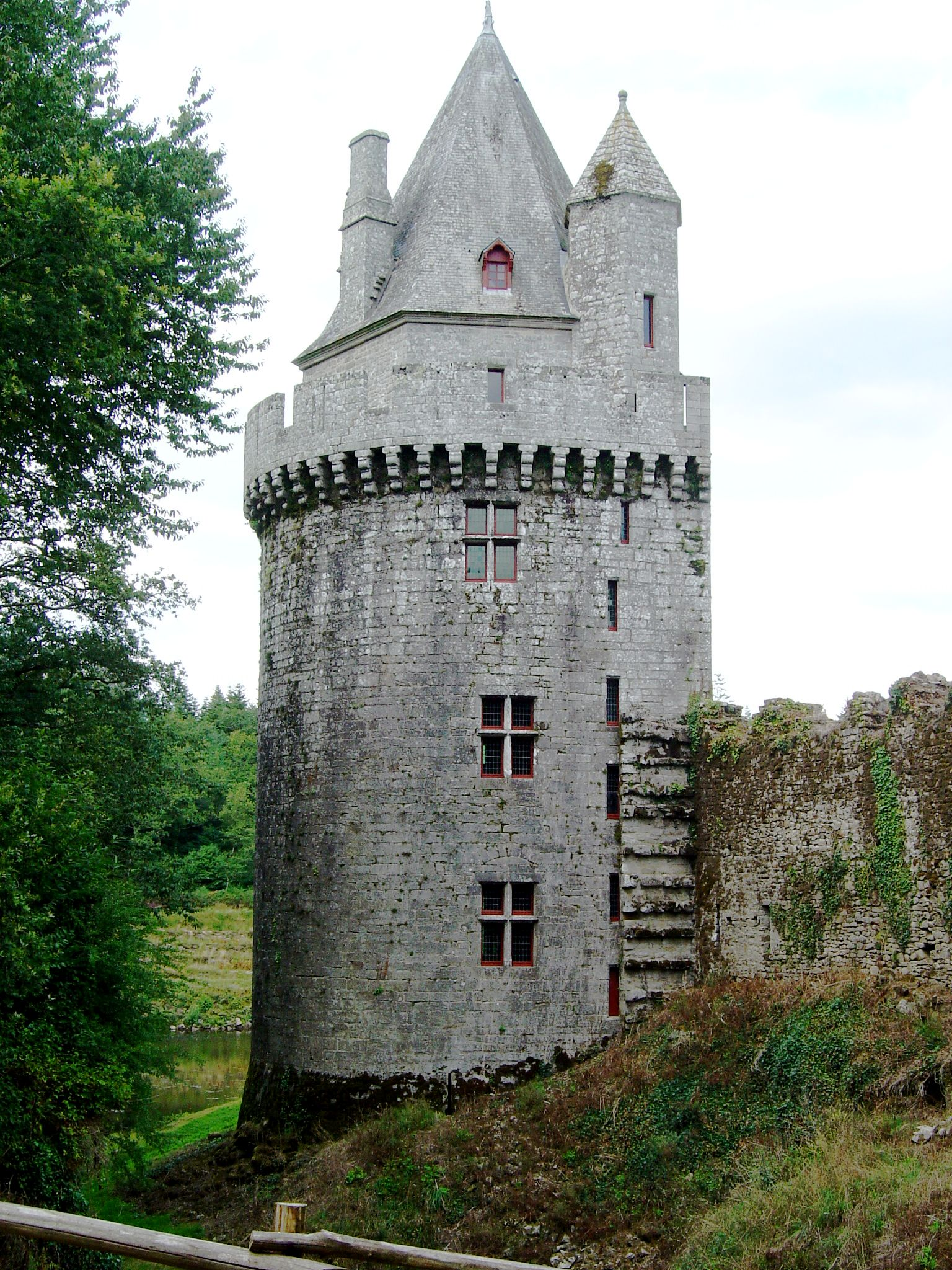
The round tower

The ruins of Largoët maintain their imposing aspect, notably because of the 14th century octagonal keep. At 45 m, it is one of the highest in France (for comparison, the keep at the Château de Vincennes reaches 52 m). There are five floors and the walls are between 6 and 10 m thick. On the sixth or seventh floor is the room where Henry Tudor stayed.

As well as this colossal edifice, Largoët also boasts:

- A 15th-century gatehouse, marking the entrance to the fortress, built against another 13th-century building.
- A round tower of three storeys, from the 15th century, with cannon openings on the first level, and covered with a hexagonal building. It was furnished in the 20th century as a hunting lodge. It has been used as a location for historical films, including Lancelot du Lac and Chouans.
- The remains of the enclosing walls, dried up moats and a lake.
- The ruins of a construction known as an ice house (glacière), used as a food store.
- The entrance to a vast cellar which was used to store wood.

== An underground mystery ==
A tunnel at one time provided an exit from the fortress, but its entrance has not been found. Works in the Lion d'Or inn, in the centre of Elven, could bring this to light.

== See also ==
- List of castles in France
