= Canton of Questembert =

Coordinates: 47.66°N 2.45°W

The canton of Questembert is an administrative division of the Morbihan department, northwestern France. Its borders were modified at the French canton reorganisation which came into effect in March 2015. Its seat is in Questembert.

It consists of the following communes:

1. Berric
2. Caden
3. Le Cours
4. Elven
5. Larré
6. Lauzach
7. Limerzel
8. Malansac
9. Molac
10. Pluherlin
11. Questembert
12. Rochefort-en-Terre
13. Saint-Gravé
14. Sulniac
15. Trédion
16. La Vraie-Croix
