= Pluherlin =

Pluherlin Pluhernin
- Commune
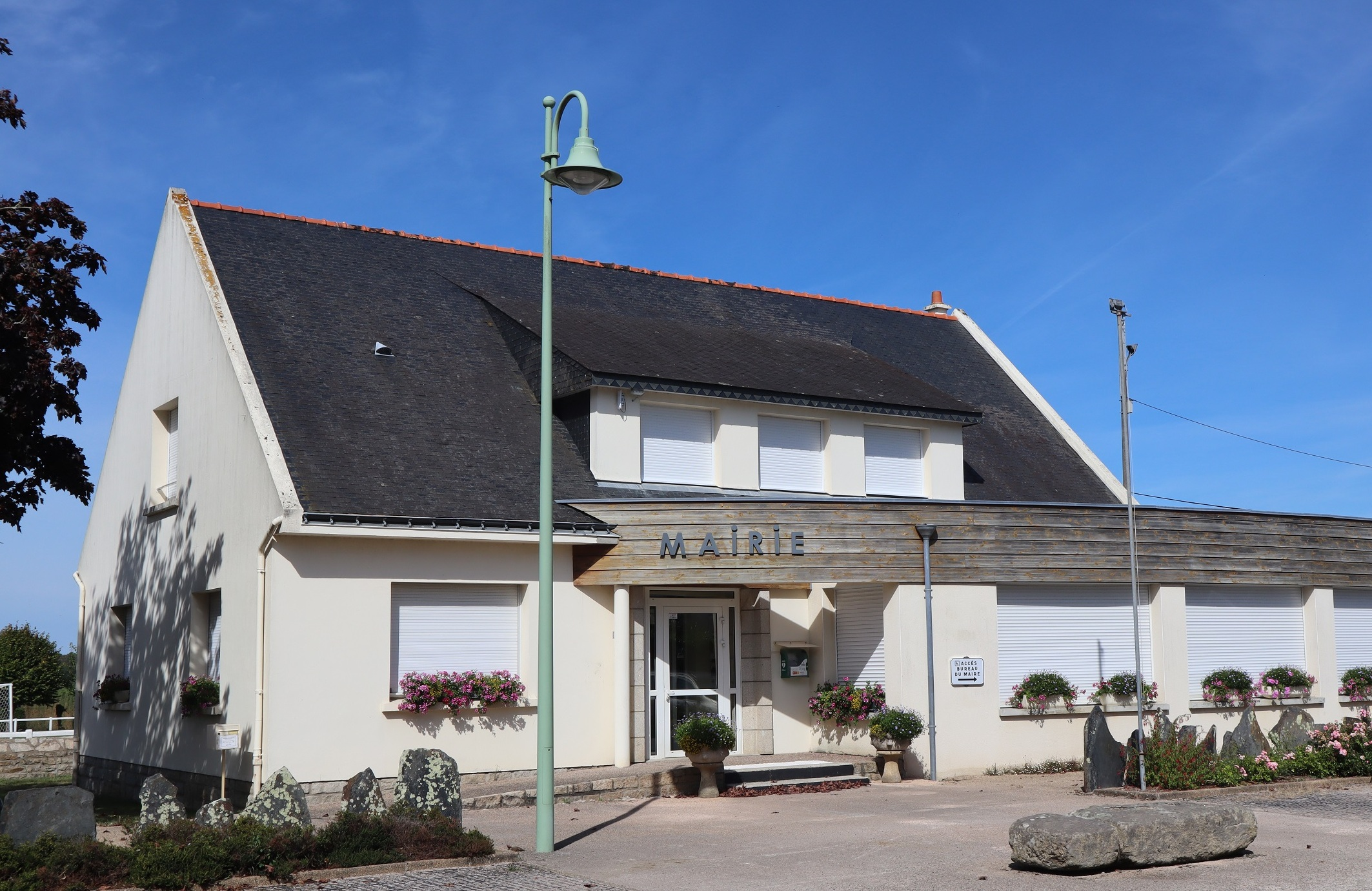
- Town hall

- Coat of arms
- Location of Pluherlin
- Location within France Location within Brittany
- Coordinates: 47°41′49″N 2°21′49″W
- Country: France
- Region: Brittany
- Department: Morbihan
- Arrondissement: Vannes
- Canton: Questembert
- Intercommunality: Questembert Communauté

Government
  - Mayor (2026–32): Jean-Pierre Galudec
- Area^{1}: 35.40 km^{2} (13.67 sq mi)
- Highest elevation: 101 m (331 ft)
- Lowest elevation: 13 m (43 ft)
- Population (2023): 1,542
  - Density: 43.56/km^{2} (112.8/sq mi)
- Time zone: UTC+01:00 (CET)
  - Summer (DST): UTC+02:00 (CEST)
- INSEE/Postal code: 56171 /56220
- ^{1} French Land Register data, which excludes lakes, ponds, glaciers > 1 km^{2} (0.386 sq mi or 247 acres) and river estuaries.

Pluherlin (French pronunciation: [plyɛʁlɛ̃]; Breton: Pluhernin) is a commune in the Morbihan department of Brittany in north-western France.

== Map ==
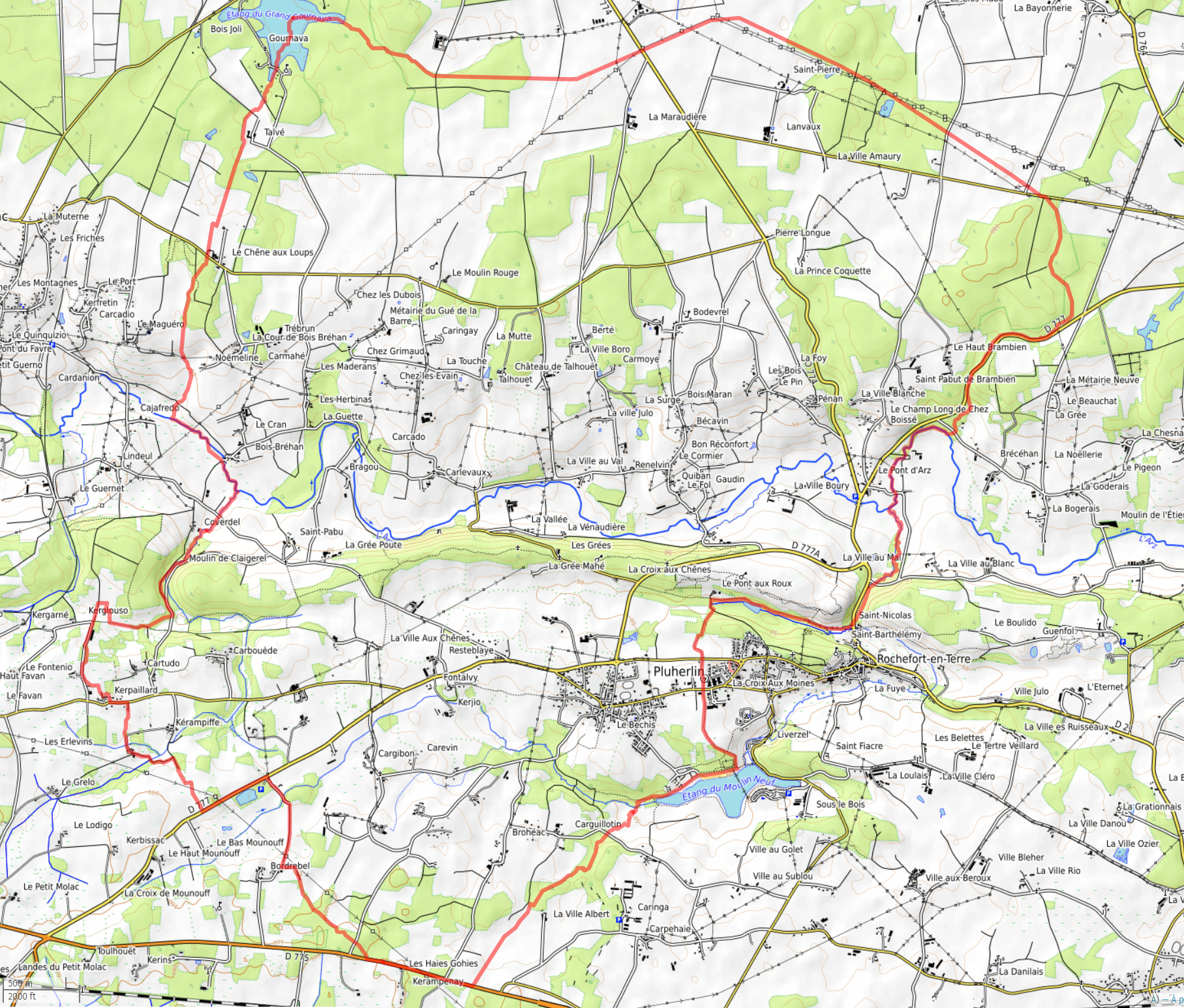
Topographic map.

== Demographics ==
Inhabitants of Pluherlin are called in French Pluherlinois.

== See also ==
- Communes of the Morbihan department
