= Sulniac =

Sulniac Sulnieg
- Commune
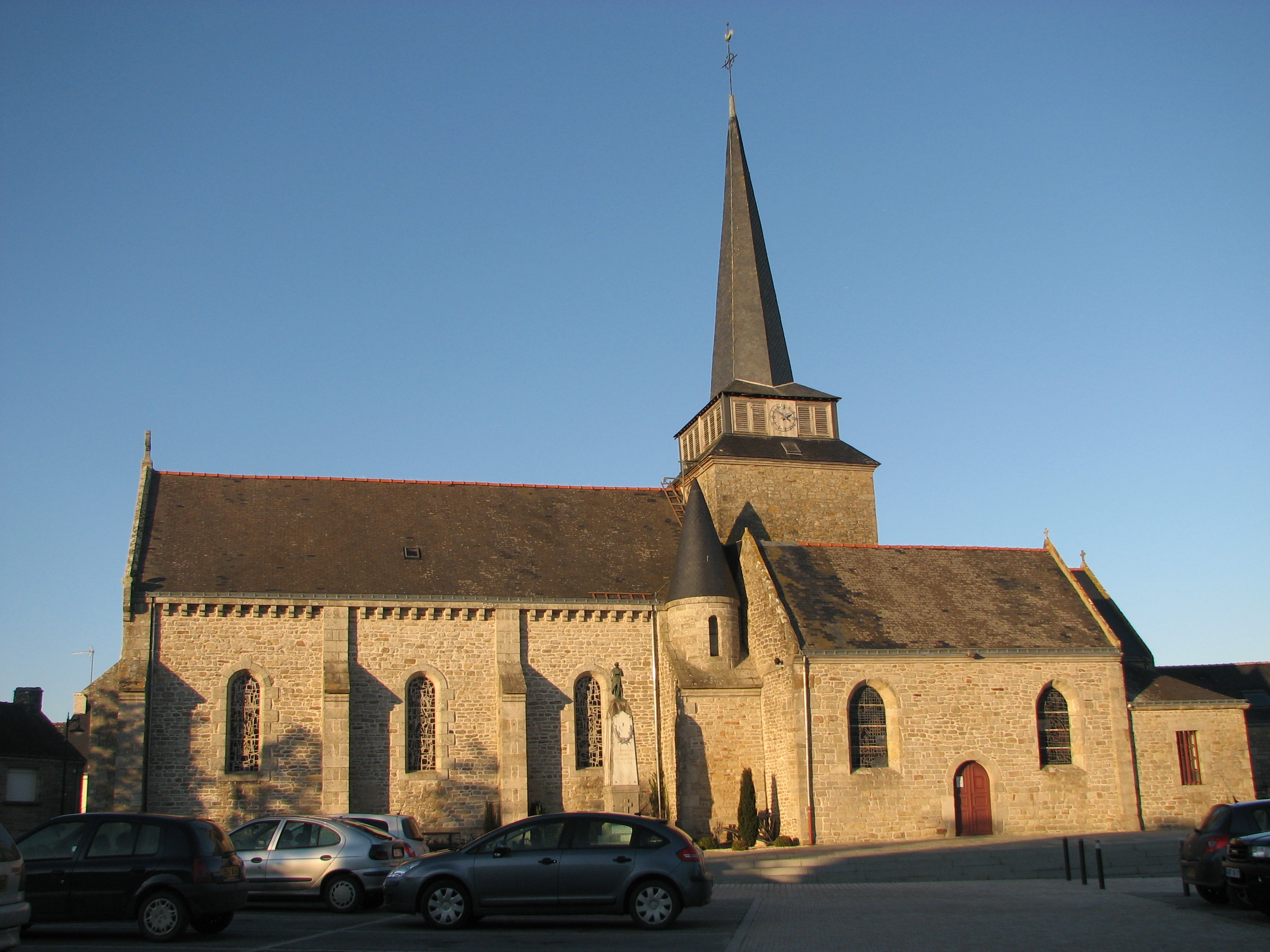
- The church in Sulniac

- Coat of arms
- Location of Sulniac
- Location within France Location within Brittany
- Coordinates: 47°40′35″N 2°34′14″W
- Country: France
- Region: Brittany
- Department: Morbihan
- Arrondissement: Vannes
- Canton: Questembert
- Intercommunality: Golfe du Morbihan - Vannes Agglomération

Government
  - Mayor (2026–32): Ludovic Samson
- Area^{1}: 27.92 km^{2} (10.78 sq mi)
- Highest elevation: 146 m (479 ft)
- Lowest elevation: 16 m (52 ft)
- Population (2023): 3,852
  - Density: 138.0/km^{2} (357.3/sq mi)
- Time zone: UTC+01:00 (CET)
  - Summer (DST): UTC+02:00 (CEST)
- INSEE/Postal code: 56247 /56250
- ^{1} French Land Register data, which excludes lakes, ponds, glaciers > 1 km^{2} (0.386 sq mi or 247 acres) and river estuaries.

Sulniac (French pronunciation: [sylnjak]; Breton: Sulnieg) is a commune in the Morbihan department of Brittany in north-western France.

== Population ==
Historical population
| Year | Pop. | ±% p.a. |
|---|---|---|
| 1968 | 1,144 | — |
| 1975 | 1,404 | +2.97% |
| 1982 | 1,640 | +2.24% |
| 1990 | 2,019 | +2.63% |
| 1999 | 2,209 | +1.00% |
| 2007 | 2,993 | +3.87% |
| 2012 | 3,298 | +1.96% |
| 2017 | 3,674 | +2.18% |
| 2023 | 3,852 | +0.79% |
Source: INSEE

Inhabitants of Sulniac are called in French Sulniacois.

== See also ==
- Communes of the Morbihan department
