= La Vraie-Croix =

La Vraie-Croix Langroez
- Commune
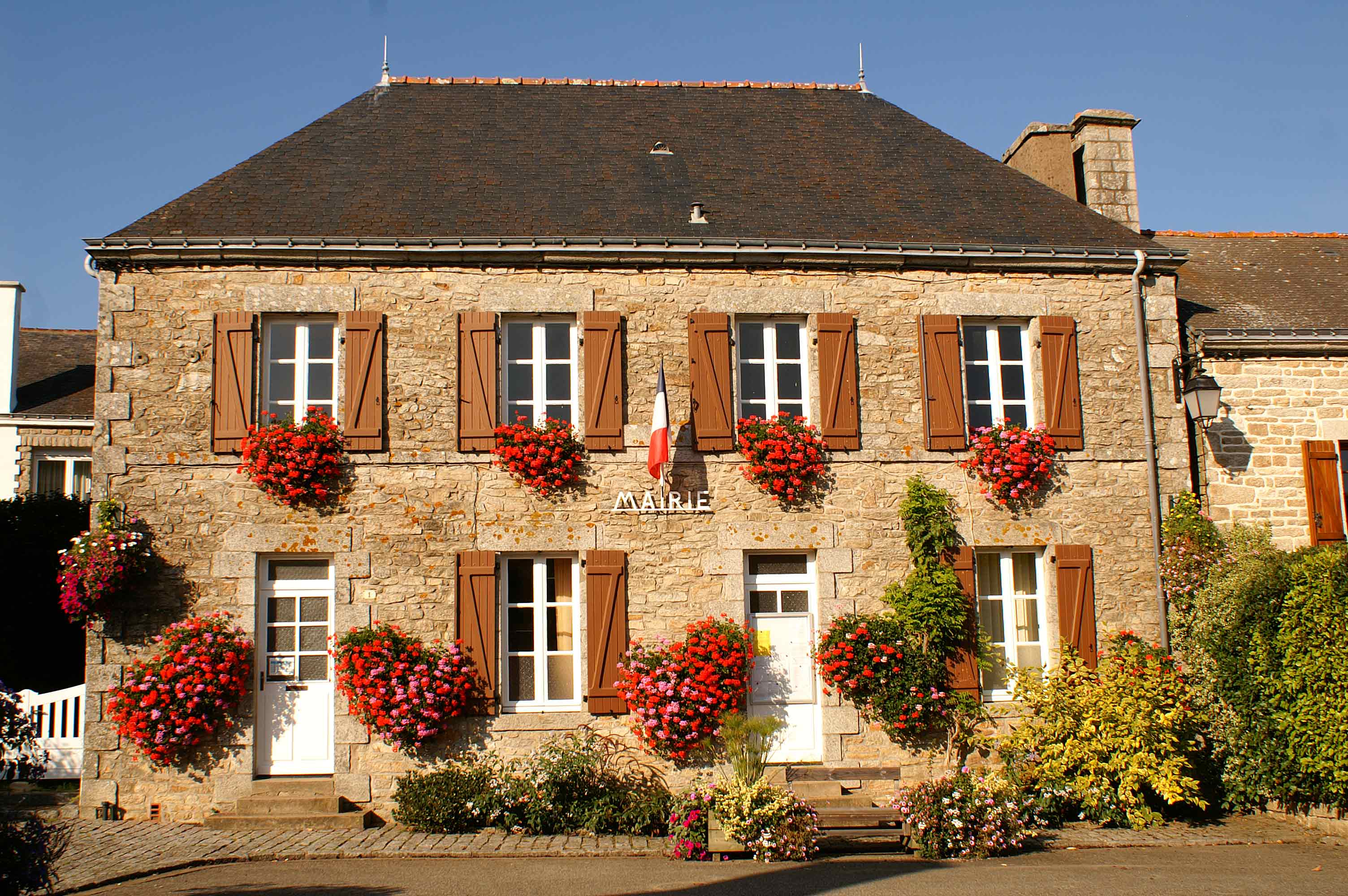
- The town hall in La-Vraie-Croix

- Coat of arms
- Location of La Vraie-Croix
- Location within France Location within Brittany
- Coordinates: 47°41′26″N 2°32′30″W
- Country: France
- Region: Brittany
- Department: Morbihan
- Arrondissement: Vannes
- Canton: Questembert
- Intercommunality: Questembert Communauté

Government
  - Mayor (2026–32): Pascal Guiblin
- Area^{1}: 16.63 km^{2} (6.42 sq mi)
- Highest elevation: 151 m (495 ft)
- Lowest elevation: 60 m (200 ft)
- Population (2023): 1,495
  - Density: 89.90/km^{2} (232.8/sq mi)
- Time zone: UTC+01:00 (CET)
  - Summer (DST): UTC+02:00 (CEST)
- INSEE/Postal code: 56261 /56250
- ^{1} French Land Register data, which excludes lakes, ponds, glaciers > 1 km^{2} (0.386 sq mi or 247 acres) and river estuaries.

La Vraie-Croix (French pronunciation: [la vʁɛ kʁwa]; Breton: Langroez) is a commune in the Morbihan department in Brittany in north-western France. Its inhabitants are called Langroëziens after the Breton name for the commune.

== History ==
The name La Vraie-Croix (English: The True Cross) comes from a knight of the Hospitaller Order of St. John of Jerusalem who, returning from a crusade, carried with a fragment of the True Cross. He stopped in the town during this journey. He returned the next day and saw that the fragment had disappeared. The piece was subsequently found in a crow's nest on top of a hawthorn bush.

The townspeople removed it, but the next day the fragment was back in the crow's nest. They saw it was a sign, and the people decided to build a chapel at the site of the tree to house the relic.

== Demographics ==
Historical population
Year	Pop.	±% p.a.
1968	666	—
1975	723	+1.18%
1982	835	+2.08%
1990	1,068	+3.12%
1999	1,068	+0.00%
2007	1,290	+2.39%
2012	1,382	+1.39%
2017	1,471	+1.26%
2023	1,495	+0.27%
Source: INSEE

== Green spaces ==
La Vraie-Croix is renowned for its floral decoration which is organised by the people of the village and which has won numerous awards. Indeed, this county has received a national award several times, as well as a European first prize. For many years the village has achieved a rating of four flowers (the maximum possible) and the grand prize in the Concours des villes et villages fleuris (Cities and villages in bloom competition).

== See also ==
- Communes of the Morbihan department
