= Trédion =

Trédion Tredion
- Commune
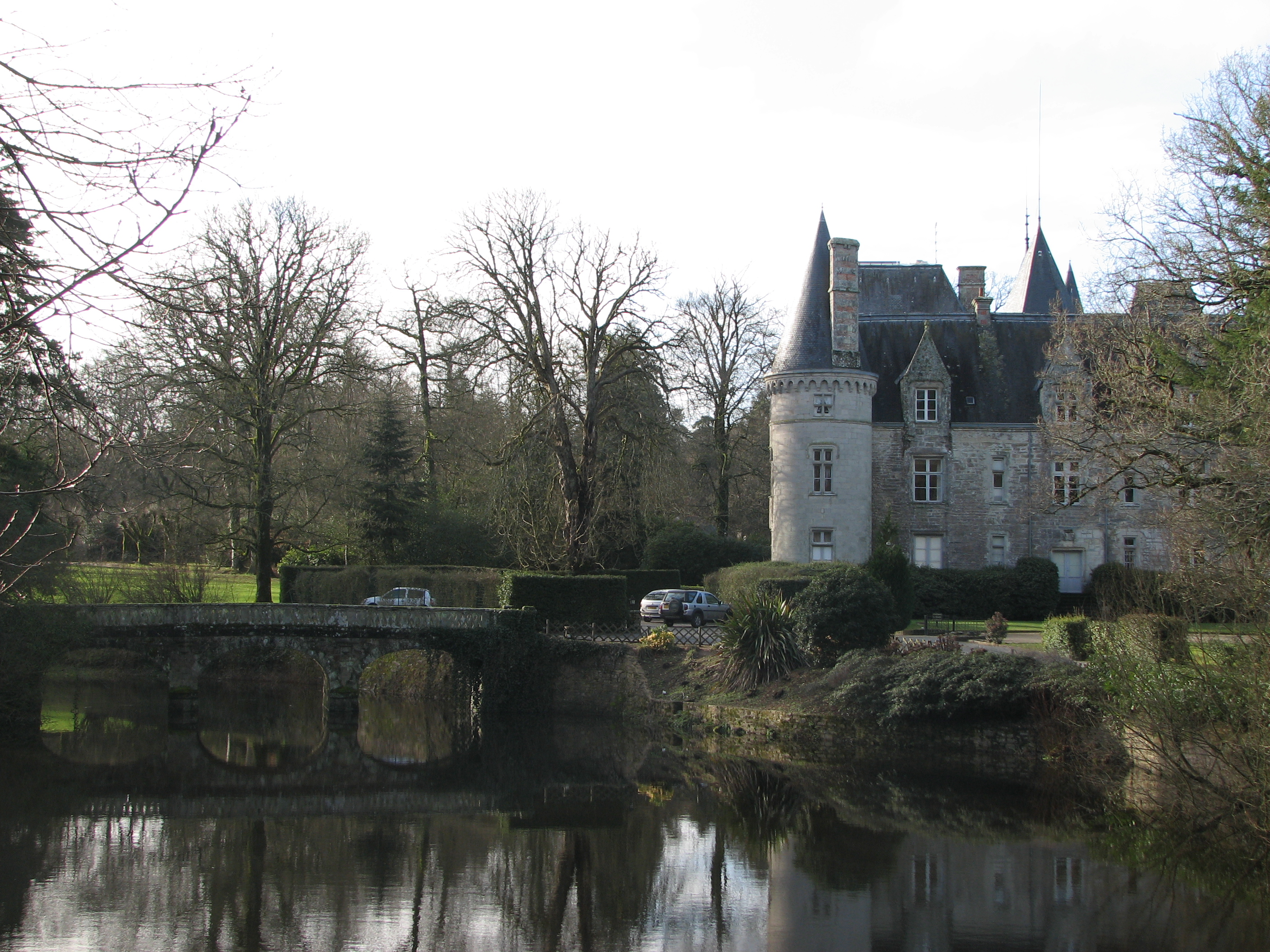
- The Château of Trédion

- Coat of arms
- Location of Trédion
- Location within France Location within Brittany
- Coordinates: 47°47′36″N 2°35′32″W
- Country: France
- Region: Brittany
- Department: Morbihan
- Arrondissement: Vannes
- Canton: Questembert
- Intercommunality: Golfe du Morbihan - Vannes Agglomération

Government
  - Mayor (2026–32): Jean-Michel Choquet
- Area^{1}: 25.76 km^{2} (9.95 sq mi)
- Highest elevation: 121 m (397 ft)
- Lowest elevation: 24 m (79 ft)
- Population (2023): 1,400
  - Density: 54/km^{2} (140/sq mi)
- Time zone: UTC+01:00 (CET)
  - Summer (DST): UTC+02:00 (CEST)
- INSEE/Postal code: 56254 /56250
- ^{1} French Land Register data, which excludes lakes, ponds, glaciers > 1 km^{2} (0.386 sq mi or 247 acres) and river estuaries.

Trédion (French pronunciation: [tʁedjɔ̃]; Breton: Tredion) is a commune in the Morbihan department of Brittany in north-western France. The population in 2019 was 1,308. Inhabitants of Trédion are called in French Trédionais.

== See also ==
- Communes of the Morbihan department
- Tredion Castle
