= Oust =

River in France

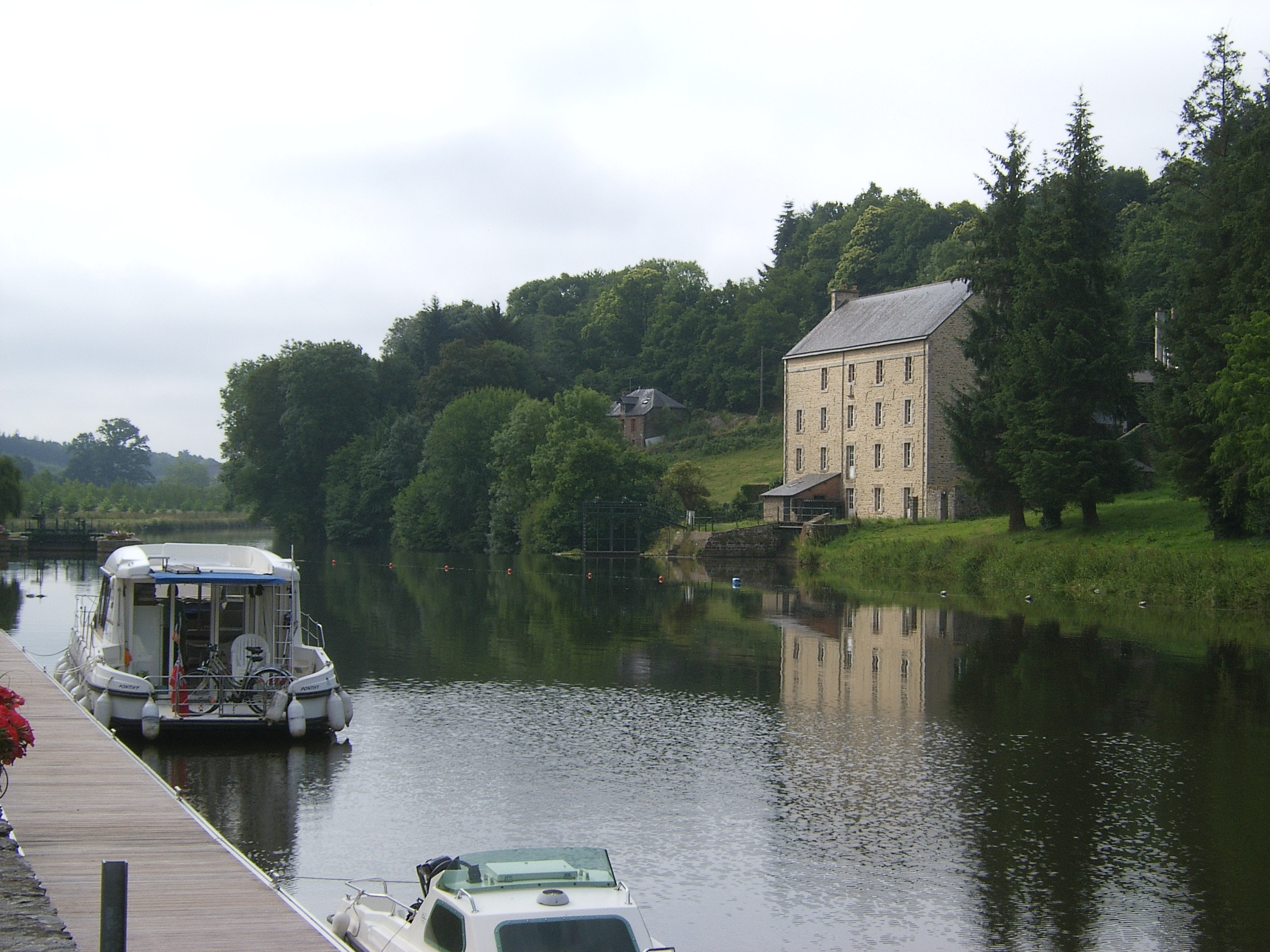
- Oust river in Josselin

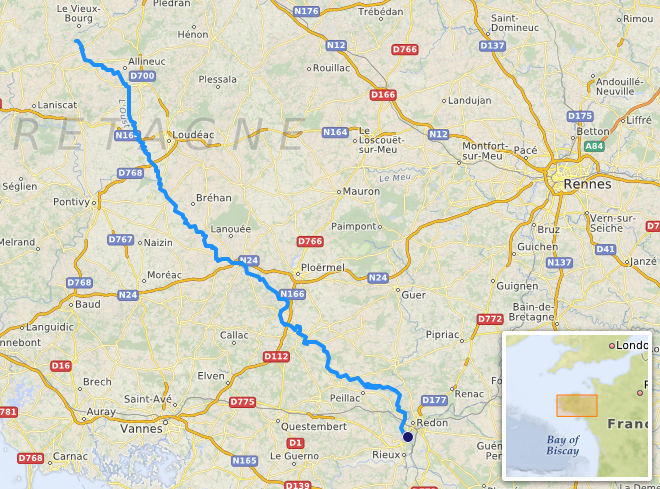

Location
- Country: France

Physical characteristics
- Source
  - location: Brittany
- Mouth
  - location: Vilaine
  - coordinates: 47°37′50″N 2°5′49″W
- Length: 145 km (90 mi)
- Basin size: 3,630 km^{2} (1,400 sq mi)
- Discharge
  - average: 25 m^{3}/s (880 cu ft/s)

Basin features
- Progression: Vilaine→ Atlantic Ocean

The Oust (French pronunciation: [ust]; Breton: Oud) is a river in Brittany, France, right tributary of the Vilaine. It is 145 km (90 mi) long. Its source is in the hills between Corlay and Quintin. It flows generally southeast, through the following départements and towns:

- Côtes-d'Armor: Uzel
- Morbihan: Rohan, Josselin, Malestroit
- Ille-et-Vilaine: Redon

The Oust flows into the river Vilaine in Redon. The part of the Oust between Rohan and Redon has been made navigable for small ships, and forms part of the Canal de Nantes à Brest.

The rivers Aff, Arz and Ninian are among its tributaries.
