= Quelneuc =

Quelneuc Kelenneg
- Part of Carentoir
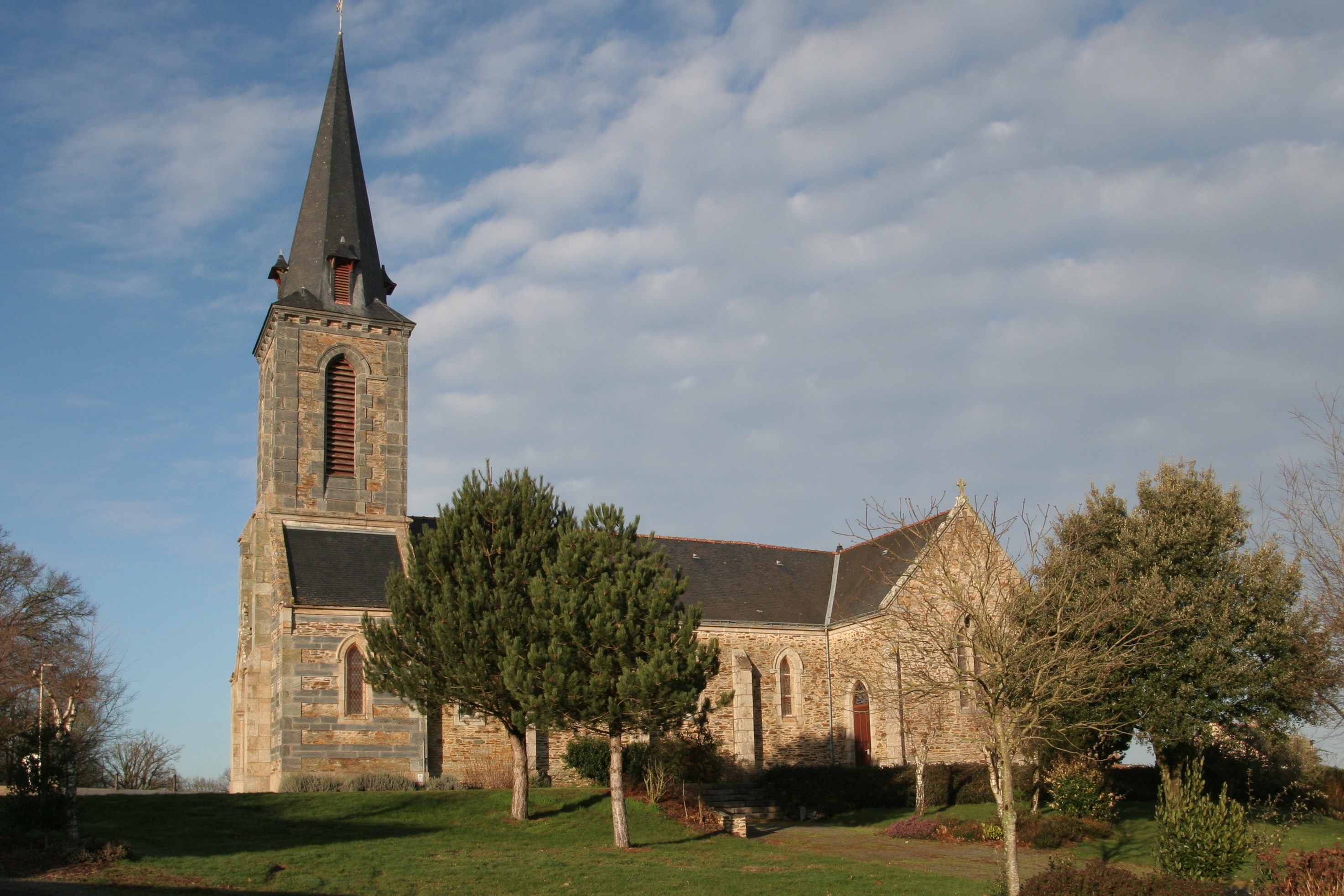
- The church of Saint-François-de-Sales, in Quelneuc
- Location of Quelneuc
- Location within France Location within Brittany
- Coordinates: 47°49′27″N 2°03′55″W
- Country: France
- Region: Brittany
- Department: Morbihan
- Arrondissement: Vannes
- Canton: Guer
- Commune: Carentoir
- Area^{1}: 13.85 km^{2} (5.35 sq mi)
- Highest elevation: 95 m (312 ft)
- Lowest elevation: 7 m (23 ft)
- Population (2022): 587
  - Density: 42.4/km^{2} (110/sq mi)
- Time zone: UTC+01:00 (CET)
  - Summer (DST): UTC+02:00 (CEST)
- Postal code: 56910
- ^{1} French Land Register data, which excludes lakes, ponds, glaciers > 1 km^{2} (0.386 sq mi or 247 acres) and river estuaries.

Quelneuc (Breton: Kelenneg) is a former commune in the Morbihan department of Brittany in north-western France. On 1 January 2017, it was merged into the commune Carentoir.

== Demographics ==
Inhabitants of Quelneuc are called in French Quelneucois.

== See also ==
- Communes of the Morbihan department
