= Réminiac =

Réminiac Ruvenieg
- Commune
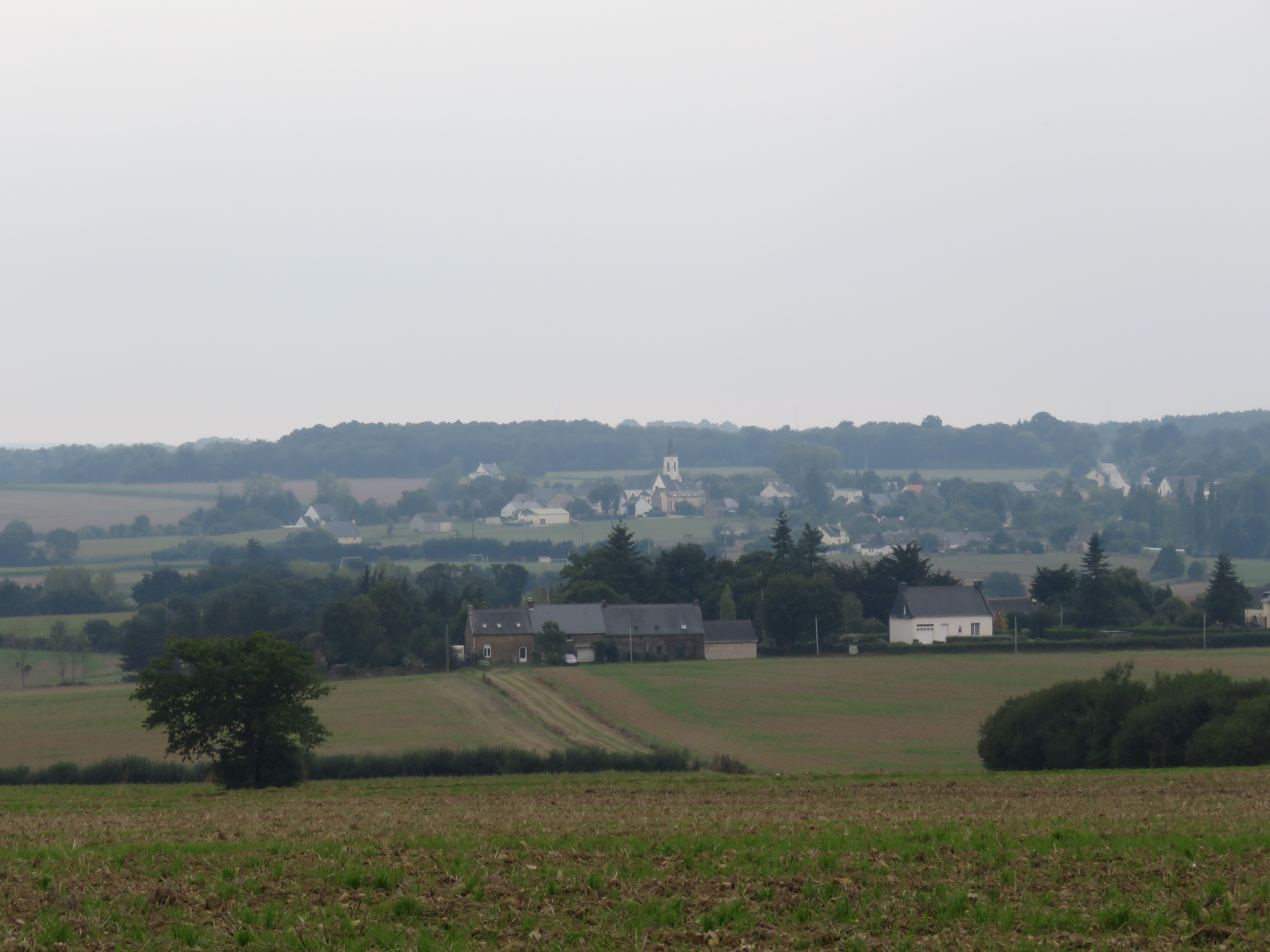
- View of Réminiac from Monteneuf to Augan.
- Location of Réminiac
- Location within France Location within Brittany
- Coordinates: 47°51′43″N 2°14′04″W
- Country: France
- Region: Brittany
- Department: Morbihan
- Arrondissement: Vannes
- Canton: Guer
- Intercommunality: CC de l'Oust à Brocéliande

Government
  - Mayor (2026–32): Patrice Bellec
- Area^{1}: 12.15 km^{2} (4.69 sq mi)
- Highest elevation: 124 m (407 ft)
- Lowest elevation: 45 m (148 ft)
- Population (2023): 438
  - Density: 36.0/km^{2} (93.4/sq mi)
- Time zone: UTC+01:00 (CET)
  - Summer (DST): UTC+02:00 (CEST)
- INSEE/Postal code: 56191 /56140
- ^{1} French Land Register data, which excludes lakes, ponds, glaciers > 1 km^{2} (0.386 sq mi or 247 acres) and river estuaries.

Réminiac (French pronunciation: [ʁeminjak]; Breton: Ruvenieg) is a commune in the Morbihan department of Brittany in north-western France. Inhabitants of Réminiac are called in French Réminiacois.

== See also ==
- Communes of the Morbihan department
