= 2021 Grand Prix du Morbihan =

2021 UCI Europe Tour 2021 UCI ProSeries

Race details
- Dates: 16 October 2021
- Stages: 1
- Distance: 176.9 km (109.9 mi)
- Winning time: 3h 51' 40"

Results
	Winner	Arne Marit (BEL)	(Sport Vlaanderen–Baloise)
	Second	Bryan Coquard (FRA)	(B&B Hotels p/b KTM)
	Third	Elia Viviani (ITA)	(Cofidis)

The 2021 Grand Prix du Morbihan was the 44th edition of the Grand Prix du Morbihan, a one-day road cycling race held on 16 October 2021 in and around Grand-Champ, Morbihan, in the Brittany region of northwestern France. This edition was the race's first in the UCI ProSeries; the 2020 edition was expected to feature in the inaugural UCI ProSeries but was cancelled due to the COVID-19 pandemic. It was also the fifteenth and penultimate event of the 2021 French Road Cycling Cup. The race was originally due to be held on 15 May but was postponed by COVID-19 precautions.

The 176.9-kilometre (109.9 mi) race began in Grand-Champ and headed southeast through the Regional Natural Park of the Gulf of Morbihan, passing through the towns of Saint-Avé, Treffléan, and Theix-Noyalo en route to the southernmost point of the race near Surzur. Then, the race headed north through Sulniac to Trédion, with sprint points in both towns, before heading west back to Grand-Champ for six laps of the hilly finishing circuit, which was 14.6 kilometres (9.1 mi) long; the first of these circuits began with 87.6 kilometres (54.4 mi) left in the race.

== Teams ==
Three of the 19 UCI WorldTeams, seven UCI ProTeams, five UCI Continental teams, and the French national team made up the 16 teams that participated in the race. UCI ProTeam Delko was also expected to participate, but the team ceased operations with immediate effect on 11 October due to financial problems. There were seven teams that did not field a full squad of seven riders; Burgos BH, Cofidis, EvoPro Racing, St. Michel–Auber93, and Xelliss–Roubaix–Lille Métropole each entered six riders, while Bike Aid and Rally Cycling each entered five riders. In total, 103 riders started the race, of which 85 finished.

UCI WorldTeams

- AG2R Citroën Team
- Cofidis
- Groupama–FDJ

UCI ProTeams

- Arkéa–Samsic
- B&B Hotels p/b KTM
- Burgos BH
- Rally Cycling
- Sport Vlaanderen–Baloise
- Team TotalEnergies
- Uno-X Pro Cycling Team

UCI Continental Teams

- Bike Aid
- EvoPro Racing
- St. Michel–Auber93
- Tarteletto–Isorex
- Xelliss–Roubaix–Lille Métropole

National Teams

- France

== Result ==
Result
Rank	Rider	Team	Time
1	Arne Marit (BEL)	Sport Vlaanderen–Baloise	3h 51' 40"
2	Bryan Coquard (FRA)	B&B Hotels p/b KTM	+ 0"
3	Elia Viviani (ITA)	Cofidis	+ 0"
4	Jason Tesson (FRA)	St. Michel–Auber93	+ 0"
5	Dorian Godon (FRA)	AG2R Citroën Team	+ 0"
6	Manuel Peñalver (ESP)	Burgos BH	+ 0"
7	Théo Cotard (FRA)	France	+ 0"
8	Romain Cardis (FRA)	St. Michel–Auber93	+ 0"
9	Andreas Goeman (BEL)	Tarteletto–Isorex	+ 0"
10	Lilian Calmejane (FRA)	AG2R Citroën Team	+ 0"
