= Allaire =

Allaire may refer to:

== Organizations ==
- Allaire Corporation, a web development company acquired by Macromedia in 2001
- Allaire Iron Works, a 19th-century marine engineering company in New York City
- Allaire Studios, a former recording studio in Glen Tonche, New York

== Places ==
- Allaire, Morbihan, a commune of the Morbihan département, in France
- Allaire, New Jersey, an unincorporated community
  - Allaire State Park, a state park in the above community
  - Allaire Village, a living history museum in Allaire State Park
- Allaire Airport or Monmouth Jet Center, New Jersey
- Allaire Peak, in the Prince Olav Mountains, Antarctica

== Other uses ==
- Allaire (surname), a French surname
- Allaire du Pont (1913–2006), an American sportswoman and racehorse owner
- Allaire Report, 1991, recommending a transfer of powers to Quebec
