= Saint-Malo-de-Beignon =

Saint-Malo-de-Beignon Sant-Maloù-Benion
- Commune
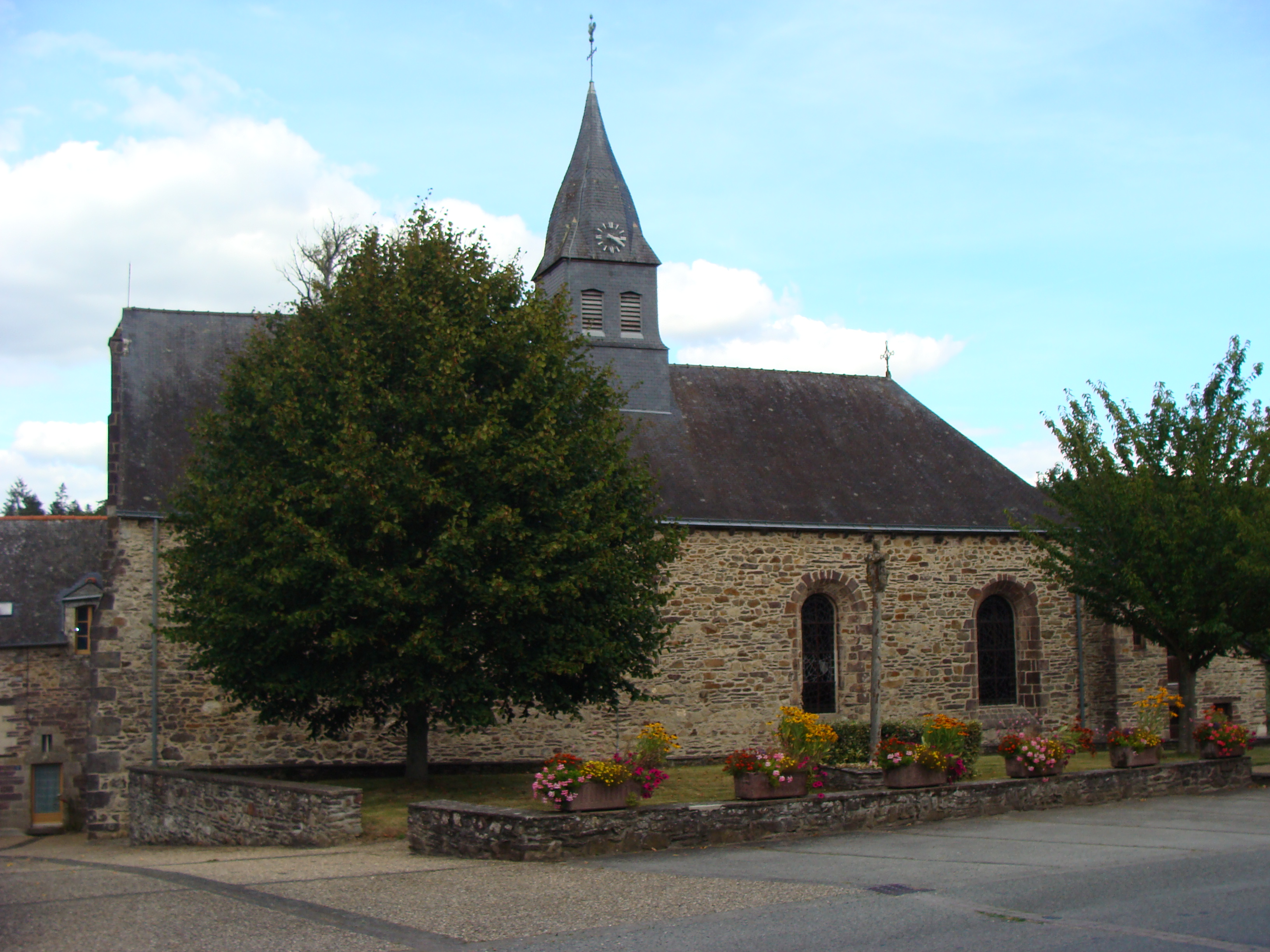
- The Church of Saint-Malo, in Saint-Malo-de-Beignon

- Coat of arms
- Location of Saint-Malo-de-Beignon
- Location within France Location within Brittany
- Coordinates: 47°57′34″N 2°08′54″W
- Country: France
- Region: Brittany
- Department: Morbihan
- Arrondissement: Vannes
- Canton: Guer
- Intercommunality: CC de l'Oust à Brocéliande

Government
  - Mayor (2026–32): Marie-Hélène Herry
- Area^{1}: 3.49 km^{2} (1.35 sq mi)
- Highest elevation: 153 m (502 ft)
- Lowest elevation: 50 m (160 ft)
- Population (2023): 537
  - Density: 154/km^{2} (399/sq mi)
- Time zone: UTC+01:00 (CET)
  - Summer (DST): UTC+02:00 (CEST)
- INSEE/Postal code: 56226 /56380
- ^{1} French Land Register data, which excludes lakes, ponds, glaciers > 1 km^{2} (0.386 sq mi or 247 acres) and river estuaries.

Saint-Malo-de-Beignon (French pronunciation: [sɛ̃ malo də bɛɲɔ̃], literally Saint-Malo of Beignon; Breton: Sant-Maloù-Benion) is a commune in the Morbihan department of Brittany in north-western France. Inhabitants of Saint-Malo-de-Beignon are called in French Maloins.

== See also ==
- Communes of the Morbihan department
