= Saint-Martin-sur-Oust =

Saint-Martin-sur-Oust Sant-Varzhin-an-Oud
- Commune
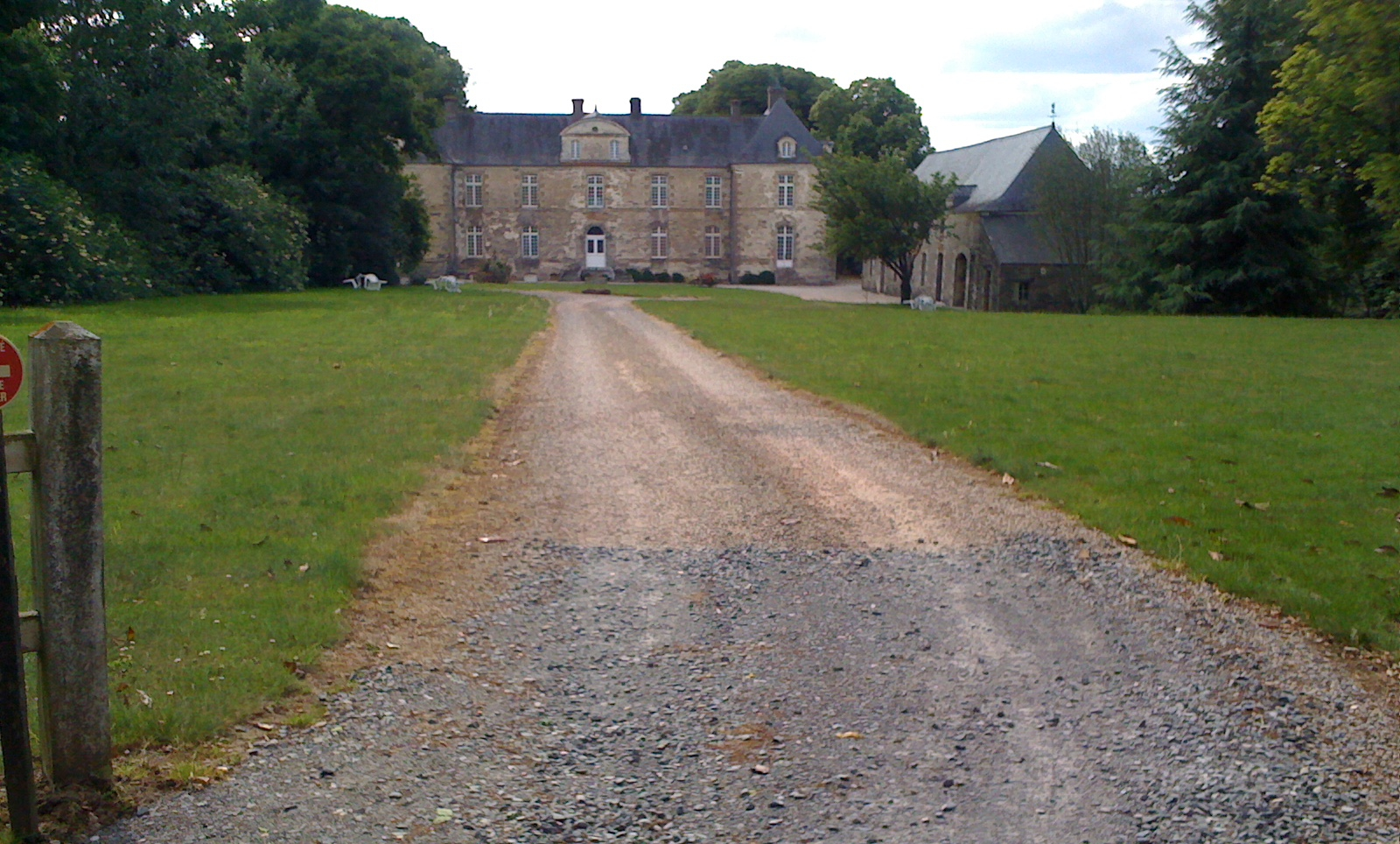
- The Château of Castellan

- Coat of arms
- Location of Saint-Martin-sur-Oust
- Location within France Location within Brittany
- Coordinates: 47°44′48″N 2°15′09″W
- Country: France
- Region: Brittany
- Department: Morbihan
- Arrondissement: Vannes
- Canton: Guer

Government
  - Mayor (2026–32): Marion Le Pogam
- Area^{1}: 28.24 km^{2} (10.90 sq mi)
- Highest elevation: 103 m (338 ft)
- Lowest elevation: 2 m (6.6 ft)
- Population (2023): 1,312
  - Density: 46.46/km^{2} (120.3/sq mi)
- Time zone: UTC+01:00 (CET)
  - Summer (DST): UTC+02:00 (CEST)
- INSEE/Postal code: 56229 /56200
- ^{1} French Land Register data, which excludes lakes, ponds, glaciers > 1 km^{2} (0.386 sq mi or 247 acres) and river estuaries.

Saint-Martin-sur-Oust (French pronunciation: [sɛ̃ maʁtɛ̃ syʁ ust], literally Saint-Martin on Oust; Breton: Sant-Varzhin-an-Oud) is a commune in the Morbihan department of Brittany in north-western France. Until 6 October 2008 it was known as Saint-Martin. Inhabitants of Saint-Martin-sur-Oust are called in French Martinais.

== See also ==
- Communes of the Morbihan department
