= Peillac =

Peillac Paolieg
- Commune
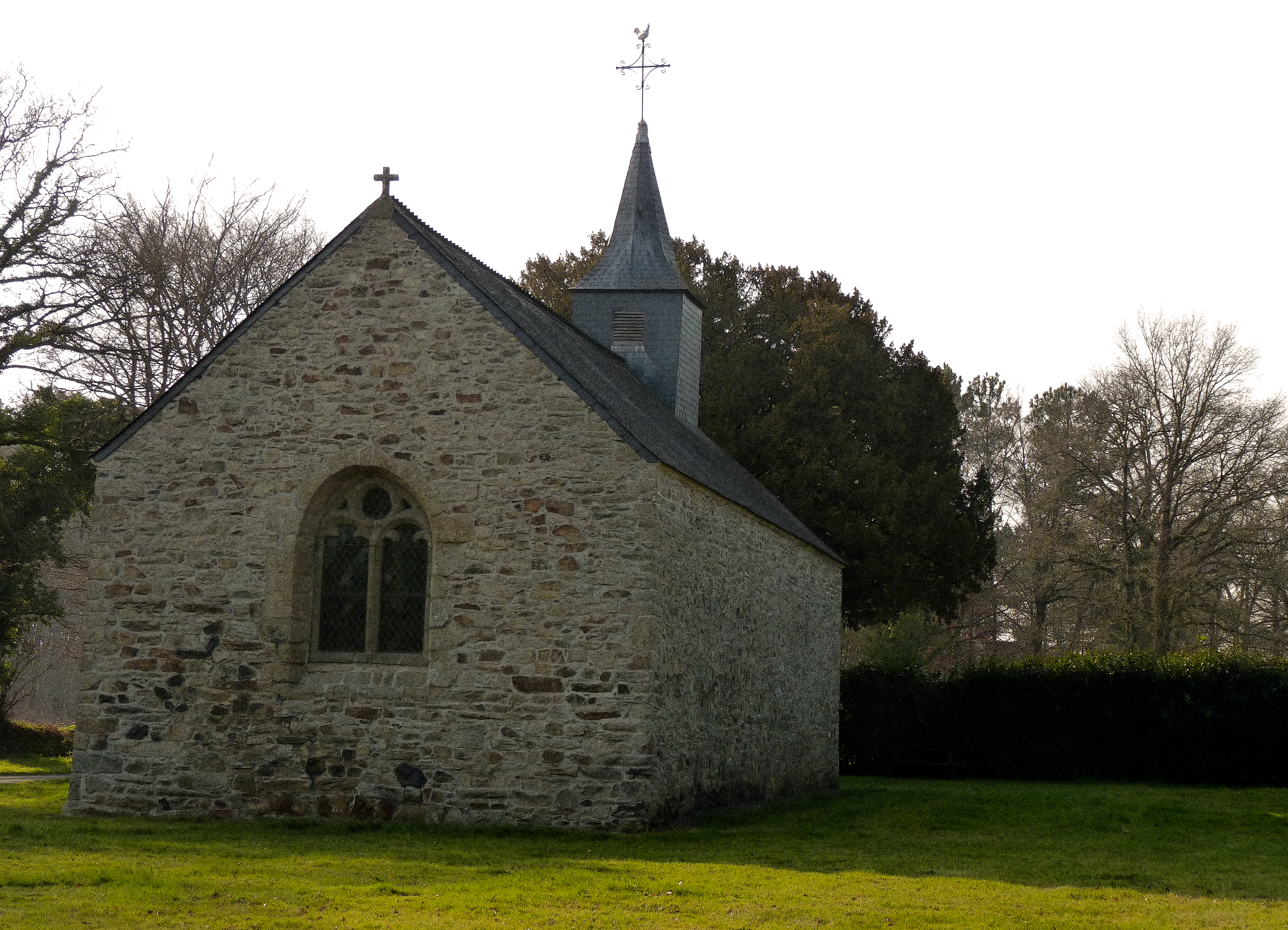
- The chapel of Saint-Julien

- Coat of arms
- Location of Peillac
- Location within France Location within Brittany
- Coordinates: 47°42′51″N 2°13′05″W
- Country: France
- Region: Brittany
- Department: Morbihan
- Arrondissement: Vannes
- Canton: Guer
- Intercommunality: Redon Agglomération

Government
  - Mayor (2026–32): Philippe Becuwe
- Area^{1}: 24.57 km^{2} (9.49 sq mi)
- Highest elevation: 82 m (269 ft)
- Lowest elevation: 0 m (0 ft)
- Population (2023): 1,873
  - Density: 76.23/km^{2} (197.4/sq mi)
- Time zone: UTC+01:00 (CET)
  - Summer (DST): UTC+02:00 (CEST)
- INSEE/Postal code: 56154 /56220
- ^{1} French Land Register data, which excludes lakes, ponds, glaciers > 1 km^{2} (0.386 sq mi or 247 acres) and river estuaries.

Peillac (French pronunciation: [pɛjak]; Breton: Paolieg; Gallo: Peilla) is a commune in the east of Morbihan department of Brittany in north-western France.

== Geography ==
The canal de Nantes à Brest forms all of the commune's northern border; the river Arz forms all of its southern border.

== Demographics ==
Inhabitants of Peillac are called in French Peillacois.

Historical population

Year	Pop.	±% p.a.
1793	1,764	—
1821	1,790	+0.05%
1846	2,006	+0.46%
1872	1,856	−0.30%
1901	2,044	+0.33%
1926	1,849	−0.40%
1946	1,754	−0.26%
1962	1,599	−0.58%
1968	1,536	−0.67%

Year	Pop.	±% p.a.
1975	1,620	+0.76%
1982	1,736	+0.99%
1990	1,694	−0.31%
1999	1,649	−0.30%
2007	1,812	+1.19%
2012	1,859	+0.51%
2017	1,858	−0.01%
2023	1,873	+0.13%

Source: EHESS and INSEE (1968-2023)

== Map ==
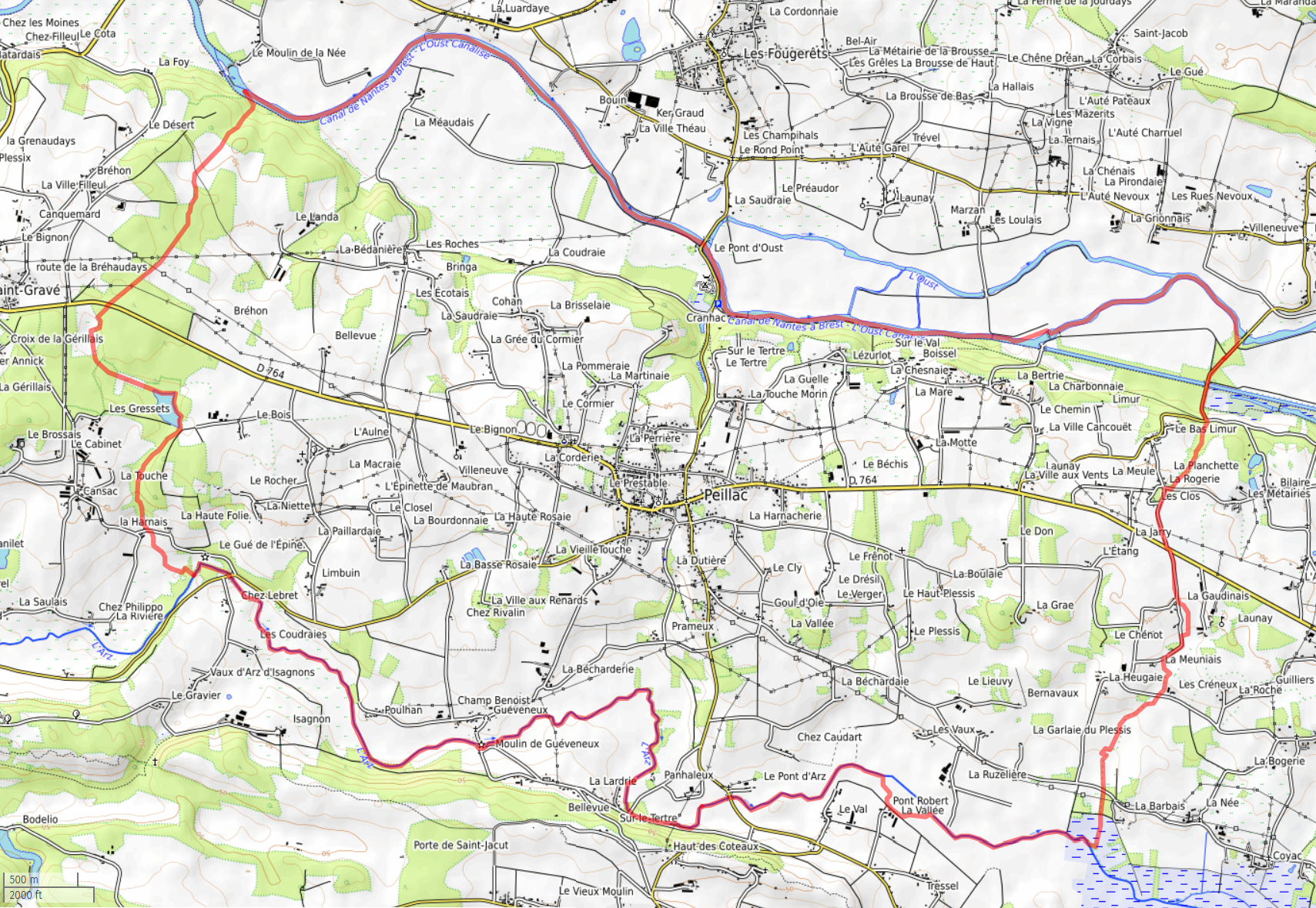
Topographic map

== See also ==
- Communes of the Morbihan department
