= Saint-Jacut-les-Pins =

Saint-Jacut-les-Pins Sant-Yagu-ar-Bineg
- Commune
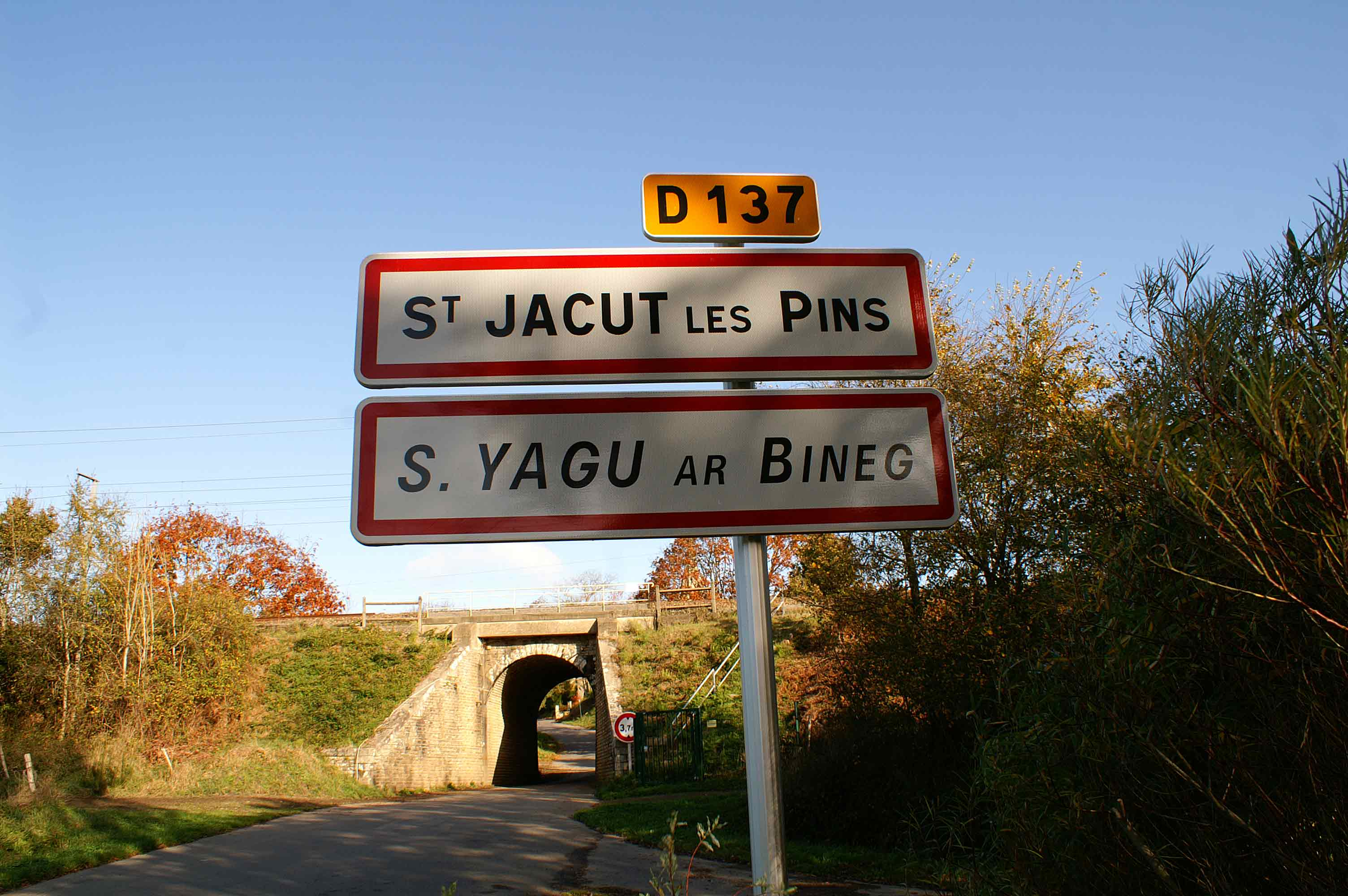
- The road into Saint-Jacut-les-Pins
- Location of Saint-Jacut-les-Pins
- Location within France Location within Brittany
- Coordinates: 47°41′10″N 2°12′51″W
- Country: France
- Region: Brittany
- Department: Morbihan
- Arrondissement: Vannes
- Canton: Guer
- Intercommunality: Redon Agglomération

Government
  - Mayor (2026–32): Sophie Bouchon
- Area^{1}: 22.81 km^{2} (8.81 sq mi)
- Highest elevation: 88 m (289 ft)
- Lowest elevation: 2 m (6.6 ft)
- Population (2023): 1,745
  - Density: 76.50/km^{2} (198.1/sq mi)
- Time zone: UTC+01:00 (CET)
  - Summer (DST): UTC+02:00 (CEST)
- INSEE/Postal code: 56221 /56220
- ^{1} French Land Register data, which excludes lakes, ponds, glaciers > 1 km^{2} (0.386 sq mi or 247 acres) and river estuaries.

Saint-Jacut-les-Pins (French pronunciation: [sɛ̃ ʒaky le pɛ̃]; Breton: Sant-Yagu-ar-Bineg) is a commune in the Morbihan department of Brittany in north-western France.

== Geography ==
The river Arz forms all of the commune's northern boundary.

== History ==
The Celtic Veneti, and then the Romans occupied the area in Classical times.

In the High Middle Ages, Britons founded several villages, Bodnaga, Brehadou Guidemais, Bina, Redillac, Brandicoet, and Calleon to name just a few of their towns in the area. The name Saint-Jacut-les-Pins comes from a 6th-century Saint Jacut, who arrived with the British emigrants as a boy and established a church nearby.

The parish suffered heavily in the French Revolution.

== Facilities ==
The municipality has a medical home, Doctors, a pharmacy and a retirement home which provides a course of activities health for seniors.

Educationally, the commune has a nursery and primary school (École Saint-Joseph), a medical Institute and a technology high school (ISSAT).

In sporting terms, the municipality has a Sports Hall, and the dynamism of its numerous sports associations (cycling, hiking, running foot, basketball, football, tennis, motorcycling, water gymnastics, hunting and fishing).

Finally, on the cultural level, the municipality has a media library (Médiathèque Saint-Jacut-les-Pins) and many associations (theatre, choral, foyer des jeunes).

== Transport ==
The commune is located 10 minutes by car from Redon station. Nantes Atlantique Airport and Rennes–Saint-Jacques Airport are respectively at 1 h 15 min and 1 h by car.

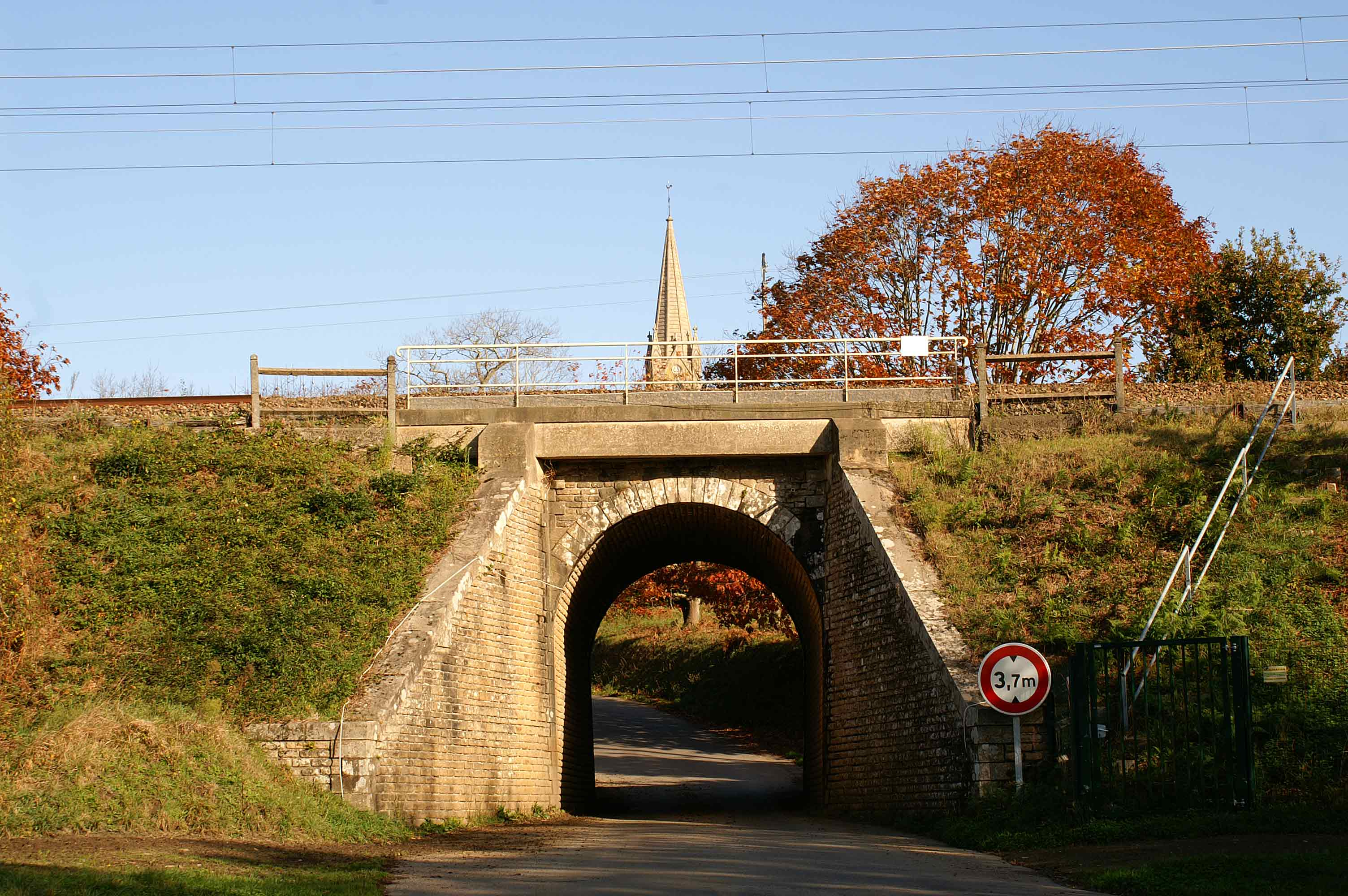
The railway bridge

The municipality is crossed from East to West by the main rail axis of the southern Brittany. This line Savenay - Landerneau opened up to Lorient in 1862, it allows by Redon relations between the stations of the Brittany cities of the South and Paris by Rennes. The municipality has long disposed of a station and then a train stop, currently these two stations are closed and abandoned. The railway history of the commune will may be rebound with freight activity.

== Demographics ==
Inhabitants of Saint-Jacut-les-Pins are called in French Jacutais.

Historical population

Year	Pop.	±% p.a.
1793	1,375	—
1821	1,414	+0.10%
1846	1,314	−0.29%
1872	1,477	+0.45%
1901	1,457	−0.05%
1926	1,428	−0.08%
1946	1,525	+0.33%
1962	1,455	−0.29%
1968	1,485	+0.34%

Year	Pop.	±% p.a.
1975	1,559	+0.70%
1982	1,590	+0.28%
1990	1,570	−0.16%
1999	1,552	−0.13%
2007	1,711	+1.23%
2012	1,729	+0.21%
2017	1,733	+0.05%
2023	1,745	+0.12%

Source: EHESS and INSEE (1968-2023)

== See also ==
- Communes of the Morbihan department
