= Rieux, Morbihan =

Rieux Reoz
- Commune
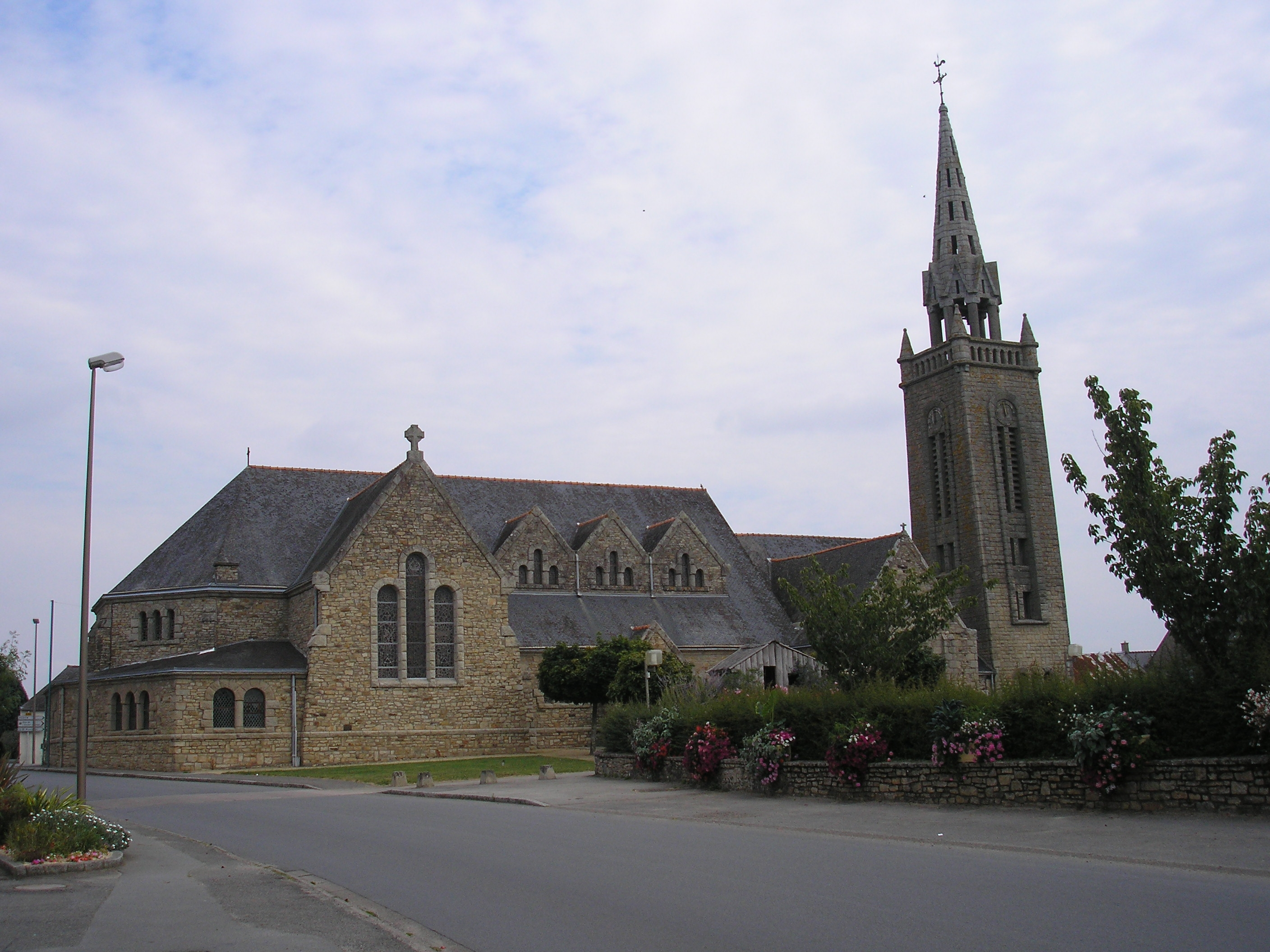
- Saint-Melaine Church, in Rieux

- Coat of arms
- Location of Rieux
- Location within France Location within Brittany
- Coordinates: 47°35′55″N 2°06′21″W
- Country: France
- Region: Brittany
- Department: Morbihan
- Arrondissement: Vannes
- Canton: Guer
- Intercommunality: Redon Agglomération

Government
  - Mayor (2026–32): Thierry Poulain
- Area^{1}: 27.78 km^{2} (10.73 sq mi)
- Highest elevation: 81 m (266 ft)
- Lowest elevation: 0 m (0 ft)
- Population (2023): 2,856
  - Density: 102.8/km^{2} (266.3/sq mi)
- Demonym(s): Rieuxois·e (French); Reoziad·ez (Breton)
- Time zone: UTC+01:00 (CET)
  - Summer (DST): UTC+02:00 (CEST)
- INSEE/Postal code: 56194 /56350
- ^{1} French Land Register data, which excludes lakes, ponds, glaciers > 1 km^{2} (0.386 sq mi or 247 acres) and river estuaries.

Rieux (French pronunciation: [ʁijø]; Breton: Reoz) is a commune in the Morbihan department, Brittany, northwestern France.

== Geography ==
Rieux is on the border with Ille-et-Vilaine and Loire Atlantique, near Redon and its railway station. The town is bordered by the rivers Oust and the Vilaine. Rieux is between Nantes, Rennes and Vannes and also most beautiful villages of Brittany as Rochefort-en-Terre, La Roche-Bernard, La Gacilly.

Before the building of the dam of Arzal, tides were to go here.

== Map ==
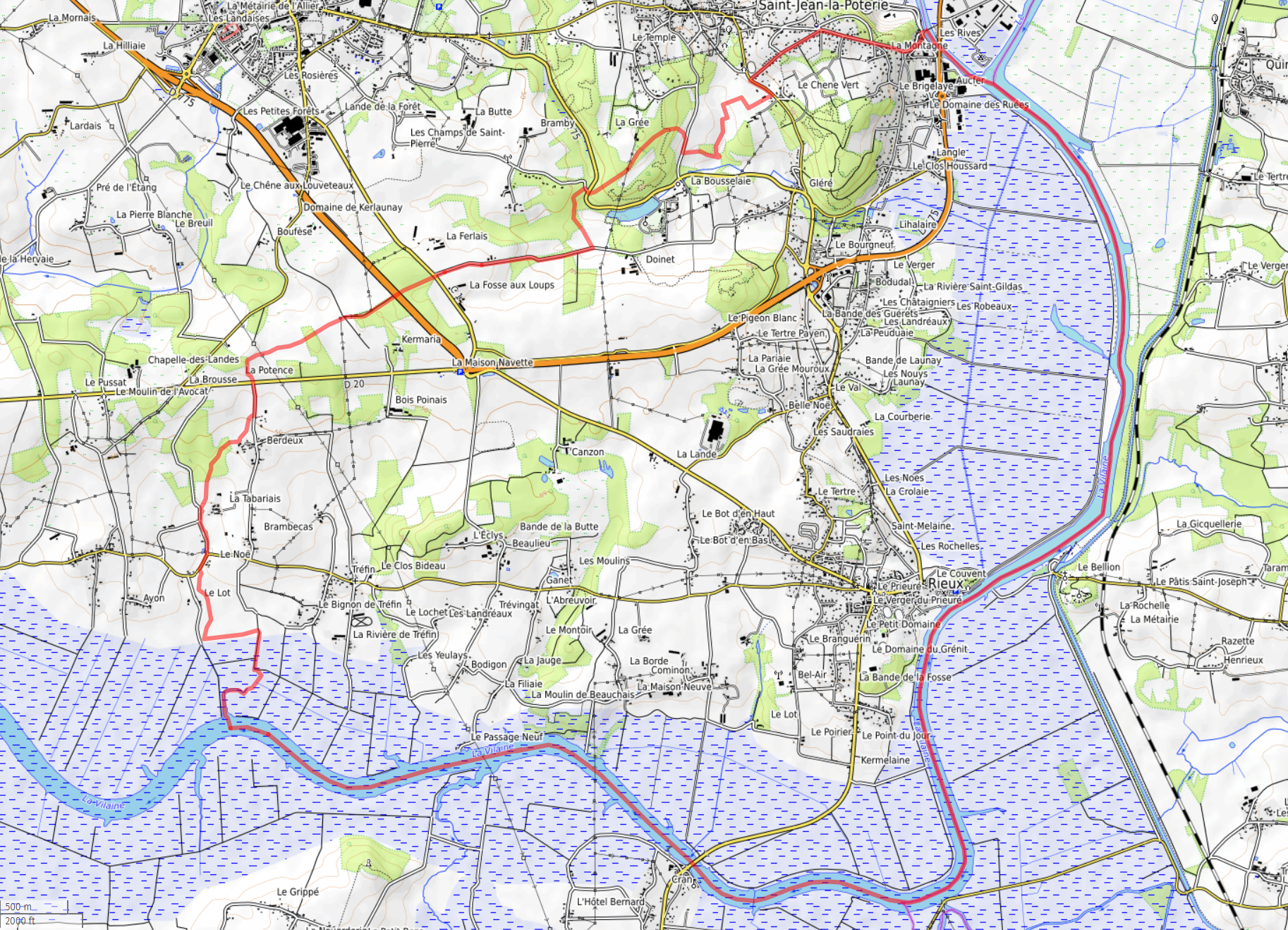
Topographic map

== History ==
In the 3rd century, Rieux was populated by Romans, the town had more than 10,000 inhabitants and was called Duretie.

In the Middle Ages, Rieux was affected by the foundation of Redon Abbey in 832.

During the Second World War, Rieux was occupied by German Army who destroyed the bell tower in 1944 causing a fire in the church, it was rebuilt in 1956. The town was liberated in August 1945.

== Population ==
Historical population
Year	Pop.	±% p.a.
1968	2,015	—
1975	2,263	+1.67%
1982	2,522	+1.56%
1990	2,717	+0.94%
1999	2,781	+0.26%
2007	2,801	+0.09%
2012	2,897	+0.68%
2017	2,845	−0.36%
2023	2,856	+0.06%
Source: INSEE

Inhabitants of Rieux are called in French Rieuxois and Rieuxoise in the feminine form.

== Places and monuments ==
- St Melaine Church
- Medieval castle ruins
- A campsite near the Vilaine River and a little marina.

== See also ==
- Communes of the Morbihan department
- Rio (disambiguation)
- Ríos (disambiguation)
