= Théhillac =

Théhillac Tehelieg
- Commune
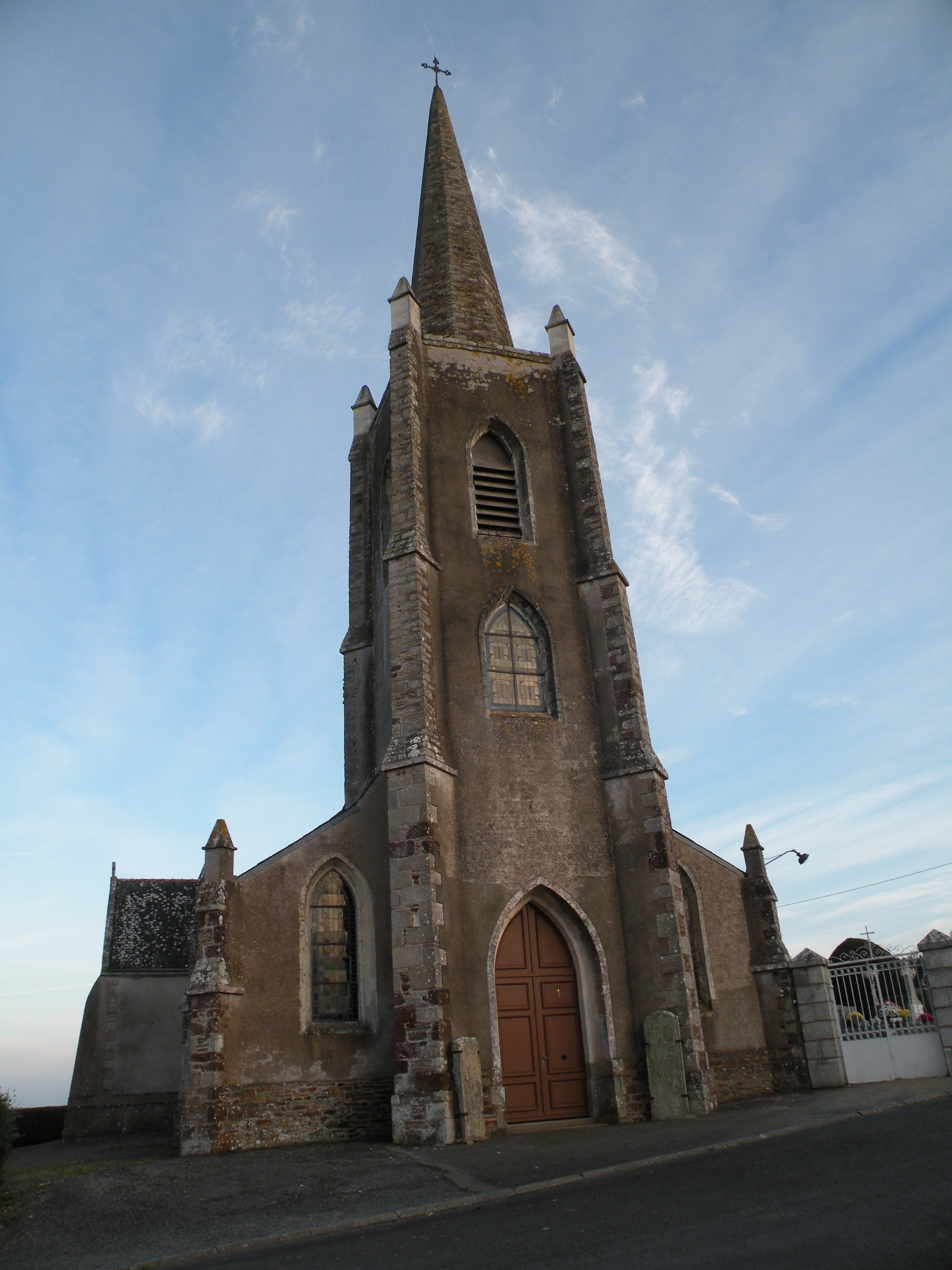
- The church in Théhillac

- Coat of arms
- Location of Théhillac
- Location within France Location within Brittany
- Coordinates: 47°34′07″N 2°06′55″W
- Country: France
- Region: Brittany
- Department: Morbihan
- Arrondissement: Vannes
- Canton: Guer
- Intercommunality: Redon Agglomération

Government
  - Mayor (2026–32): Gilles Haurogné
- Area^{1}: 14.46 km^{2} (5.58 sq mi)
- Highest elevation: 62 m (203 ft)
- Lowest elevation: 1 m (3.3 ft)
- Population (2023): 611
  - Density: 42.3/km^{2} (109/sq mi)
- Time zone: UTC+01:00 (CET)
  - Summer (DST): UTC+02:00 (CEST)
- INSEE/Postal code: 56250 /56130
- ^{1} French Land Register data, which excludes lakes, ponds, glaciers > 1 km^{2} (0.386 sq mi or 247 acres) and river estuaries.

Théhillac (French pronunciation: [te.ijak]; Breton: Tehelieg) is a commune in the Morbihan department of Brittany in north-western France.

== Demographics ==
Inhabitants of Théhillac are called in French Théhillacois.

Historical population
Year	Pop.	±% p.a.
1968	476	—
1975	484	+0.24%
1982	533	+1.39%
1990	510	−0.55%
1999	512	+0.04%
2007	524	+0.29%
2012	562	+1.41%
2017	596	+1.18%
2023	611	+0.42%
Source: INSEE

== See also ==
- Communes of the Morbihan department
