= Saint-Vincent-sur-Oust =

Saint-Vincent-sur-Oust Sant-Visant-an-Oud
- Commune
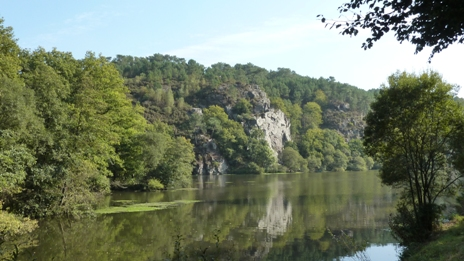
- The Île-aux-Pies in the middle of the Oust river

- Coat of arms
- Location of Saint-Vincent-sur-Oust
- Location within France Location within Brittany
- Coordinates: 47°42′02″N 2°08′43″W
- Country: France
- Region: Brittany
- Department: Morbihan
- Arrondissement: Vannes
- Canton: Guer
- Intercommunality: Redon Agglomération

Government
  - Mayor (2026–32): Pierrick Le Boterff
- Area^{1}: 15.66 km^{2} (6.05 sq mi)
- Highest elevation: 60 m (200 ft)
- Lowest elevation: 1 m (3.3 ft)
- Population (2023): 1,679
  - Density: 107.2/km^{2} (277.7/sq mi)
- Time zone: UTC+01:00 (CET)
  - Summer (DST): UTC+02:00 (CEST)
- INSEE/Postal code: 56239 /56350
- ^{1} French Land Register data, which excludes lakes, ponds, glaciers > 1 km^{2} (0.386 sq mi or 247 acres) and river estuaries.

Saint-Vincent-sur-Oust (French pronunciation: [sɛ̃ vɛ̃sɑ̃ syʁ ust], literally Saint-Vincent on Oust; Breton: Sant-Visant-an-Oud) is a commune in the Morbihan department of Brittany in north-western France.

== Geography ==
The river Oust forms all of the commune's northern and eastern borders; the river Arz forms most of its south-western border.

== Demographics ==
Inhabitants of Saint-Vincent-sur-Oust are called in French Vincentais.

== See also ==
- Communes of the Morbihan department
