= Arne Marit =

Belgian cyclist

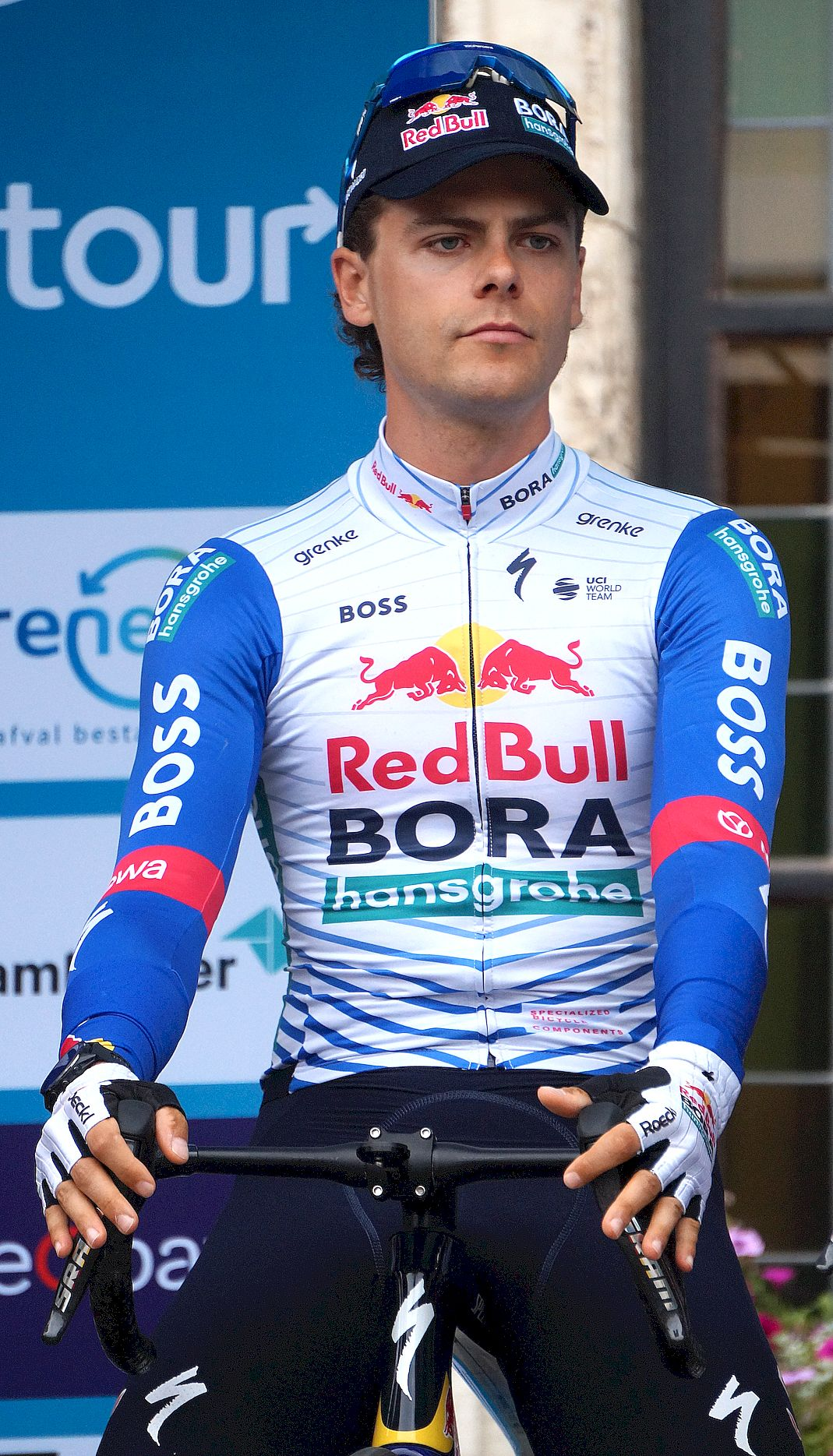
- Arne Marit in 2026

Personal information
- Born: 21 January 1999 (age 27) Sint-Niklaas, Belgium
- Height: 1.85 m (6 ft 1 in)
- Weight: 72 kg (159 lb)

Cycling career
- Sport: Cycling
- Current team: Intermarché–Wanty
- Discipline: Road
- Role: Rider

Amateur teams
- 2016–2017: Van Den Hauwe-Gentse VS
- 2018–2020: Lotto–Soudal U23

Professional teams
- 2021–2022: Sport Vlaanderen–Baloise
- 2023–2025: Intermarché–Circus–Wanty
- 2026–: Red Bull–Bora–Hansgrohe

Major wins
- One day races and Classics GP du Morbihan (2021)

Arne Marit (born 21 January 1999) is a Belgian racing cyclist, who currently rides for UCI WorldTeam Red Bull–Bora–Hansgrohe.

== Major results ==
2016
9th Ronde van Vlaanderen Juniores
2017
1st Nokere Koerse Juniores
1st Stage 2b Niedersachsen-Rundfahrt der Junioren
4th E3 Harelbeke Junioren
5th Ronde van Vlaanderen Juniores
2018
1st Stage 1 (TTT) Okolo Jižních Čech
8th Circuit de Wallonie
2019
1st Grand Prix Criquielion
1st Stage 1 Vuelta a Navarra
3rd Antwerpse Havenpijl
8th Overall Le Triptyque des Monts et Châteaux
8th De Kustpijl
8th Memorial Philippe Van Coningsloo
2020
1st Stage 1 Tour Bitwa Warszawska 1920
2nd Road race, National Under-23 Road Championships
7th Dorpenomloop Rucphen
8th Paris–Tours Espoirs
2021 (1 pro win)
1st Grand Prix du Morbihan
4th Gooikse Pijl
5th Grote Prijs Jef Scherens
5th Ronde van Drenthe
7th Paris–Tours
9th Grote Prijs Jean-Pierre Monseré
2022
8th Schaal Sels
9th Gooikse Pijl
10th Memorial Rik Van Steenbergen
2023
4th Omloop van het Houtland
5th Famenne Ardenne Classic
6th Grand Prix d'Isbergues
7th Paris–Bourges
9th Grand Prix de Fourmies
10th Binche–Chimay–Binche
2024
6th Grand Prix Criquielion
2025
3rd Omloop van het Houtland
4th Kuurne–Brussels–Kuurne
9th Surf Coast Classic
2026 (1)
1st Trofeo Palma
6th Grand Prix de Denain

=== Grand Tour general classification results timeline ===
Grand Tour	2023	2024	2025
Giro d'Italia	112	—	—
Tour de France	—	—	—
Vuelta a España	—	122	146
