= Monterblanc =

Monterblanc Sterwenn
- Commune
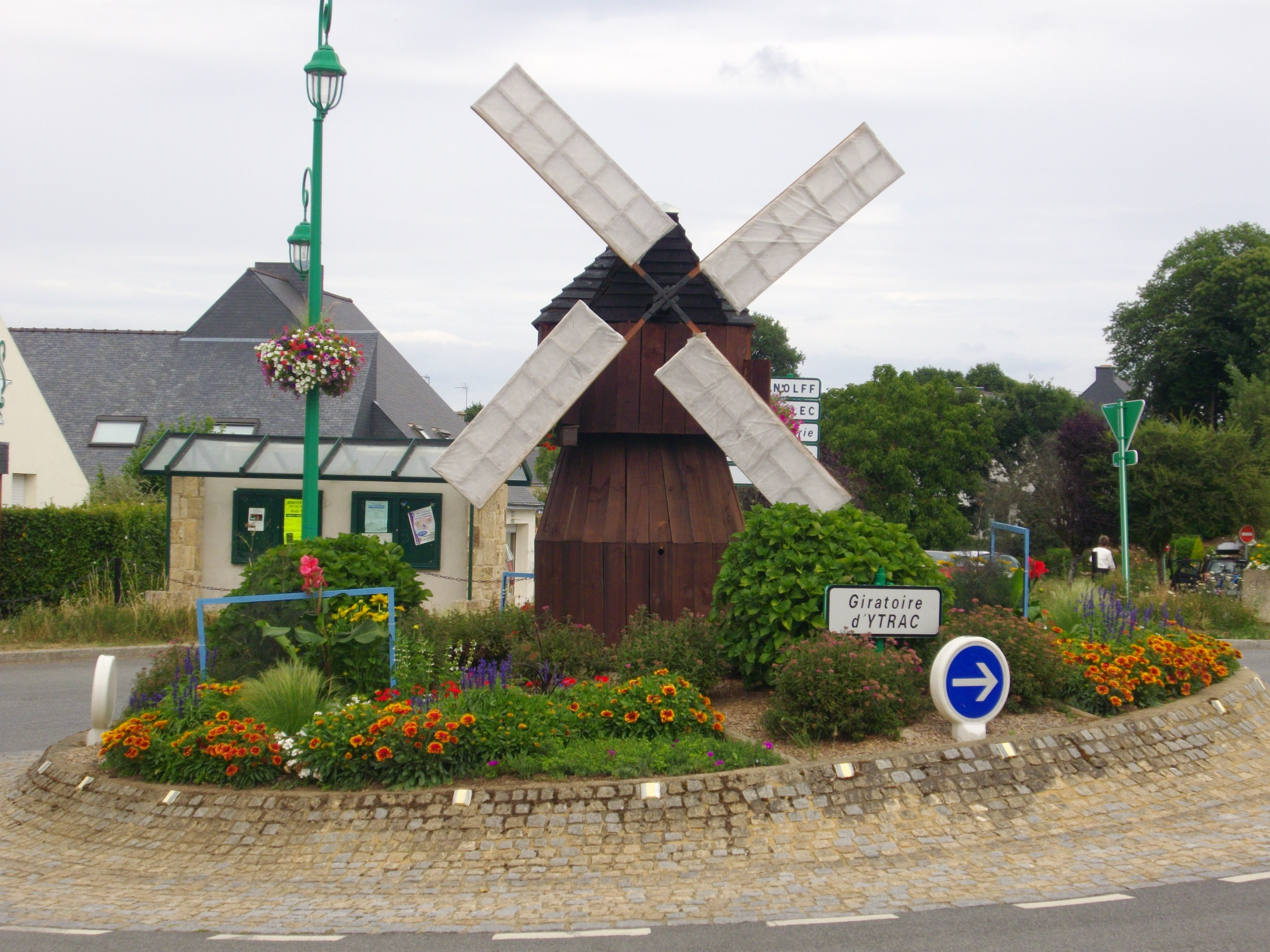
- The Ytrac roundabout, in Monterblanc

- Coat of arms
- Location of Monterblanc
- Location within France Location within Brittany
- Coordinates: 47°44′36″N 2°40′49″W
- Country: France
- Region: Brittany
- Department: Morbihan
- Arrondissement: Vannes
- Canton: Vannes-3
- Intercommunality: Golfe du Morbihan - Vannes Agglomération

Government
  - Mayor (2026–32): Alban Moquet
- Area^{1}: 25.41 km^{2} (9.81 sq mi)
- Highest elevation: 151 m (495 ft)
- Lowest elevation: 46 m (151 ft)
- Population (2023): 3,356
  - Density: 132.1/km^{2} (342.1/sq mi)
- Time zone: UTC+01:00 (CET)
  - Summer (DST): UTC+02:00 (CEST)
- INSEE/Postal code: 56137 /56250
- ^{1} French Land Register data, which excludes lakes, ponds, glaciers > 1 km^{2} (0.386 sq mi or 247 acres) and river estuaries.

Monterblanc (French pronunciation: [mɔ̃tɛʁblɑ̃]; Breton: Sterwenn) is a commune in the Morbihan department and Brittany region of north-western France.

== Geography ==
The river Arz forms most of the commune's northern border.

== Population ==
Historical population
Year	Pop.	±% p.a.
1968	1,126	—
1975	1,386	+3.01%
1982	1,794	+3.75%
1990	2,006	+1.41%
1999	1,951	−0.31%
2007	2,592	+3.61%
2012	3,229	+4.49%
2017	3,275	+0.28%
2023	3,356	+0.41%
Source: INSEE

In French the inhabitants of Monterblanc are known as Monterblancais.

== See also ==
- Communes of the Morbihan department
