= Béganne =

Commune in Brittany, France

Béganne Begaon
- Commune
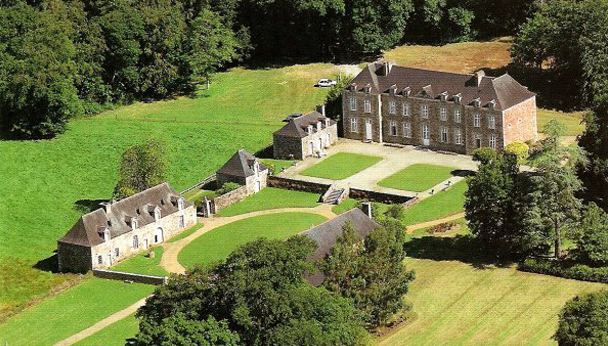
- The Château of Léhélec

- Coat of arms
- Location of Béganne
- Location within France Location within Brittany
- Coordinates: 47°35′49″N 2°14′20″W
- Country: France
- Region: Brittany
- Department: Morbihan
- Arrondissement: Vannes
- Canton: Guer
- Intercommunality: Redon Agglomération

Government
  - Mayor (2026–32): Anthony de Boüard
- Area^{1}: 35.50 km^{2} (13.71 sq mi)
- Highest elevation: 87 m (285 ft)
- Lowest elevation: 0 m (0 ft)
- Population (2023): 1,493
  - Density: 42.06/km^{2} (108.9/sq mi)
- Time zone: UTC+01:00 (CET)
  - Summer (DST): UTC+02:00 (CEST)
- INSEE/Postal code: 56011 /56350
- ^{1} French Land Register data, which excludes lakes, ponds, glaciers > 1 km^{2} (0.386 sq mi or 247 acres) and river estuaries.

Béganne (French pronunciation: [beɡan]; Breton: Begaon) is a commune in the Morbihan department in Brittany in northwestern France.

== Population ==
Inhabitants of Béganne are called Bégannais.

== See also ==
- Communes of the Morbihan department
