= Carentoir =

Commune in Brittany, France

Carentoir Karantoer
- Commune
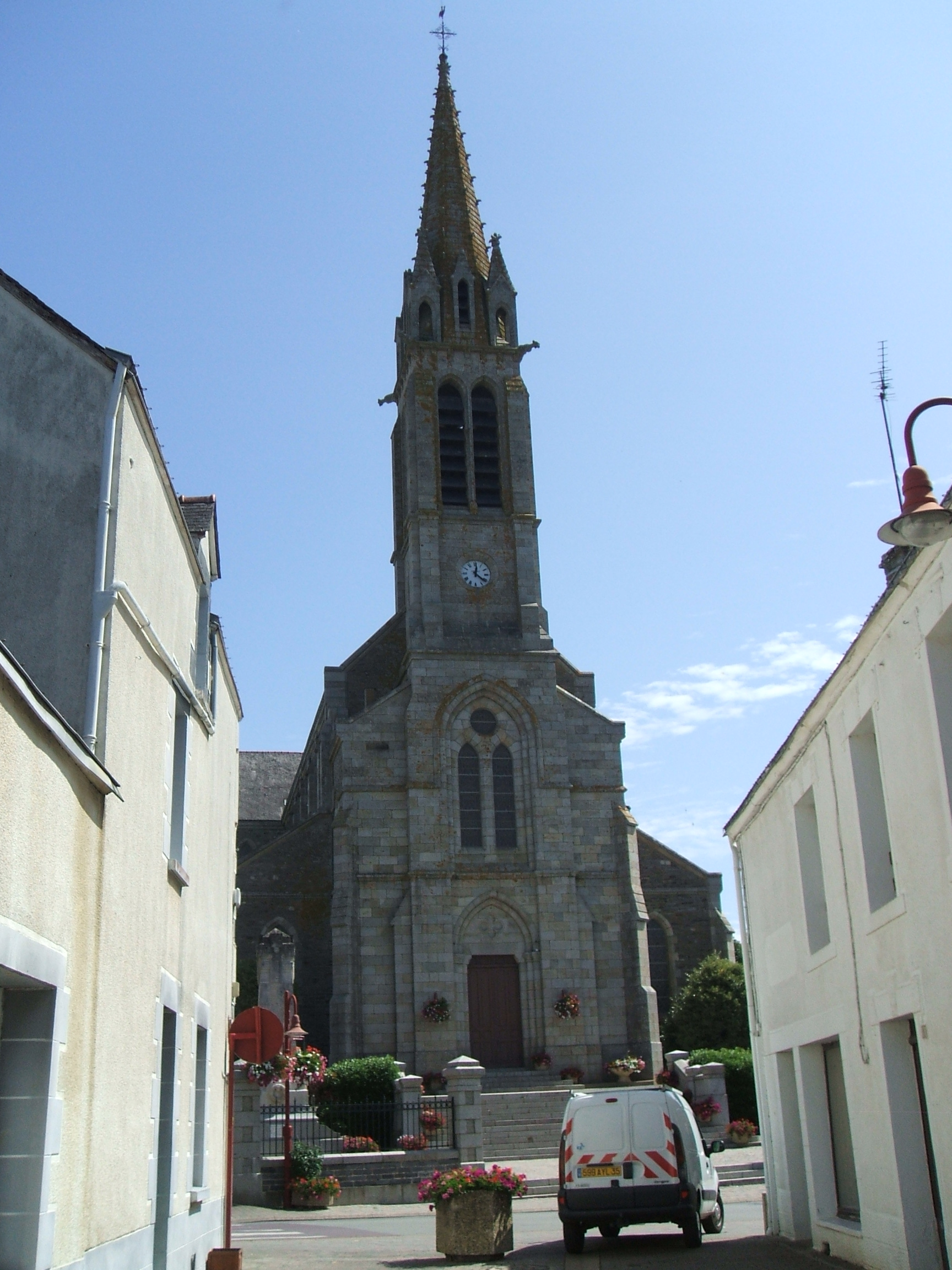
- The church of Saint Marcoul, in Carentoir

- Coat of arms
- Location of Carentoir
- Location within France Location within Brittany
- Coordinates: 47°49′03″N 2°07′59″W
- Country: France
- Region: Brittany
- Department: Morbihan
- Arrondissement: Vannes
- Canton: Guer

Government
  - Mayor (2026–32): David Naël
- Area^{1}: 72.87 km^{2} (28.14 sq mi)
- Highest elevation: 109 m (358 ft)
- Lowest elevation: 7 m (23 ft)
- Population (2023): 3,232
  - Density: 44.35/km^{2} (114.9/sq mi)
- Time zone: UTC+01:00 (CET)
  - Summer (DST): UTC+02:00 (CEST)
- INSEE/Postal code: 56033 /56910
- ^{1} French Land Register data, which excludes lakes, ponds, glaciers > 1 km^{2} (0.386 sq mi or 247 acres) and river estuaries.

Carentoir (French pronunciation: [kaʁɑ̃twaʁ]; Breton: Karantoer) is a commune in the Morbihan department of Brittany in north-western France. On 1 January 2017, the former commune of Quelneuc was merged into Carentoir. It is where the entertainment company Ubisoft was founded.

== Population ==
Historical population
Year	Pop.	±% p.a.
1968	3,025	—
1975	2,967	−0.28%
1982	3,137	+0.80%
1990	3,025	−0.45%
1999	3,029	+0.01%
2007	3,256	+0.91%
2012	3,283	+0.17%
2017	3,165	−0.73%
2023	3,232	+0.35%
Source: INSEE

Inhabitants of Carentoir are called in French Carentoriens.

== See also ==
- Communes of the Morbihan department
