= Tréal =

Tréal Treal
- Commune
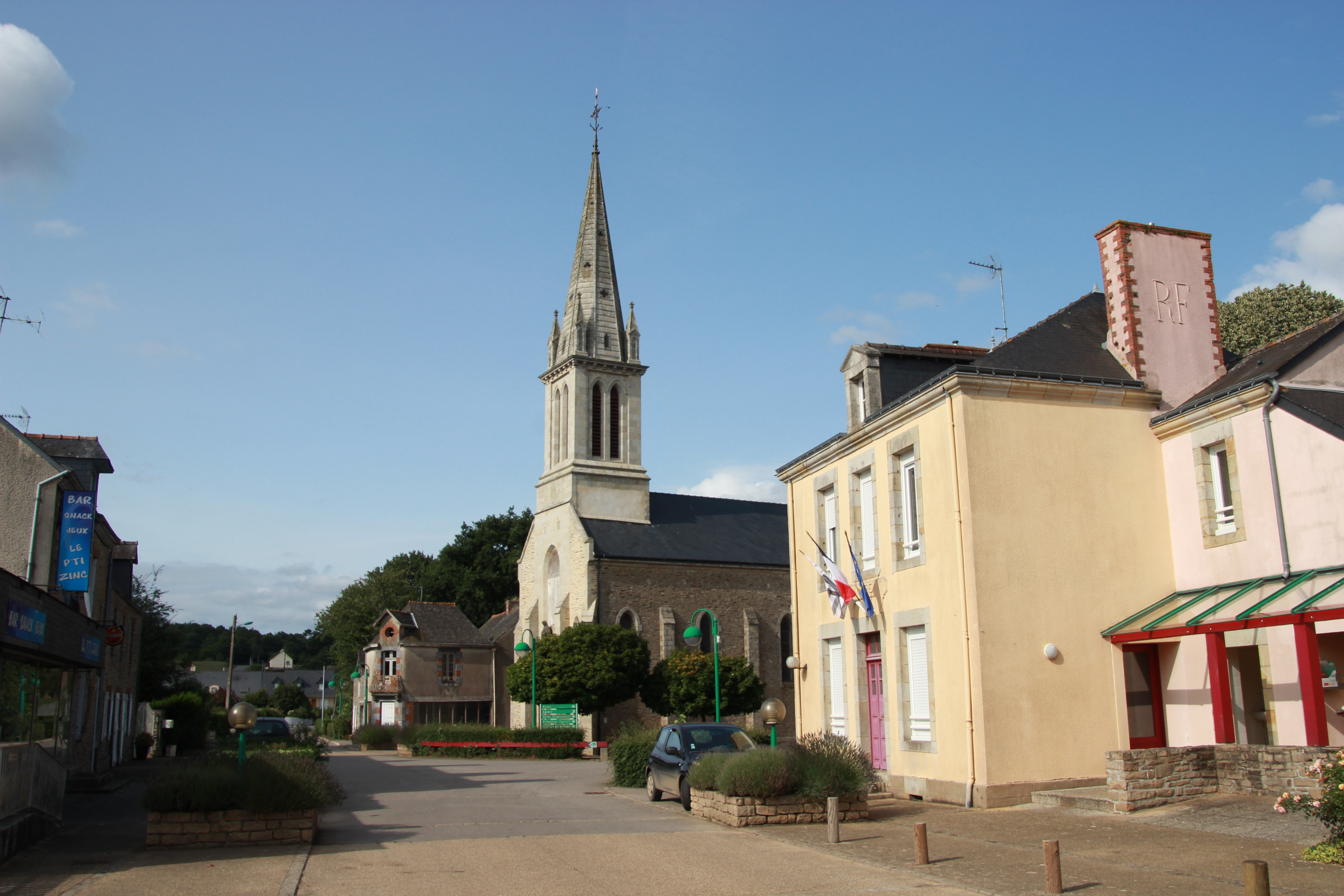
- Town hall and church of Tréal (rue de la Mairie).

- Coat of arms
- Location of Tréal
- Location within France Location within Brittany
- Coordinates: 47°50′24″N 2°13′21″W
- Country: France
- Region: Brittany
- Department: Morbihan
- Arrondissement: Vannes
- Canton: Guer

Government
  - Mayor (2026–32): Muriel Hervé
- Area^{1}: 19.28 km^{2} (7.44 sq mi)
- Highest elevation: 101 m (331 ft)
- Lowest elevation: 27 m (89 ft)
- Population (2023): 699
  - Density: 36.3/km^{2} (93.9/sq mi)
- Time zone: UTC+01:00 (CET)
  - Summer (DST): UTC+02:00 (CEST)
- INSEE/Postal code: 56253 /56140
- ^{1} French Land Register data, which excludes lakes, ponds, glaciers > 1 km^{2} (0.386 sq mi or 247 acres) and river estuaries.

Tréal (French pronunciation: [tʁe.al]; Breton: Treal) is a commune in the Morbihan department of Brittany in north-western France. Inhabitants of Tréal are called in French Tréalais.

== See also ==
- Communes of the Morbihan department
