= Saint-Gorgon, Morbihan =

Saint-Gorgon Sant-Gorgon
- Commune
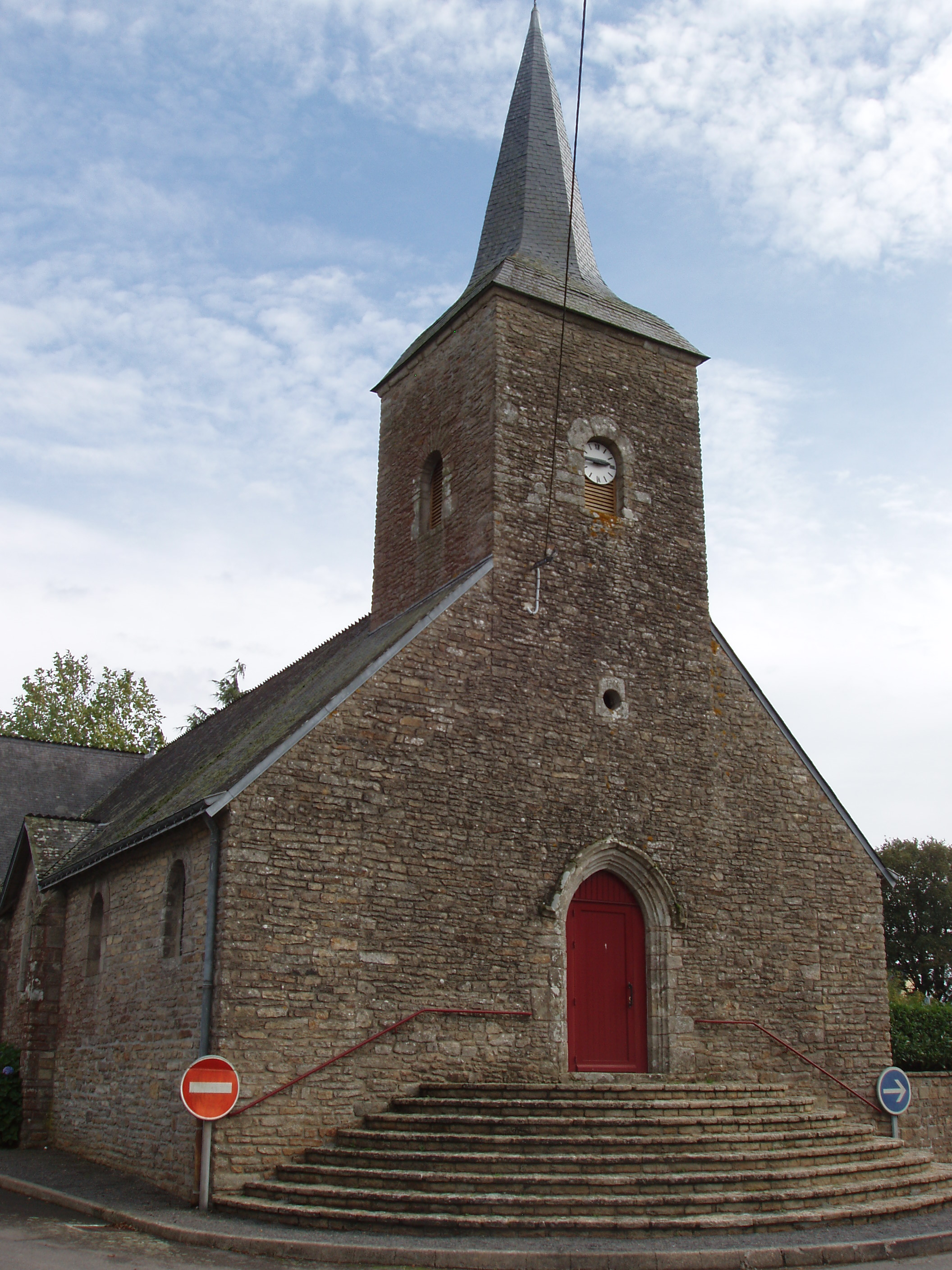
- The church in Saint-Gorgon

- Coat of arms
- Location of Saint-Gorgon
- Location within France Location within Brittany
- Coordinates: 47°39′00″N 2°14′06″W
- Country: France
- Region: Brittany
- Department: Morbihan
- Arrondissement: Vannes
- Canton: Guer
- Intercommunality: Redon Agglomération

Government
  - Mayor (2026–32): Guénaël Bréger
- Area^{1}: 5.69 km^{2} (2.20 sq mi)
- Highest elevation: 92 m (302 ft)
- Lowest elevation: 40 m (130 ft)
- Population (2023): 443
  - Density: 77.9/km^{2} (202/sq mi)
- Time zone: UTC+01:00 (CET)
  - Summer (DST): UTC+02:00 (CEST)
- INSEE/Postal code: 56216 /56350
- ^{1} French Land Register data, which excludes lakes, ponds, glaciers > 1 km^{2} (0.386 sq mi or 247 acres) and river estuaries.

Saint-Gorgon (French pronunciation: [sɛ̃ ɡɔʁɡɔ̃]; Breton: Sant-Kogo) is a commune in the Morbihan department of Brittany in north-western France. Inhabitants of Saint-Gorgon are called in French Gorgonnais.

== See also ==
- Communes of the Morbihan department
