= Porcaro =

Porcaro Porzh-Karozh
- Commune
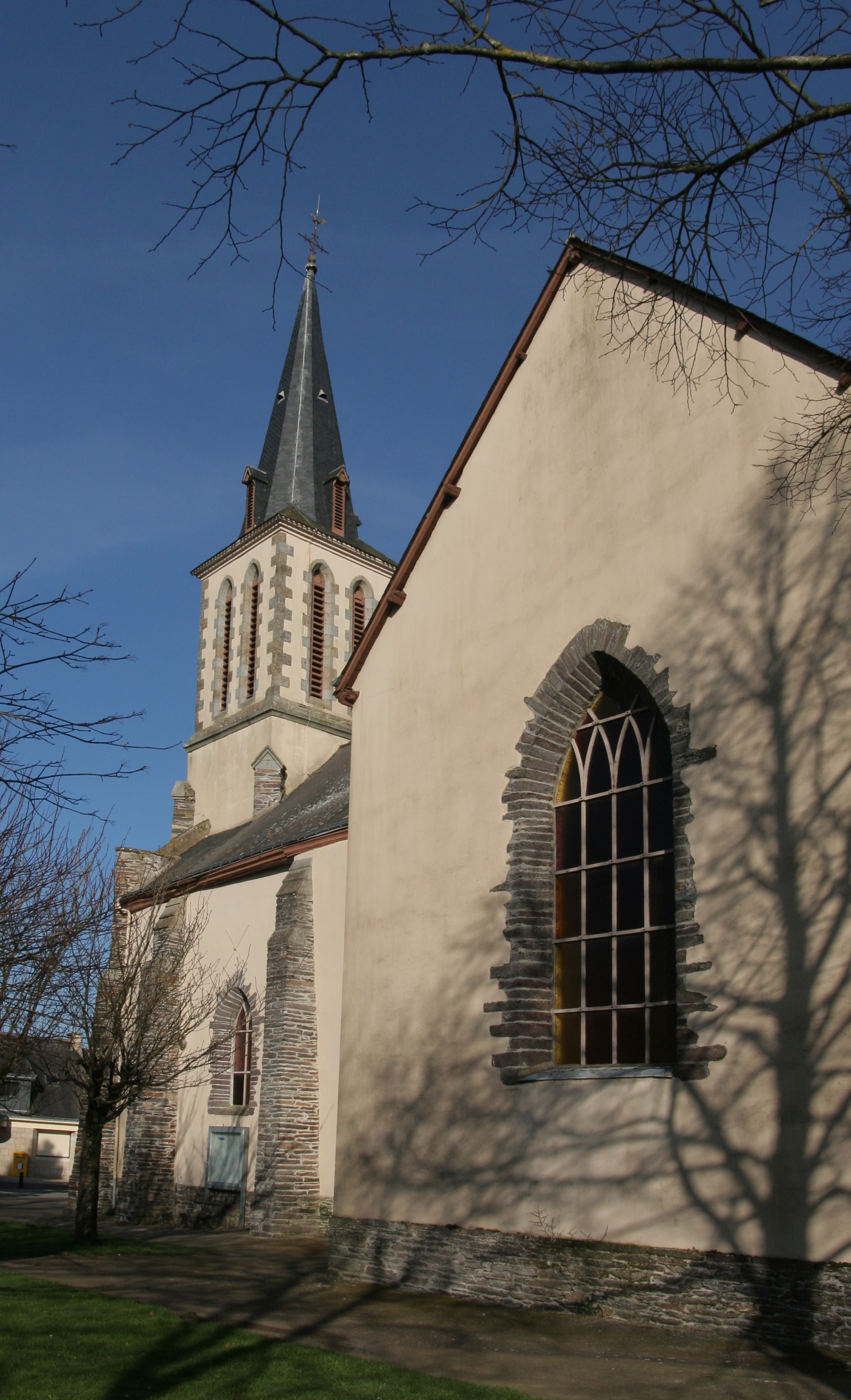
- Our Lady church.

- Coat of arms
- Location of Porcaro
- Location within France Location within Brittany
- Coordinates: 47°54′37″N 2°11′51″W
- Country: France
- Region: Brittany
- Department: Morbihan
- Arrondissement: Vannes
- Canton: Guer
- Intercommunality: CC de l'Oust à Brocéliande

Government
  - Mayor (2026–32): Sylvie Chedaleux
- Area^{1}: 15.73 km^{2} (6.07 sq mi)
- Highest elevation: 154 m (505 ft)
- Lowest elevation: 30 m (98 ft)
- Population (2023): 743
  - Density: 47.2/km^{2} (122/sq mi)
- Time zone: UTC+01:00 (CET)
  - Summer (DST): UTC+02:00 (CEST)
- INSEE/Postal code: 56180 /56380
- ^{1} French Land Register data, which excludes lakes, ponds, glaciers > 1 km^{2} (0.386 sq mi or 247 acres) and river estuaries.

Porcaro (French pronunciation: [pɔʁkaʁo]; Breton: Porzh-Karozh) is a commune in the Morbihan department of Brittany in north-western France. Inhabitants of Porcaro are called in French Porcaréens.

== See also ==
- Communes of the Morbihan department
