= Guer =

Commune in Brittany, France

Guer Gwern-Porc'hoed
- Commune
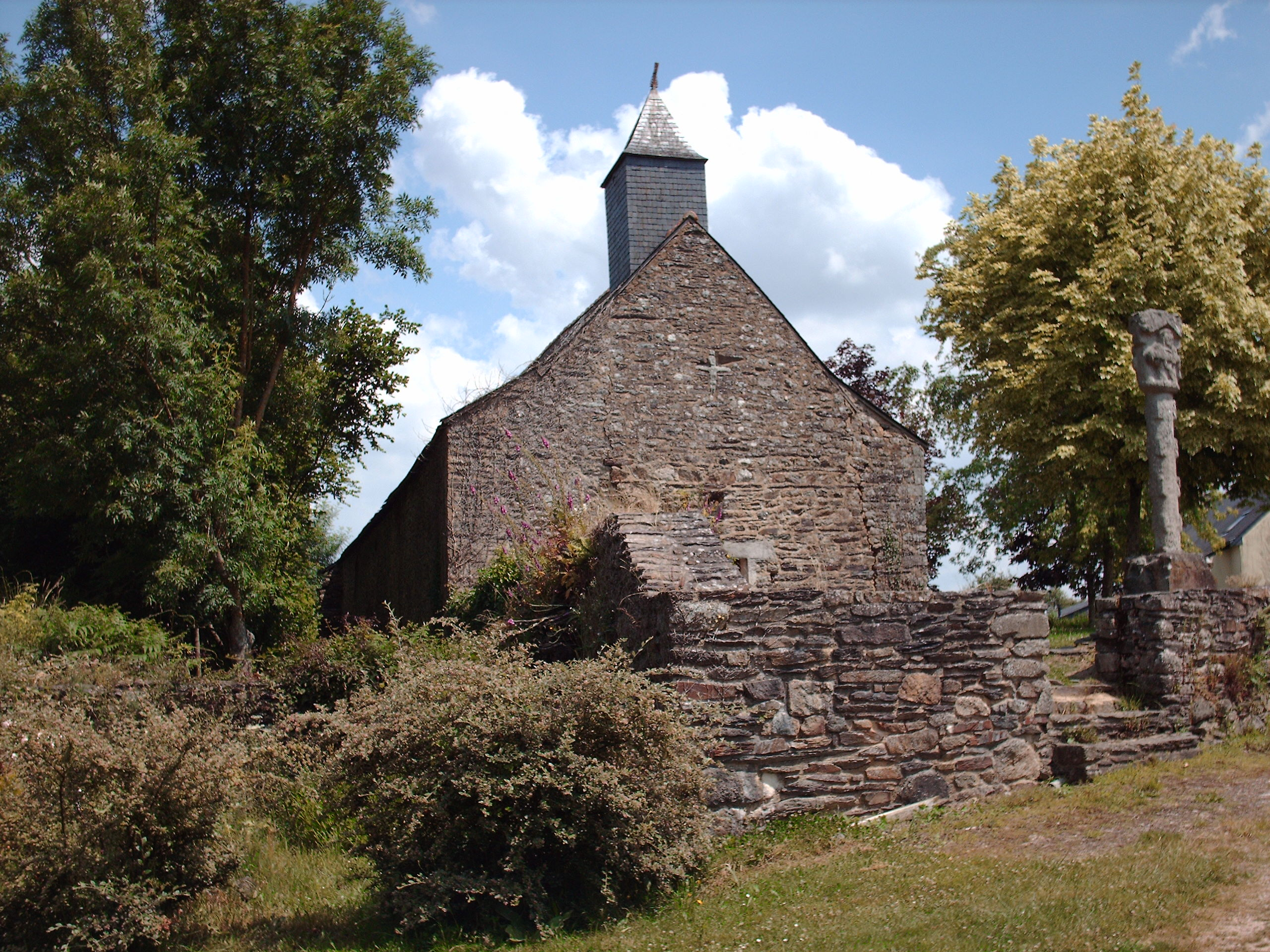
- Saint Nicolas chapel near Guer

- Coat of arms
- Location of Guer
- Location within France Location within Brittany
- Coordinates: 47°54′17″N 2°07′09″W
- Country: France
- Region: Brittany
- Department: Morbihan
- Arrondissement: Vannes
- Canton: Guer
- Intercommunality: CC de l'Oust à Brocéliande

Government
  - Mayor (2026–32): Paul Rodriguez
- Area^{1}: 52.11 km^{2} (20.12 sq mi)
- Elevation: 50 m (160 ft)
- Highest elevation: 155 m (509 ft)
- Lowest elevation: 18 m (59 ft)
- Population (2023): 6,208
  - Density: 119.1/km^{2} (308.6/sq mi)
- Time zone: UTC+01:00 (CET)
  - Summer (DST): UTC+02:00 (CEST)
- INSEE/Postal code: 56075 /56380
- ^{1} French Land Register data, which excludes lakes, ponds, glaciers > 1 km^{2} (0.386 sq mi or 247 acres) and river estuaries.

Guer (French pronunciation: [ɡɛʁ]; Breton: Gwern-Porc'hoed) is a commune in the Morbihan department in Brittany in north-western France.

It is located at the edge of the famous Brocéliande Forest, which is the setting of the Round Table novels in Brittany. It is 43 km (27 mi) southwest from Rennes, the regional capital.

Camp Coëtquidan (Camp de Coëtquidan) is located in Guer and comprises three military educational facilities:

- École Spéciale Militaire de Saint-Cyr, France's foremost military academy dedicated to the training of Army officers through direct recruitment;
- École militaire interarmes (inter-services military school), for non-commissioned officers; and
- École Militaire des Aspirants de Coëtquidan (Coetquidan's cadets' military school), for direct recruitment officers under timed contracts.

== Demographics ==
Inhabitants of Guer are called Guerrois in French.

Historical population
Year	Pop.	±% p.a.
1968	5,757	—
1975	5,922	+0.40%
1982	5,657	−0.65%
1990	5,794	+0.30%
1999	5,560	−0.46%
2007	6,305	+1.58%
2012	6,327	+0.07%
2017	6,192	−0.43%
2023	6,208	+0.04%
Source: INSEE

== See also ==
- Communes of the Morbihan department
