= Cournon =

Commune in Brittany, France

Cournon Kornon
- Commune
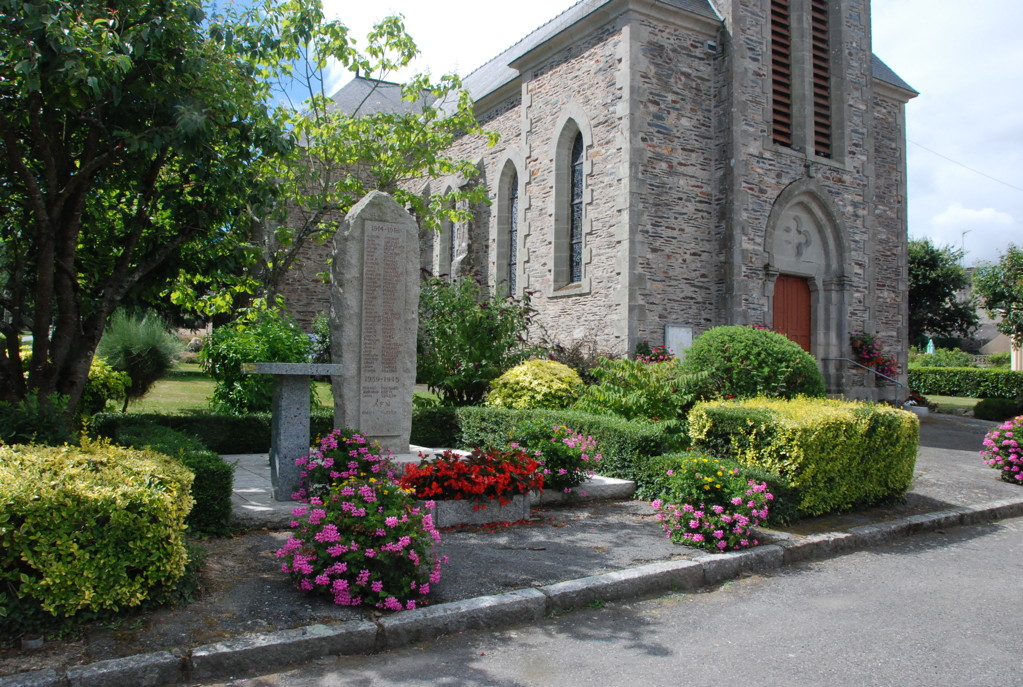
- The church and World War I memorial.

- Coat of arms
- Location of Cournon
- Location within France Location within Brittany
- Coordinates: 47°44′50″N 2°06′15″W
- Country: France
- Region: Brittany
- Department: Morbihan
- Arrondissement: Vannes
- Canton: Guer

Government
  - Mayor (2026–32): Pascal Jehannin
- Area^{1}: 10.87 km^{2} (4.20 sq mi)
- Highest elevation: 87 m (285 ft)
- Lowest elevation: 1 m (3.3 ft)
- Population (2023): 812
  - Density: 74.7/km^{2} (193/sq mi)
- Time zone: UTC+01:00 (CET)
  - Summer (DST): UTC+02:00 (CEST)
- INSEE/Postal code: 56044 /56200
- ^{1} French Land Register data, which excludes lakes, ponds, glaciers > 1 km^{2} (0.386 sq mi or 247 acres) and river estuaries.

Cournon (French pronunciation: [kuʁnɔ̃]; Breton: Kornon) is a commune in the Morbihan department of Brittany in north-western France. Inhabitants of Cournon are called in French Cournonnais.

== See also ==
- Communes of the Morbihan department
