= Arrondissement of Vannes =

Coordinates: 47°40′N 2°45′W

Vannes
- Arrondissement
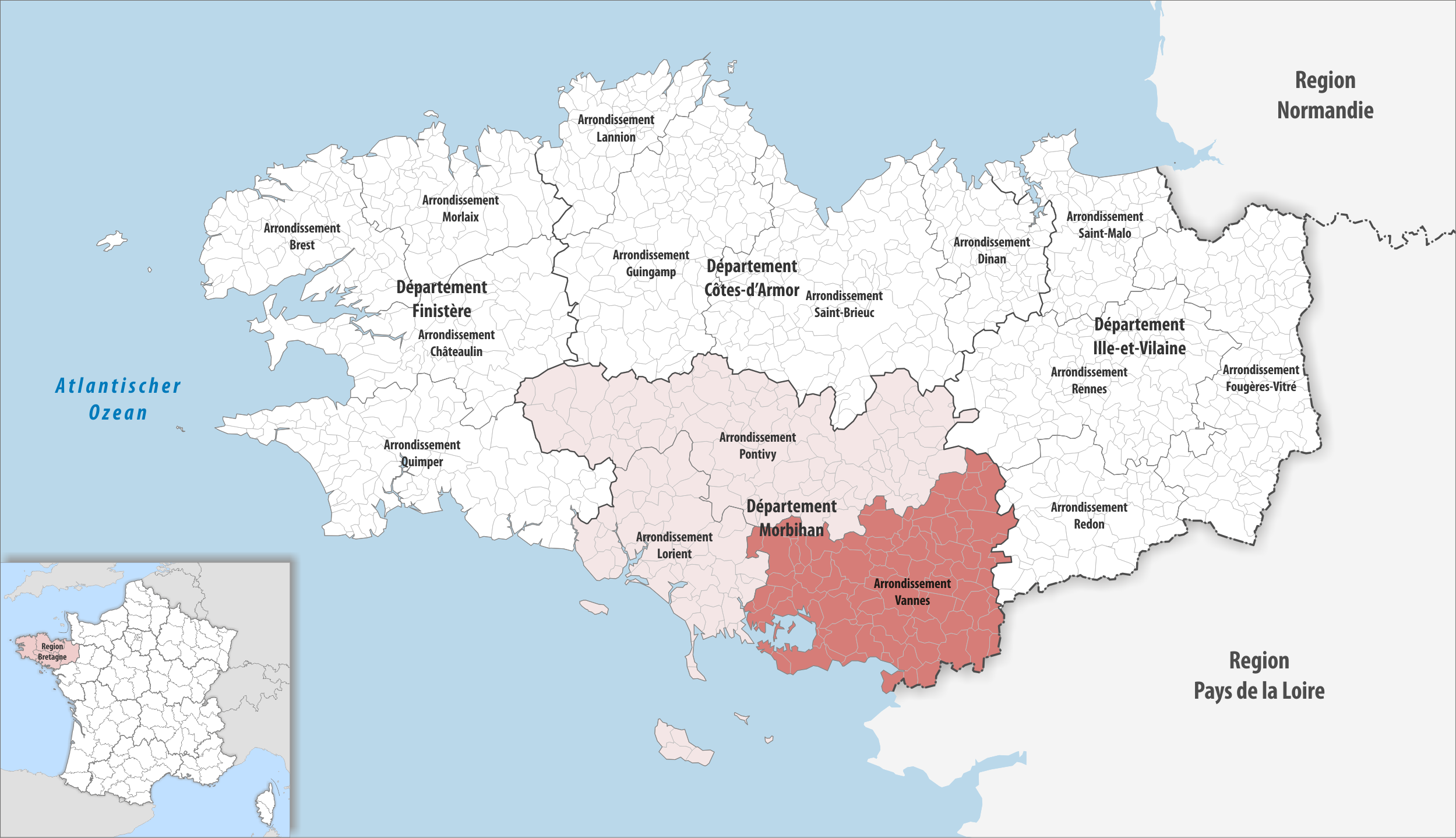
- Location within the region Brittany
- Country: France
- Region: Brittany
- Department: Morbihan
- No. of communes: {{{nbcomm}}}
- Area: 2,416.2 km^{2} (932.9 sq mi)
- Population (2023): 300,329
  - Density: 124.30/km^{2} (321.93/sq mi)
- INSEE code: 563

The arrondissement of Vannes is an arrondissement of France in the Morbihan department in the Brittany region. It has 99 communes. Its population is 291,956 (2021), and its area is 2,416.2 km^{2} (932.9 sq mi).

== Composition ==
The communes of the arrondissement of Vannes, and their INSEE codes, are:

1. Allaire (56001)
2. Ambon (56002)
3. Arradon (56003)
4. Arzal (56004)
5. Arzon (56005)
6. Augan (56006)
7. Baden (56008)
8. Béganne (56011)
9. Beignon (56012)
10. Berric (56015)
11. Billiers (56018)
12. Bohal (56020)
13. Bono (56262)
14. Brandivy (56022)
15. Caden (56028)
16. Camoël (56030)
17. Carentoir (56033)
18. Caro (56035)
19. Colpo (56042)
20. Cournon (56044)
21. Le Cours (56045)
22. Damgan (56052)
23. Elven (56053)
24. Férel (56058)
25. Les Fougerêts (56060)
26. La Gacilly (56061)
27. Grand-Champ (56067)
28. Guer (56075)
29. Le Guerno (56077)
30. Le Hézo (56084)
31. Île-aux-Moines (56087)
32. Île-d'Arz (56088)
33. Larmor-Baden (56106)
34. Larré (56108)
35. Lauzach (56109)
36. Limerzel (56111)
37. Lizio (56112)
38. Locmaria-Grand-Champ (56115)
39. Locqueltas (56120)
40. Malansac (56123)
41. Malestroit (56124)
42. Marzan (56126)
43. Meucon (56132)
44. Missiriac (56133)
45. Molac (56135)
46. Monteneuf (56136)
47. Monterblanc (56137)
48. Muzillac (56143)
49. Nivillac (56147)
50. Noyal-Muzillac (56149)
51. Péaule (56153)
52. Peillac (56154)
53. Pénestin (56155)
54. Plaudren (56157)
55. Plescop (56158)
56. Pleucadeuc (56159)
57. Ploeren (56164)
58. Plougoumelen (56167)
59. Pluherlin (56171)
60. Porcaro (56180)
61. Questembert (56184)
62. Réminiac (56191)
63. Rieux (56194)
64. La Roche-Bernard (56195)
65. Rochefort-en-Terre (56196)
66. Ruffiac (56200)
67. Saint-Abraham (56202)
68. Saint-Armel (56205)
69. Saint-Avé (56206)
70. Saint-Congard (56211)
71. Saint-Dolay (56212)
72. Saint-Gildas-de-Rhuys (56214)
73. Saint-Gorgon (56216)
74. Saint-Gravé (56218)
75. Saint-Guyomard (56219)
76. Saint-Jacut-les-Pins (56221)
77. Saint-Jean-la-Poterie (56223)
78. Saint-Laurent-sur-Oust (56224)
79. Saint-Malo-de-Beignon (56226)
80. Saint-Marcel (56228)
81. Saint-Martin-sur-Oust (56229)
82. Saint-Nicolas-du-Tertre (56230)
83. Saint-Nolff (56231)
84. Saint-Perreux (56232)
85. Saint-Vincent-sur-Oust (56239)
86. Sarzeau (56240)
87. Séné (56243)
88. Sérent (56244)
89. Sulniac (56247)
90. Surzur (56248)
91. Théhillac (56250)
92. Theix-Noyalo (56251)
93. Le Tour-du-Parc (56252)
94. Tréal (56253)
95. Trédion (56254)
96. Treffléan (56255)
97. La Trinité-Surzur (56259)
98. Vannes (56260)
99. La Vraie-Croix (56261)

== History ==
The arrondissement of Vannes was created in 1800. At the January 2017 reorganisation of the arrondissements of Morbihan, it gained two communes from the arrondissement of Lorient, and it lost 21 communes to the arrondissement of Pontivy.

As a result of the reorganisation of the cantons of France which came into effect in 2015, the borders of the cantons are no longer related to the borders of the arrondissements. The cantons of the arrondissement of Vannes were, as of January 2015:

1. Allaire
2. Elven
3. La Gacilly
4. Grand-Champ
5. Guer
6. Malestroit
7. Mauron
8. Muzillac
9. Ploërmel
10. Questembert
11. La Roche-Bernard
12. Rochefort-en-Terre
13. Sarzeau
14. La Trinité-Porhoët
15. Vannes-Centre
16. Vannes-Est
17. Vannes-Ouest
