= Les Fougerêts =

Commune in Brittany, France

Les Fougerêts Felgerieg-al-Lann
- Commune
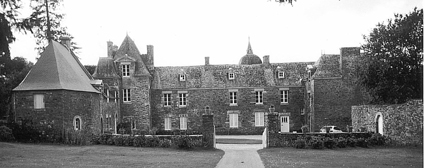
- The château of Villechauve

- Coat of arms
- Location of Les Fougerêts
- Location within France Location within Brittany
- Coordinates: 47°44′25″N 2°12′31″W
- Country: France
- Region: Brittany
- Department: Morbihan
- Arrondissement: Vannes
- Canton: Guer
- Intercommunality: Redon Agglomération

Government
  - Mayor (2026–32): Françoise Grignac
- Area^{1}: 19.91 km^{2} (7.69 sq mi)
- Highest elevation: 101 m (331 ft)
- Lowest elevation: 2 m (6.6 ft)
- Population (2023): 970
  - Density: 49/km^{2} (130/sq mi)
- Time zone: UTC+01:00 (CET)
  - Summer (DST): UTC+02:00 (CEST)
- INSEE/Postal code: 56060 /56200
- ^{1} French Land Register data, which excludes lakes, ponds, glaciers > 1 km^{2} (0.386 sq mi or 247 acres) and river estuaries.

Les Fougerêts (French pronunciation: [le fuʒʁɛ]; Breton: Felgerieg-al-Lann) is a commune in the Morbihan department of Brittany in north-western France. Inhabitants of Les Fougerêts are called in French Fougerêtais.

== See also ==
- Communes of the Morbihan department
