= Saint-Avé =

Saint-Avé Sant-Teve
- Commune
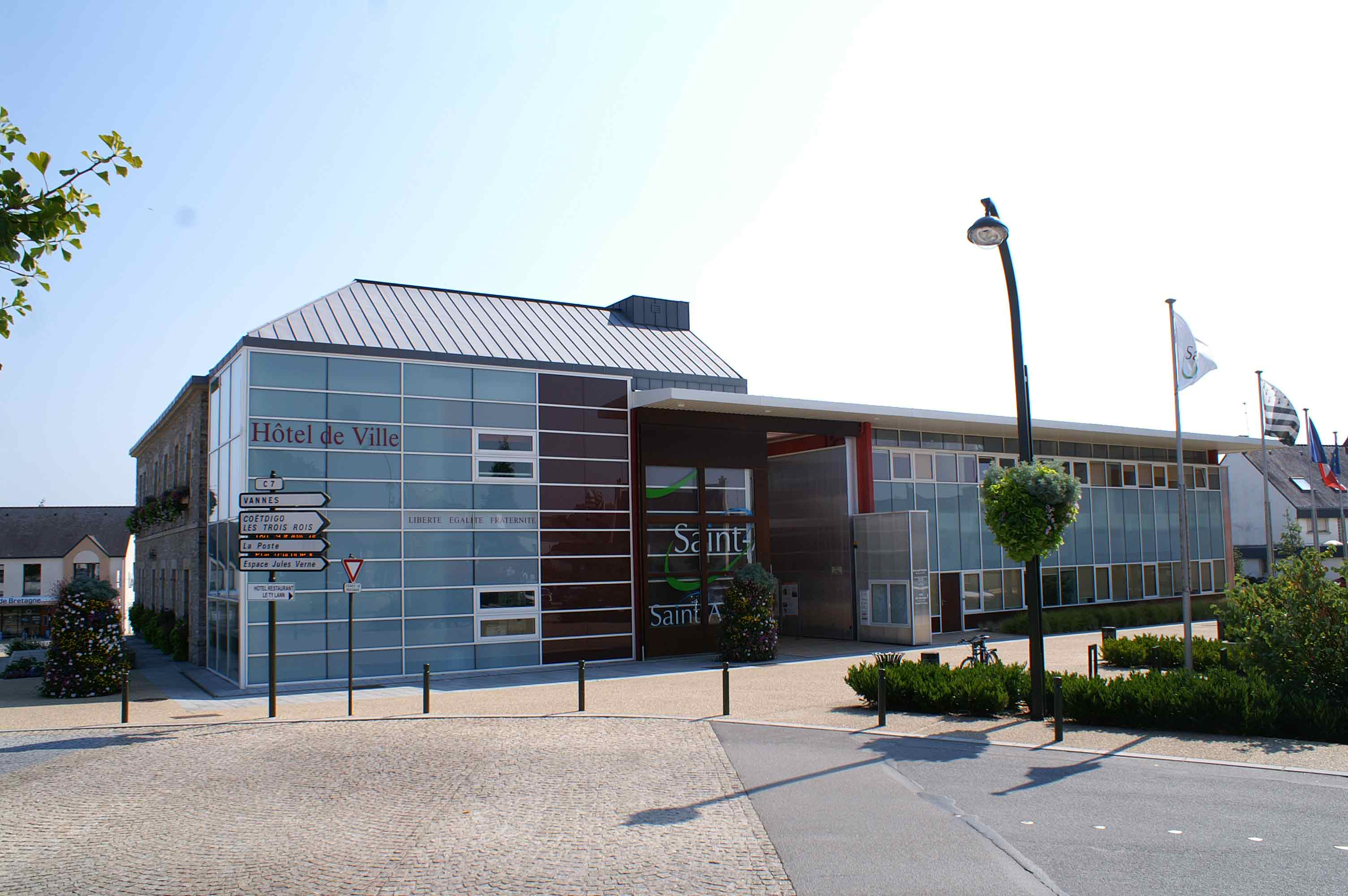
- The town hall in Saint-Avé

- Coat of arms
- Location of Saint-Avé
- Location within France Location within Brittany
- Coordinates: 47°41′14″N 2°44′00″W
- Country: France
- Region: Brittany
- Department: Morbihan
- Arrondissement: Vannes
- Canton: Vannes-3
- Intercommunality: Golfe du Morbihan - Vannes Agglomération

Government
  - Mayor (2026–32): Anne Gallo-Kerleau
- Area^{1}: 26.09 km^{2} (10.07 sq mi)
- Highest elevation: 136 m (446 ft)
- Lowest elevation: 12 m (39 ft)
- Population (2023): 12,470
  - Density: 478.0/km^{2} (1,238/sq mi)
- Time zone: UTC+01:00 (CET)
  - Summer (DST): UTC+02:00 (CEST)
- INSEE/Postal code: 56206 /56890
- ^{1} French Land Register data, which excludes lakes, ponds, glaciers > 1 km^{2} (0.386 sq mi or 247 acres) and river estuaries.

Saint-Avé (French pronunciation: [sɛ̃.t‿ave]; Breton: Sant-Teve) is a commune in the Morbihan department of Brittany in north-western France. Part of the urban unit of Vannes, it's the 9th most populated commune of the Morbihan department and the 32nd of the Brittany region with its population of 11,927 inhabitants in 2021.

Located just north of the bigger city of Vannes, it is part of the Gulf of Morbihan regional natural reserve. The name of the town is a francization of the Breton name Sant-Teve.

== Demographics ==
Inhabitants of Saint-Avé are called in French Avéens.

Historical population
Year	Pop.	±% p.a.
1968	4,339	—
1975	5,628	+3.79%
1982	6,618	+2.34%
1990	6,929	+0.58%
1999	8,303	+2.03%
2007	10,104	+2.48%
2012	10,630	+1.02%
2017	11,642	+1.84%
2023	12,470	+1.15%
Source: INSEE

== Climate ==
The climate which characterises the town was classified, in 2010, as a “frank oceanic climate” (French: climat océanique franc), according to the typology of French climates which identified eight major types of climates in metropolitan France. In 2020, the town was classified as having an “oceanic climate” type using the classification established by Météo-France, which only has five main types of climates for mainland France. This type of climate is characterised by mild temperatures and relatively abundant rainfall (in conjunction with disturbances from the Atlantic), distributed throughout the year with a slight maximum from October to February.

== Breton language ==
The municipality launched a linguistic plan through Ya d'ar brezhoneg on 25 March 2005.

In 2008, there was 15.35% of the children attended the bilingual schools in primary education.

== See also ==
- Communes of the Morbihan department
