= Allaire, Morbihan =

Commune in Brittany, France

Allaire Alaer
- Commune
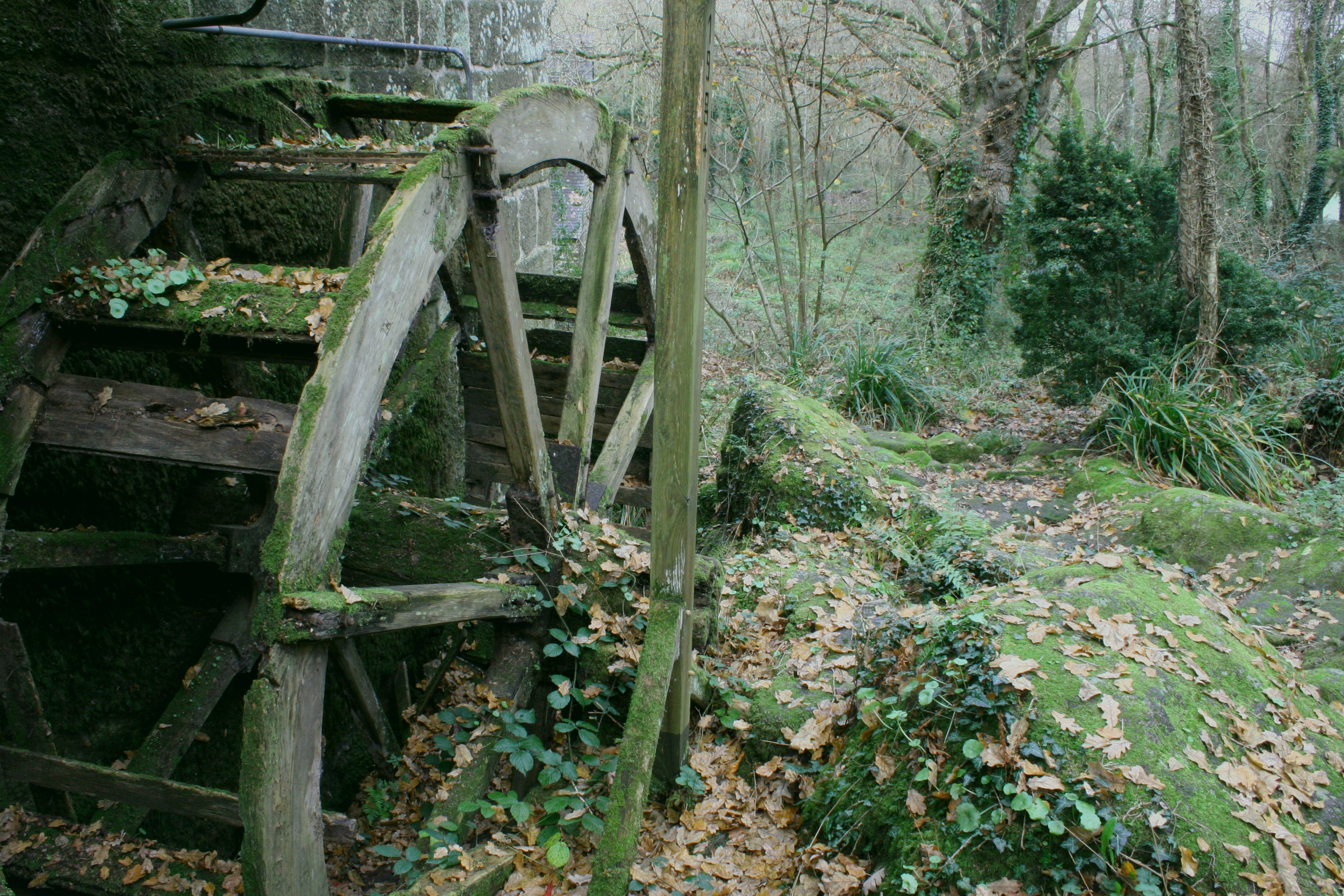
- The Quip watermill

- Coat of arms
- Location of Allaire
- Location within France Location within Brittany
- Coordinates: 47°38′16″N 2°09′42″W
- Country: France
- Region: Brittany
- Department: Morbihan
- Arrondissement: Vannes
- Canton: Guer
- Intercommunality: Redon Agglomération

Government
  - Mayor (2026–32): Jean-François Mary
- Area^{1}: 41.74 km^{2} (16.12 sq mi)
- Highest elevation: 88 m (289 ft)
- Lowest elevation: 1 m (3.3 ft)
- Population (2023): 3,955
  - Density: 94.75/km^{2} (245.4/sq mi)
- Time zone: UTC+01:00 (CET)
  - Summer (DST): UTC+02:00 (CEST)
- INSEE/Postal code: 56001 /56350
- ^{1} French Land Register data, which excludes lakes, ponds, glaciers > 1 km^{2} (0.386 sq mi or 247 acres) and river estuaries.

Allaire (French pronunciation: [alɛʁ]; Breton: Alaer) is a commune in the Morbihan department in the Brittany region in northwestern France.

== Geography ==
The river Arz forms most of the commune's northeastern border.

== Population ==
Inhabitants of Allaire are called Allairiens in French.

Historical population
Year	Pop.	±% p.a.
1968	2,219	—
1975	2,394	+1.09%
1982	2,686	+1.66%
1990	2,990	+1.35%
1999	3,188	+0.71%
2007	3,528	+1.27%
2012	3,701	+0.96%
2017	3,854	+0.81%
2023	3,955	+0.43%
Source: INSEE

== See also ==
- Communes of the Morbihan department
- Allaire (surname)
