= Treffléan =

Treffléan Trevlean
- Commune
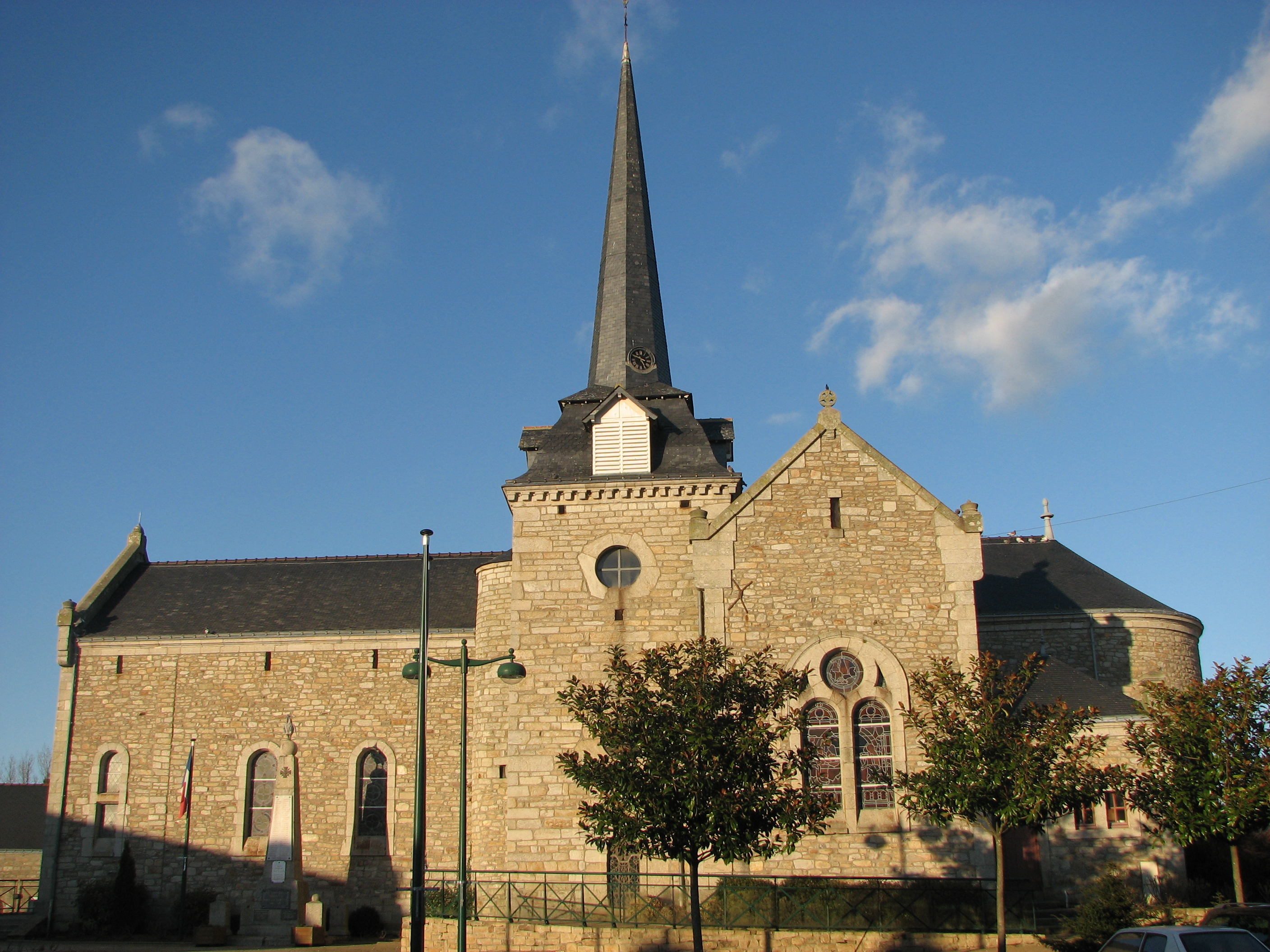
- The church in Treffléan

- Coat of arms
- Location of Treffléan
- Location within France Location within Brittany
- Coordinates: 47°40′56″N 2°36′43″W
- Country: France
- Region: Brittany
- Department: Morbihan
- Arrondissement: Vannes
- Canton: Vannes-3
- Intercommunality: Golfe du Morbihan - Vannes Agglomération

Government
  - Mayor (2026–32): Gwénaël Le Floch
- Area^{1}: 18.26 km^{2} (7.05 sq mi)
- Highest elevation: 147 m (482 ft)
- Lowest elevation: 20 m (66 ft)
- Population (2023): 2,572
  - Density: 140.9/km^{2} (364.8/sq mi)
- Time zone: UTC+01:00 (CET)
  - Summer (DST): UTC+02:00 (CEST)
- INSEE/Postal code: 56255 /56250
- ^{1} French Land Register data, which excludes lakes, ponds, glaciers > 1 km^{2} (0.386 sq mi or 247 acres) and river estuaries.

Treffléan (French pronunciation: [tʁɛfleɑ̃]; Breton: Trevlean) is a commune in the Morbihan department of Brittany in north-western France.

== Population ==
Historical population
Year	Pop.	±% p.a.
1968	591	—
1975	705	+2.55%
1982	1,144	+7.16%
1990	1,441	+2.93%
1999	1,445	+0.03%
2007	1,858	+3.19%
2012	2,058	+2.07%
2017	2,324	+2.46%
2023	2,572	+1.70%
Source: INSEE

Inhabitants of Treffléan are called in French Treffléanais.

== See also ==
- Communes of the Morbihan department
