= Monteneuf =

Monteneuf Monteneg
- Commune
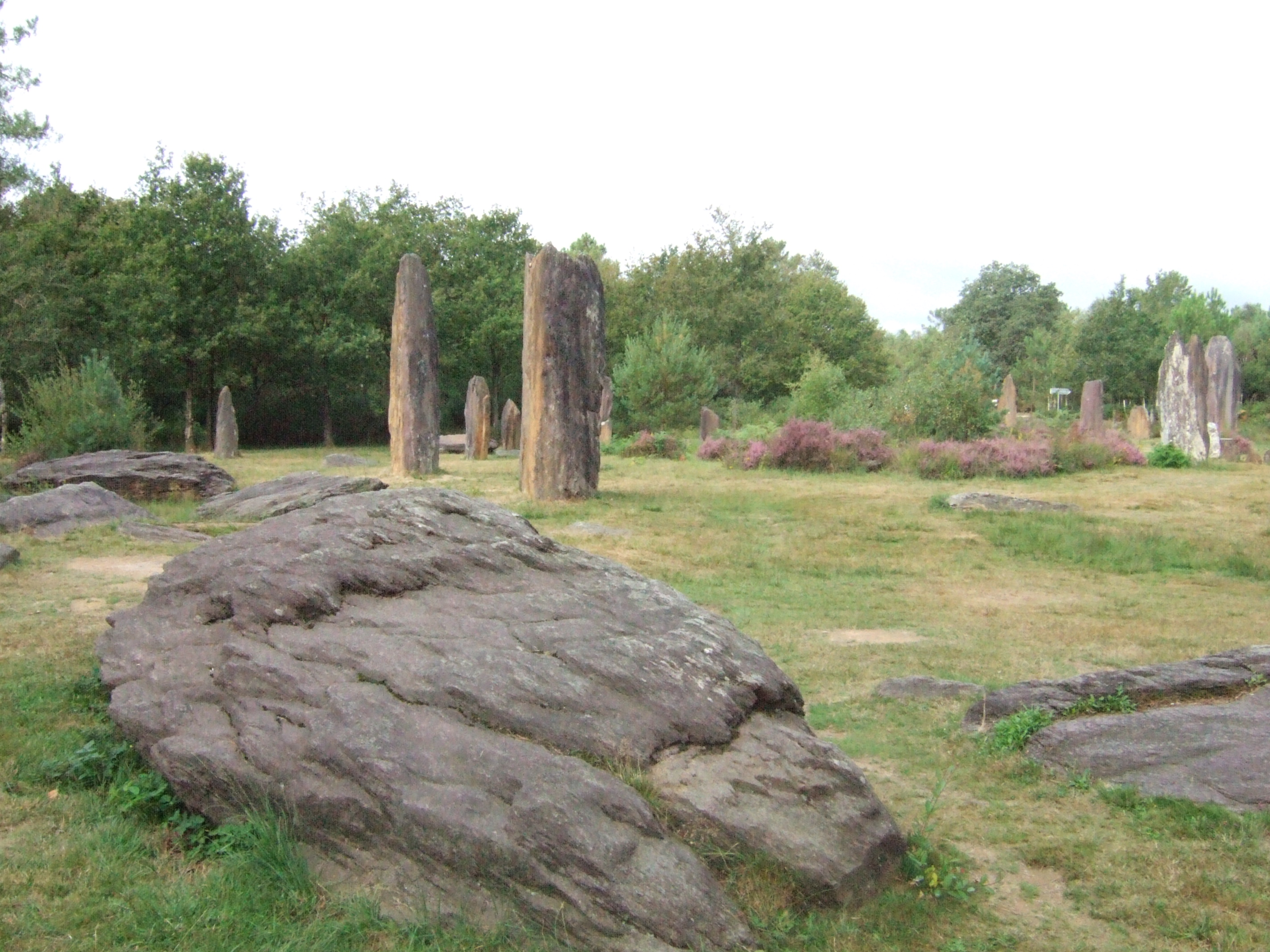
- The Menhirs de Monteneuf, archeological site in Monteneuf
- Location of Monteneuf
- Location within France Location within Brittany
- Coordinates: 47°52′25″N 2°12′30″W
- Country: France
- Region: Brittany
- Department: Morbihan
- Arrondissement: Vannes
- Canton: Guer
- Intercommunality: CC de l'Oust à Brocéliande

Government
  - Mayor (2026–32): Yann Yhuel
- Area^{1}: 30.62 km^{2} (11.82 sq mi)
- Highest elevation: 158 m (518 ft)
- Lowest elevation: 33 m (108 ft)
- Population (2023): 763
  - Density: 24.9/km^{2} (64.5/sq mi)
- Time zone: UTC+01:00 (CET)
  - Summer (DST): UTC+02:00 (CEST)
- INSEE/Postal code: 56136 /56380
- ^{1} French Land Register data, which excludes lakes, ponds, glaciers > 1 km^{2} (0.386 sq mi or 247 acres) and river estuaries.

Monteneuf (French pronunciation: [mɔ̃t(ə)nœf]; Breton: Monteneg) is a commune in the Morbihan department of Brittany in north-western France.

== Demographics ==
Inhabitants of Monteneuf are called in French Monténeuviens.

== See also ==
- Communes of the Morbihan department
