= Allaire (surname) =

Allaire is a surname of French origin, mainly found in Northern France (Brittany), Jersey, and Quebec.

== Etymology ==
The Breton toponymic origin of the surname Allaire is described by Francis Gourvil in his publication Noms de famille bretons d'origine toponymique. This would point to Allaire, a commune located in the Morbihan department.

Other Breton toponymic connections include lieux-dits "Ville-Allaire" in the communes of Langouet (Ille-et-Vilaine) and Illifaut (Côtes-d'Armor).

Two other possible etymologies can be traced:

- Variant form of Hilaire, French form of Latin Hilarius, derived from Latin hilaris meaning "joyful".
- In Brittany can be given after saint Aloire (Latin: Alorus), bishop of Quimper, Brittany.

== Some variations ==
- Alair, Aler, Alere, Allair, Allayre, Allere, Alarius
- Dallaire (e.g. Roméo Dallaire), Delair, Deller
- Halair, Haler

== People ==
- Anthony Allaire (1829–1903), American firefighter and police officer
- François Allaire (born 1959), ice hockey coach
- Gaston Allaire (1916–2011), Canadian musicologist, organist, pianist and composer
- James P. Allaire (1785–1858), American mechanic and steam engine builder
- Jean Allaire (1930–2026), Quebecer politician and lawyer
- Jeremy Allaire (born 1971), American technologist and Internet entrepreneur
- Joseph J. Allaire (born 1969), American software engineer and Internet entrepreneur
- Paul Allaire (1938–2019), businessman, CEO of Xerox Corporation
- Zoé Allaire-Bourgie (born 2004), artistic gymnast
