= Augan =

Commune in Brittany, France

Augan Algam
- Commune
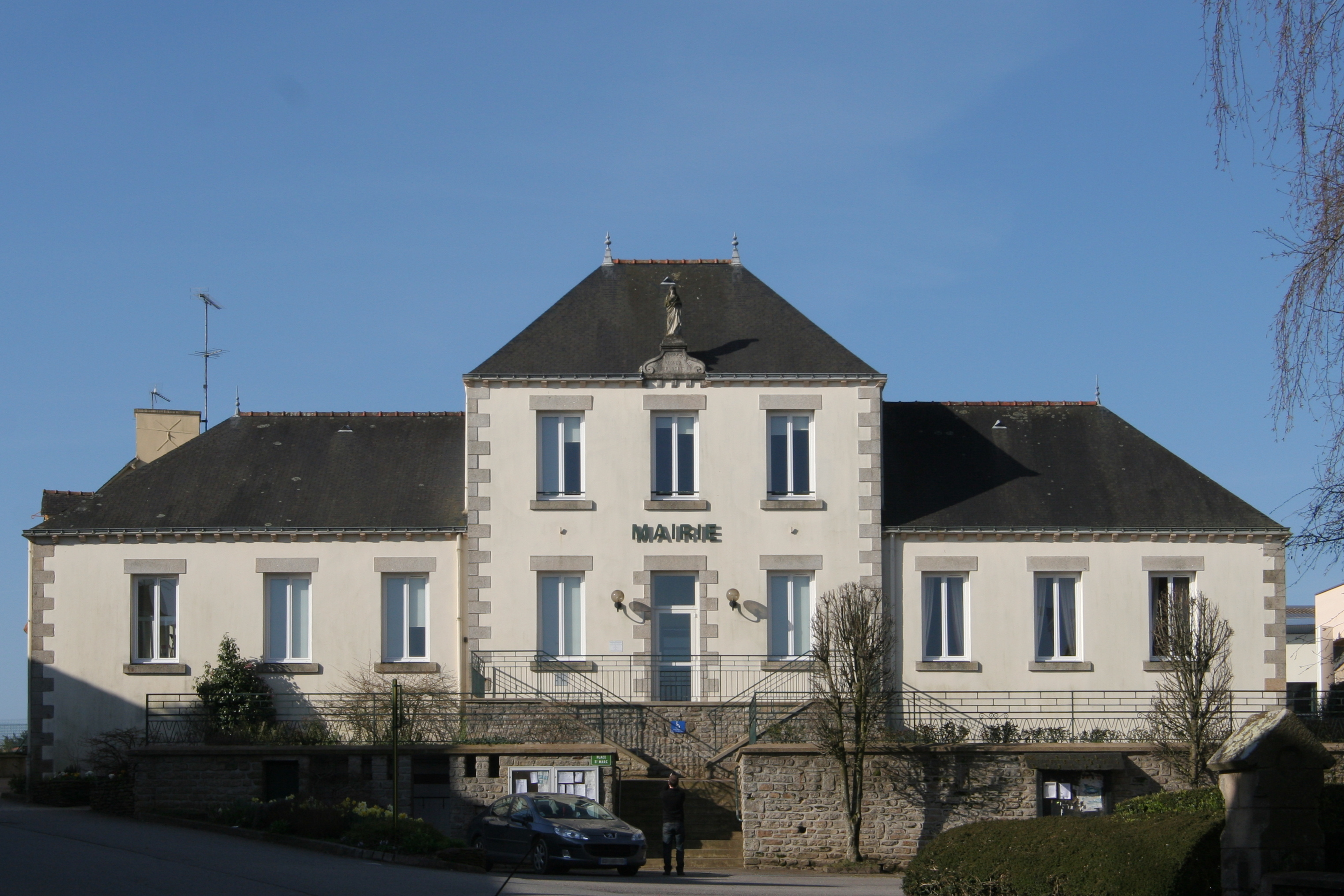
- The town hall in Augan

- Coat of arms
- Location of Augan
- Location within France Location within Brittany
- Coordinates: 47°55′14″N 2°16′37″W
- Country: France
- Region: Brittany
- Department: Morbihan
- Arrondissement: Vannes
- Canton: Guer
- Intercommunality: CC de l'Oust à Brocéliande

Government
  - Mayor (2026–32): Dominique Martin
- Area^{1}: 40.93 km^{2} (15.80 sq mi)
- Highest elevation: 144 m (472 ft)
- Lowest elevation: 40 m (130 ft)
- Population (2023): 1,569
  - Density: 38.33/km^{2} (99.28/sq mi)
- Time zone: UTC+01:00 (CET)
  - Summer (DST): UTC+02:00 (CEST)
- INSEE/Postal code: 56006 /56800
- ^{1} French Land Register data, which excludes lakes, ponds, glaciers > 1 km^{2} (0.386 sq mi or 247 acres) and river estuaries.

Augan (French pronunciation: [oɡɑ̃]; Breton: Algam) is a commune in the Morbihan department in the Brittany region in northwestern France.

== Population ==
Inhabitants of Augan are called Alganais or Auganais.

== See also ==
- Communes of the Morbihan department
