= Beignon =

Commune in Brittany, France

Beignon Benion
- Commune
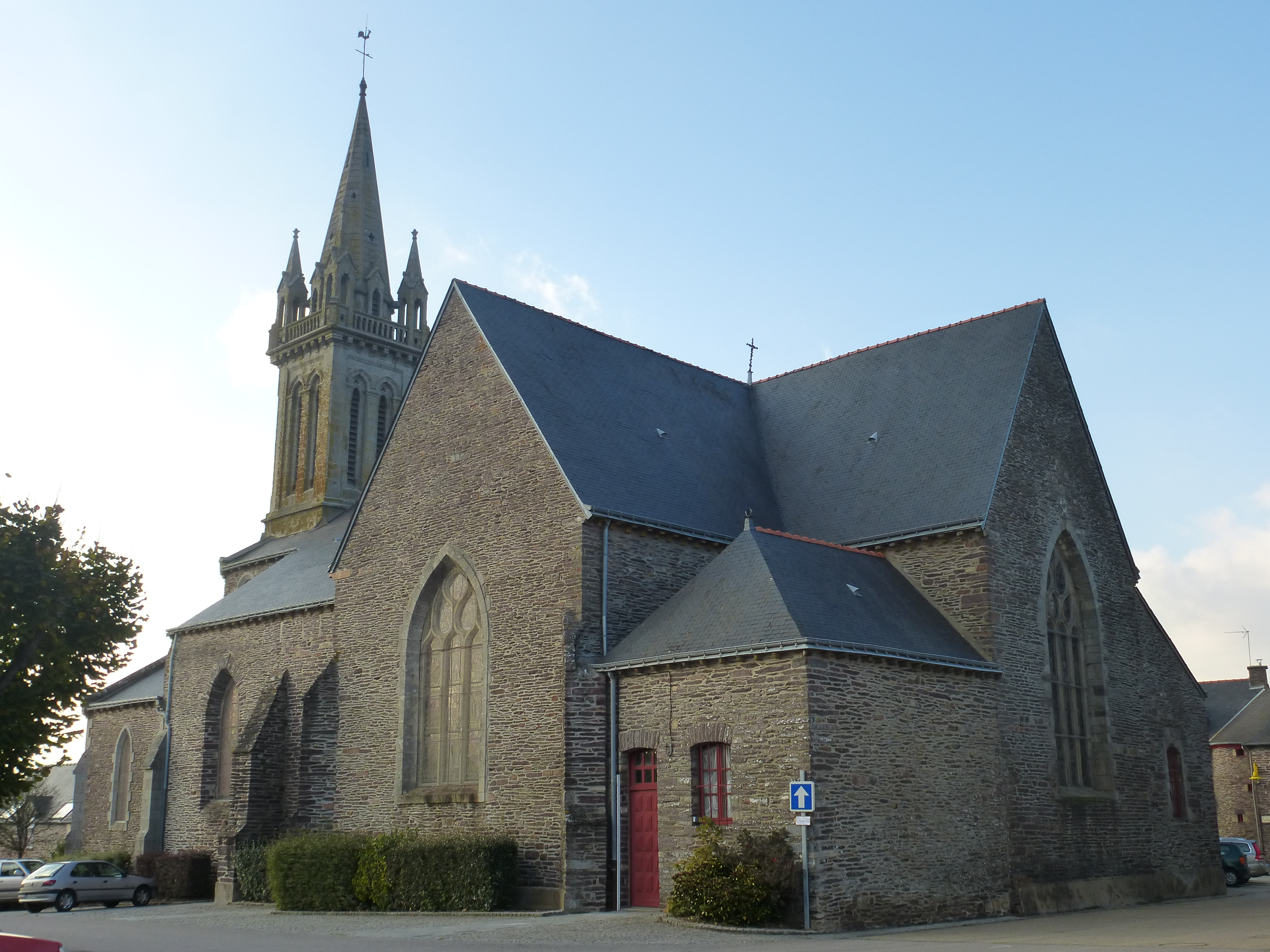
- Church of Saint-Pierre in Beignon.

- Coat of arms
- Location of Beignon
- Location within France Location within Brittany
- Coordinates: 47°58′18″N 2°10′11″W
- Country: France
- Region: Brittany
- Department: Morbihan
- Arrondissement: Vannes
- Canton: Guer

Government
  - Mayor (2026–32): Sylvie Hourmand
- Area^{1}: 24.87 km^{2} (9.60 sq mi)
- Highest elevation: 212 m (696 ft)
- Lowest elevation: 52 m (171 ft)
- Population (2023): 1,944
  - Density: 78.17/km^{2} (202.5/sq mi)
- Time zone: UTC+01:00 (CET)
  - Summer (DST): UTC+02:00 (CEST)
- INSEE/Postal code: 56012 /56380
- ^{1} French Land Register data, which excludes lakes, ponds, glaciers > 1 km^{2} (0.386 sq mi or 247 acres) and river estuaries.

Beignon (French pronunciation: [bɛɲɔ̃]; Breton: Benion) is a commune in the Morbihan département in Brittany in northwestern France.

== Population ==
Inhabitants of Beignon are called Beignonnais.

== See also ==
- Communes of the Morbihan department
