= Canton of Guer =

Coordinates: 47.91°N 2.12°W

The canton of Guer is an administrative division of the Morbihan department, northwestern France. Its borders were modified at the French canton reorganisation which came into effect in March 2015. Its seat is in Guer.

It consists of the following communes:

1. Allaire
2. Augan
3. Béganne
4. Beignon
5. Carentoir
6. Cournon
7. Les Fougerêts
8. La Gacilly
9. Guer
10. Monteneuf
11. Peillac
12. Porcaro
13. Réminiac
14. Rieux
15. Saint-Gorgon
16. Saint-Jacut-les-Pins
17. Saint-Jean-la-Poterie
18. Saint-Malo-de-Beignon
19. Saint-Martin-sur-Oust
20. Saint-Perreux
21. Saint-Vincent-sur-Oust
22. Théhillac
23. Tréal
