= Eugène Guillevic =

French poet

Eugène Guillevic (Carnac, Morbihan, France, August 5, 1907 Carnac – March 19, 1997 Paris) (French pronunciation: [øʒɛn ɡijəvik]) was a French poet. Professionally, he went by the single name Guillevic.

== Life ==
He was born in the rocky landscape and marine environment of Brittany. His father, a sailor, was a policeman and took him to Jeumont (Nord) in 1909, Saint-Jean-Brévelay (Morbihan) in 1912, and Ferrette (Haut-Rhin) in 1919.

After a BA in mathematics, he was placed by the exams of 1926, in the Administration of Registration (Alsace, Ardennes). Appointed in 1935 to Paris as senior editor at the Directorate General at the Ministry of Finance and Economic Affairs, he was assigned in 1942 to control the economy. He was from 1945 to 1947 in the Cabinets of Ministers Francis Billoux (National Economy) and Charles Tillon (Reconstruction). In 1947 after the ouster of Communist ministers, he returned to the Inspector General of Economics, where his work included studies of the economy and planning, until his retirement in 1967.

He was a pre-war friend of Jean Follain, who introduced him to the group Sagesse; he later belonged to the School of Rochefort.

He was a practicing Catholic for about thirty years. He became a communist sympathizer during the Spanish Civil War, and in 1942 joined the Communist Party when he joined with Paul Éluard, and participated in the publications of the underground press (Pierre Seghers, Jean Lescure).

His poetry is concise, straightforward as rock, rough and generous, but still suggestive, relying on a "scrupulous simplicity of diction." His poetry is also characterized by its avoidance of metaphors, in that he prefers comparisons which he considered less misleading.

Guillevic collaborated often with artists to produce illustrated limited editions of his poetry, working with painters and printmakers including Julius Baltazar, Andre Beaudin, Jean Cortot, Olivier Debré, Bertrand Dorny, Jean Dubuffet, Fernand Léger, Alfred Manessier, and Patrice Pouperon.

He was married to Lucie Albertini Guillevic (b. May 31, 1935), a writer and translator of Scandinavian literature.

== Awards ==
- 1976 Grand Award for Poetry of the Académie française
- 1984 Grand National Prize for Poetry
- 1988 Prix Goncourt for poetry

== Works translated to English ==
- Geometries. Richard Sieburth (translator), Ugly Duckling Press, 2010.
- Art Poétique. Maureen Smith (translator), Black Widow Press/Commonwealth Books, Inc.,, 2009.
- The Sea & Other Poems. Patricia Terry (translator), Black Widow Press/Commonwealth Books, Inc., July 15, 2007, ISBN 978-0-9768449-8-3
- Carnac. John Montague (translator), Bloodaxe Books December 2000, ISBN 978-1-85224-393-7
- Living in Poetry: Interviews with Guillevic. Maureen Smith (translator), Dedalus, 1999.
- Euclideans. Teo Savory (translator), Unicorn Press, 1975.
- Selected Poems. Denise Levertov (translator), 1968, New Directions NDP279, Library of Congress Catalog Card Number 74-88726

== French works ==
- L'Expérience Guillevic (1923–1938, work documents published in 1994)
- Requiem (1938, six poems not published by the author)
- Terraqué, Gallimard, Paris, 1942.
- Elégies, with a lithography by Jean Dubuffet, Le Calligraphe, Paris 1946
- Fractures, Éditions de Minuit, collection L'Honneur des poètes, Paris 1947
- Exécutoire, Gallimard, Paris, 1947.
- Gagner, Gallimard, Paris, 1949.
- Terre à bonheur, Seghers, Paris, 1952; edition augmented by Envie de vivre, Seghers, Paris, 1985.
- 31 sonnets, preface by Aragon, Gallimard, Paris, 1954 (collection the author had not wanted re-issued)
- Carnac, Gallimard, Paris, 1961.
- Sphère, Gallimard, Paris, 1963.
- Avec, Gallimard, Paris, 1966.
- Euclidiennes, Gallimard, Paris, 1967.
- Ville, Gallimard, Paris, 1969.
- Paroi, Gallimard, Paris, 1970.
- Encoches, Editeurs français réunis, Paris, 1970.
- Inclus, Gallimard, Paris, 1973.
- Du domaine, Gallimard, Paris, 1977.
- Étier, poèmes 1965-1975, Gallimard, Paris, 1979.
- Autres, poèmes 1969-1979, Gallimard, Paris, 1980.
- Trouées, poèmes 1973-1980, Gallimard, Paris, 1981.
- Guitare, avec des bois en couleurs de Gérard Blanchet, Les Bibliophiles de France, 1982
- Requis, poèmes 1977-1982, Gallimard, Paris, 1983 (ISBN 2070267385).
- Timbres, Ecrits des Forges, Trois-Rivières, 1986 (ISBN 2890460983).
- Motifs, poèmes 1981-1984, Gallimard, Paris, 1987 (ISBN 2070711102).
- Creusement, poèmes 1977-1986, Gallimard, Paris, 1987 (ISBN 2070711099).
- Qui, L'Instant perpétuel, Rouen, 1987
- Art poétique, poème 1985-1986, Gallimard, Paris, 1989 (ISBN 2070717283).
- Le Chant, poème 1987-1988, Gallimard, Paris, 1990 (ISBN 207072123X).
- Impacts, Deyrolle Editeur, Cognac, 1990 (ISBN 2908487012).
- Maintenant, poème 1986-1992, Gallimard, Paris, 1993 (ISBN 2070733424).
- Possibles futurs, poèmes 1982-1994, Gallimard, Paris, 1996 (ISBN 2070745678).
- Proses ou Boire dans le secret des grottes, Fischbacher, Paris, 2001 (posthumous edition by Lucie Albertini-Guillevic and Jérôme Pellissier). (ISBN 9782717900262)
- Quotidiennes, poèmes 1994-1996, Gallimard, Paris, 2002.
- Présent, poèmes 1987-1997, Gallimard, Paris, 2004 (ISBN 2070770214)
- Pas si bêtes'!, Seghers Jeunesse, 2004, (ISBN 2232122530)
- Relier, poèmes 1938-1996, Gallimard, Paris, 2007 (posthumous edition by Lucie Albertini-Guillevic), 810 p. (ISBN 978-2-07-078514-8)
- Humour blanc et autres fabliettes, Seghers Jeunesse, 2008 (ISBN 9782232123016)

=== Republished paperback editions ===
- Terraqué, suivi d'Exécutoire, preface by Jacques Borel, 1968.
- Sphère suivi de Carnac, 1977.
- Du domaine suivi de Euclidiennes.
- Etier suivi de Autres, 1997 (ISBN 2070326284).
- Art poétique précédé de Paroi et suivi de Le Chant.
- Possibles futurs, 2007.
