= Buléon =

Commune in Brittany, France

Buléon Buelion
- Commune
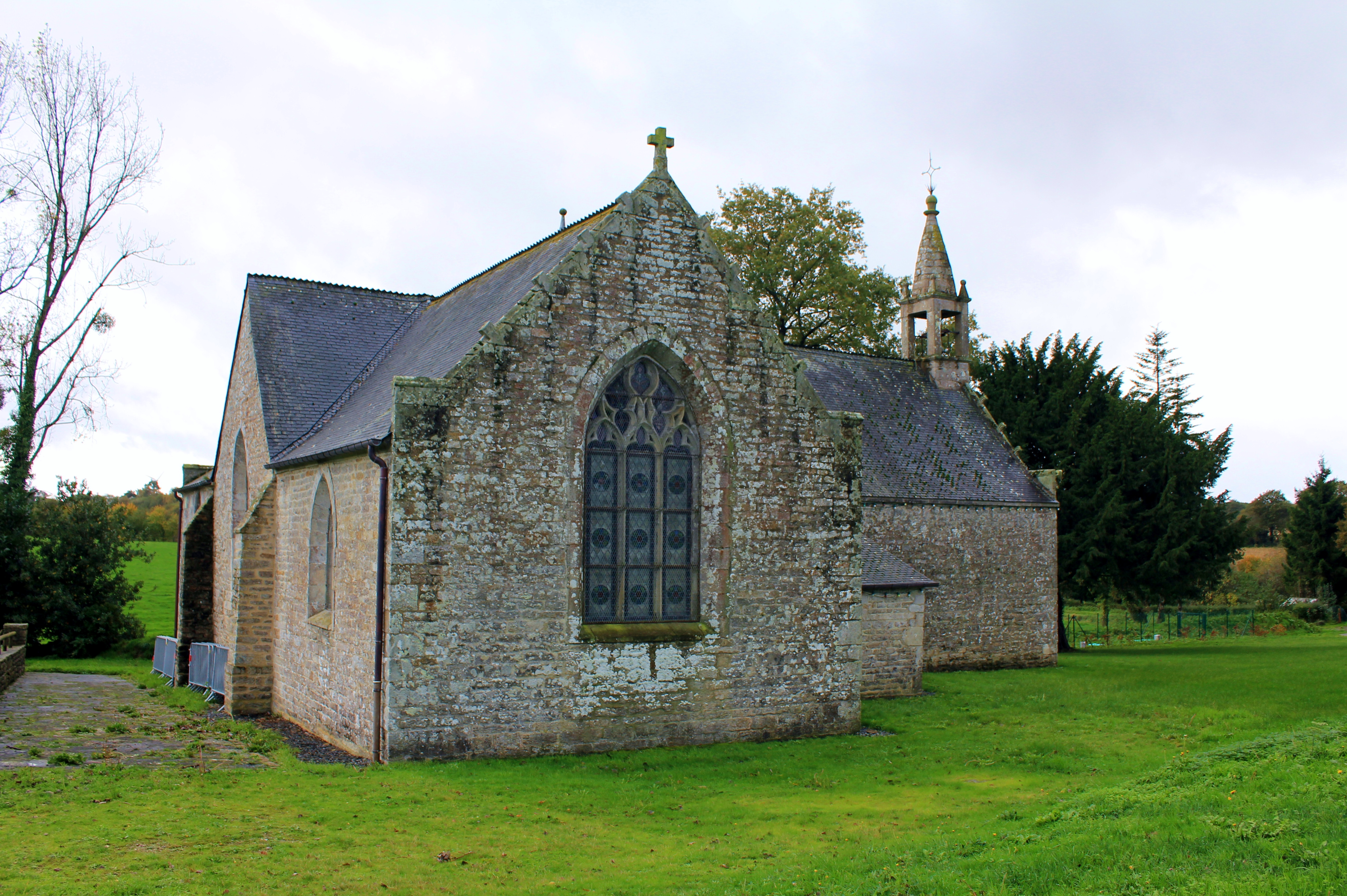
- The chapel of Sainte-Anne, in Buléon

- Coat of arms
- Location of Buléon
- Location within France Location within Brittany
- Coordinates: 47°56′08″N 2°40′32″W
- Country: France
- Region: Brittany
- Department: Morbihan
- Arrondissement: Pontivy
- Canton: Moréac
- Intercommunality: Centre Morbihan Communauté

Government
  - Mayor (2026–32): Pierre Bouédo
- Area^{1}: 12.27 km^{2} (4.74 sq mi)
- Highest elevation: 149 m (489 ft)
- Lowest elevation: 89 m (292 ft)
- Population (2023): 547
  - Density: 44.6/km^{2} (115/sq mi)
- Time zone: UTC+01:00 (CET)
  - Summer (DST): UTC+02:00 (CEST)
- INSEE/Postal code: 56027 /56420
- ^{1} French Land Register data, which excludes lakes, ponds, glaciers > 1 km^{2} (0.386 sq mi or 247 acres) and river estuaries.

Buléon (French pronunciation: [byleɔ̃]; Breton: Buelion) is a commune in the Morbihan department of Brittany in northwestern France.

== Population ==
Inhabitants of Buléon are called in French Buléonais.

== See also ==
- Communes of the Morbihan department
