= Missiriac =

Missiriac Megerieg
- Commune
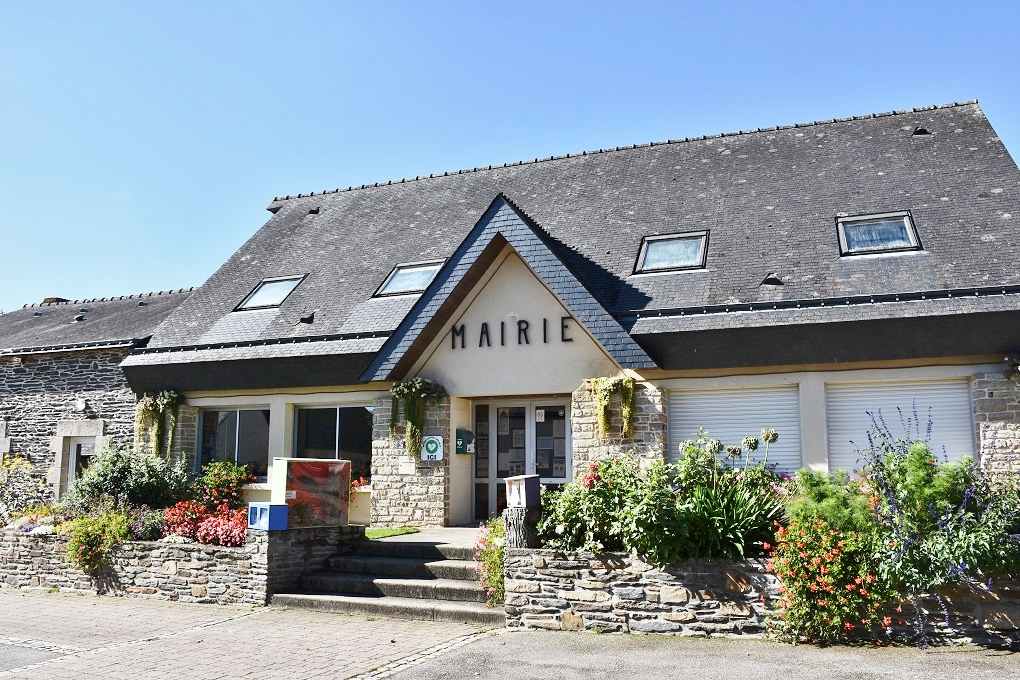
- Town hall
- Location of Missiriac
- Location within France Location within Brittany
- Coordinates: 47°50′12″N 2°20′58″W
- Country: France
- Region: Brittany
- Department: Morbihan
- Arrondissement: Vannes
- Canton: Moréac
- Intercommunality: CC de l'Oust à Brocéliande

Government
  - Mayor (2026–32): Christelle Marcy
- Area^{1}: 13.47 km^{2} (5.20 sq mi)
- Highest elevation: 96 m (315 ft)
- Lowest elevation: 9 m (30 ft)
- Population (2023): 1,195
  - Density: 88.72/km^{2} (229.8/sq mi)
- Time zone: UTC+01:00 (CET)
  - Summer (DST): UTC+02:00 (CEST)
- INSEE/Postal code: 56133 /56140
- ^{1} French Land Register data, which excludes lakes, ponds, glaciers > 1 km^{2} (0.386 sq mi or 247 acres) and river estuaries.

Missiriac (French pronunciation: [misiʁjak]; Breton: Megerieg) is a commune in the Morbihan department of Brittany in north-western France. Inhabitants of Missiriac are called in French Missiriacois.

== See also ==
- Communes of the Morbihan department
