= Pleucadeuc =

Pleucadeuc Plegadeg
- Commune
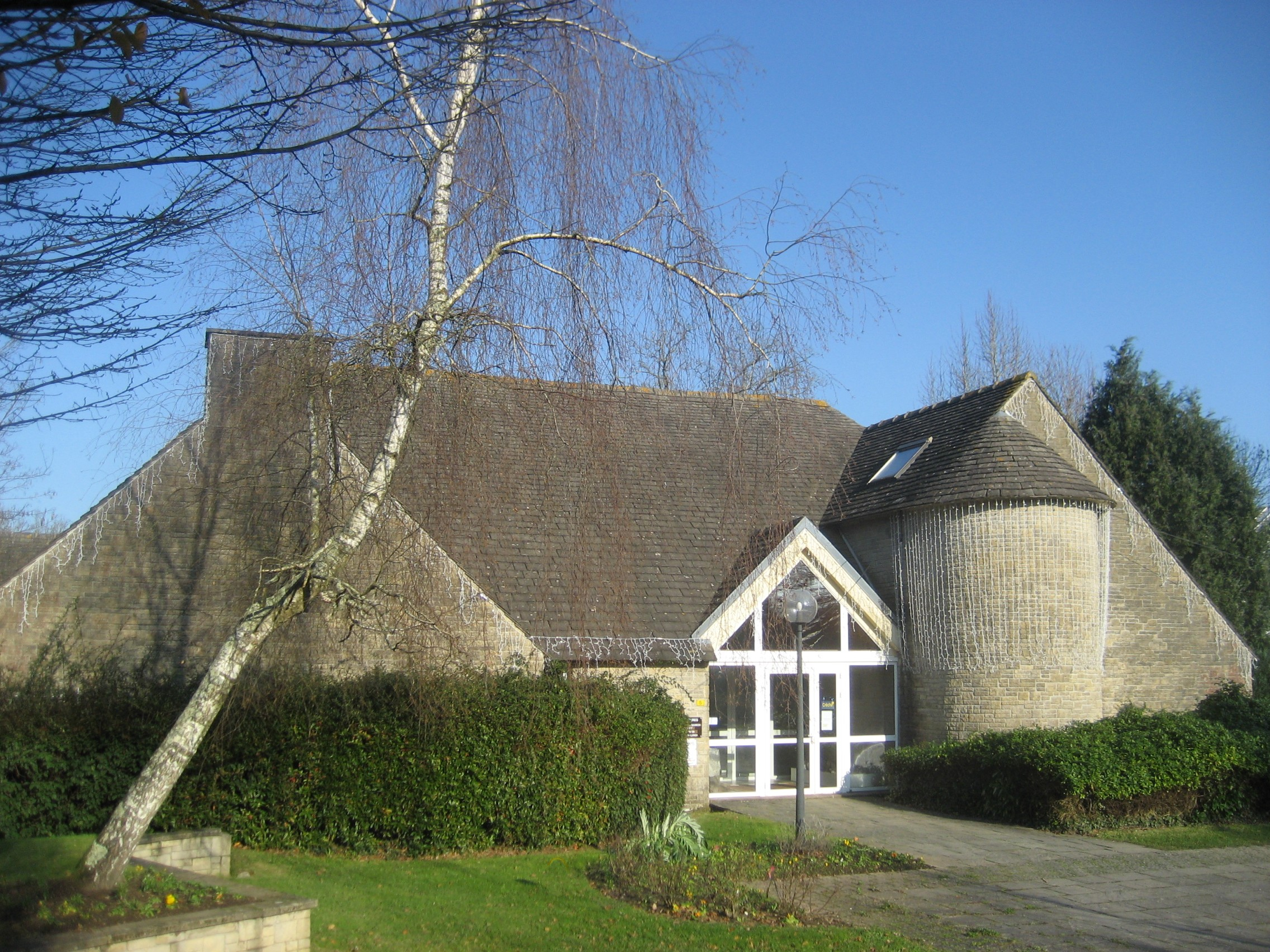
- The town hall in Pleucadeuc

- Coat of arms
- Location of Pleucadeuc
- Location within France Location within Brittany
- Coordinates: 47°45′35″N 2°22′29″W
- Country: France
- Region: Brittany
- Department: Morbihan
- Arrondissement: Vannes
- Canton: Moréac

Government
  - Mayor (2026–32): Loïc Balac
- Area^{1}: 34.56 km^{2} (13.34 sq mi)
- Highest elevation: 99 m (325 ft)
- Lowest elevation: 7 m (23 ft)
- Population (2023): 1,866
  - Density: 53.99/km^{2} (139.8/sq mi)
- Time zone: UTC+01:00 (CET)
  - Summer (DST): UTC+02:00 (CEST)
- INSEE/Postal code: 56159 /56140
- ^{1} French Land Register data, which excludes lakes, ponds, glaciers > 1 km^{2} (0.386 sq mi or 247 acres) and river estuaries.

Pleucadeuc (French pronunciation: [pløkadœk]; Breton: Plegadeg) is a commune in the Morbihan department of Brittany in north-western France.

The name comes from the Breton word Plou and the name Cadoc, a Breton saint, meaning Parish of Cadoc. Numerous megaliths are to be found around the commune.

== Demographics ==
Inhabitants of Pleucadeuc are called in French Pleucadeuciens.

Historical population
Year	Pop.	±% p.a.
1968	1,181	—
1975	1,158	−0.28%
1982	1,331	+2.01%
1990	1,376	+0.42%
1999	1,482	+0.83%
2007	1,747	+2.08%
2012	1,754	+0.08%
2017	1,804	+0.56%
2023	1,866	+0.56%
Source: INSEE

== Geography ==
Pleucadeuc is located in the natural region of the Landes de Lanvaux, 19 km (12 mi) south of Ploërmel, 31 km (19 mi) northeast of Vannes and 74 km (46 mi) west of Rennes.

== Map ==
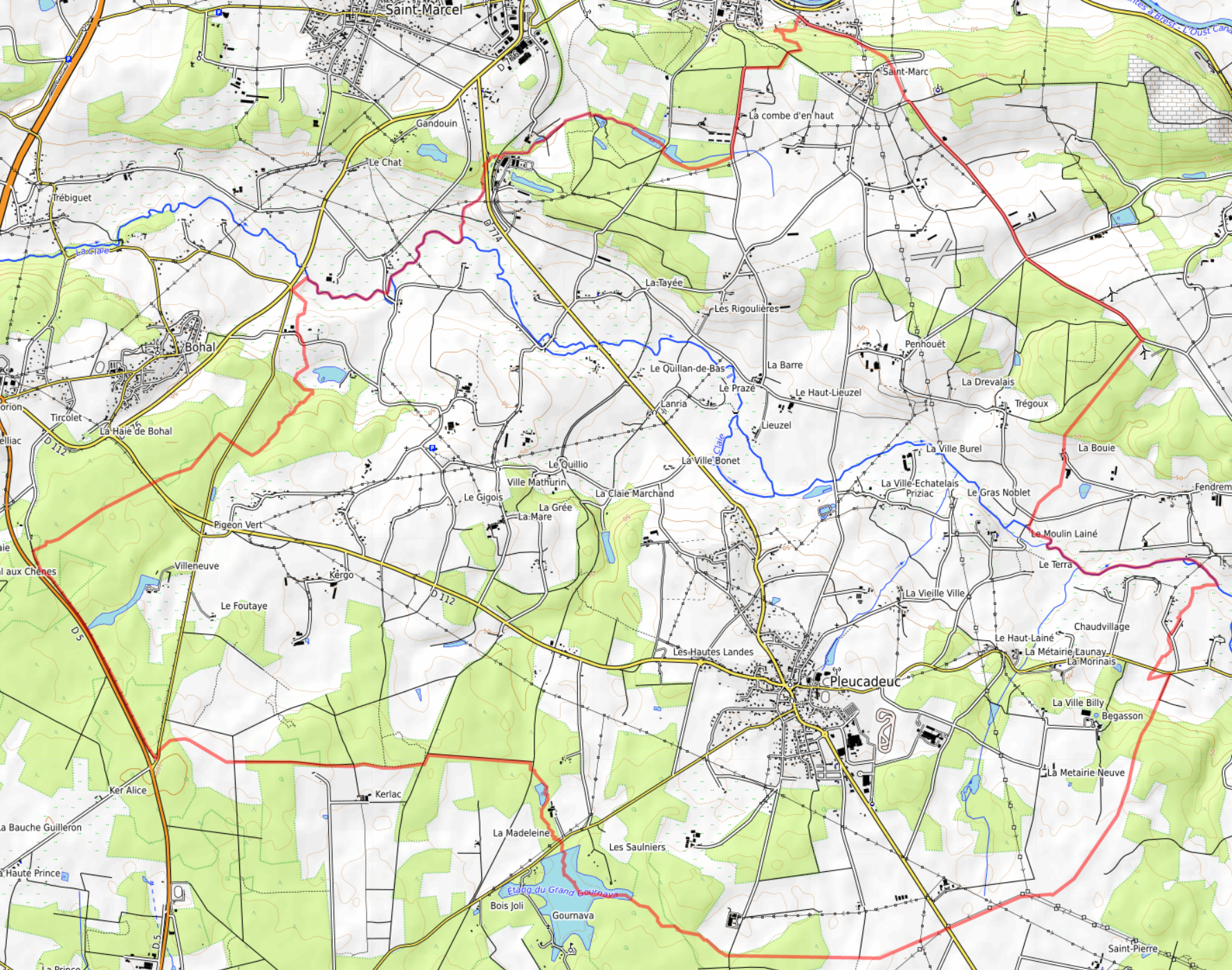
Topographic map

== Event ==
Pleucadeuc holds an annual festival on 15 August for pairs of twins and multiples called rassemblement "Deux et plus" ("the Two and more gathering"). This festival started in 1994 and has become France's largest annual gathering of twins, with approximately 1,000 sets attending each year, and one of the largest such events in Europe.

== See also ==
- Communes of the Morbihan department
