= Saint-Abraham =

Saint-Abraham Sant-Abran
- Commune
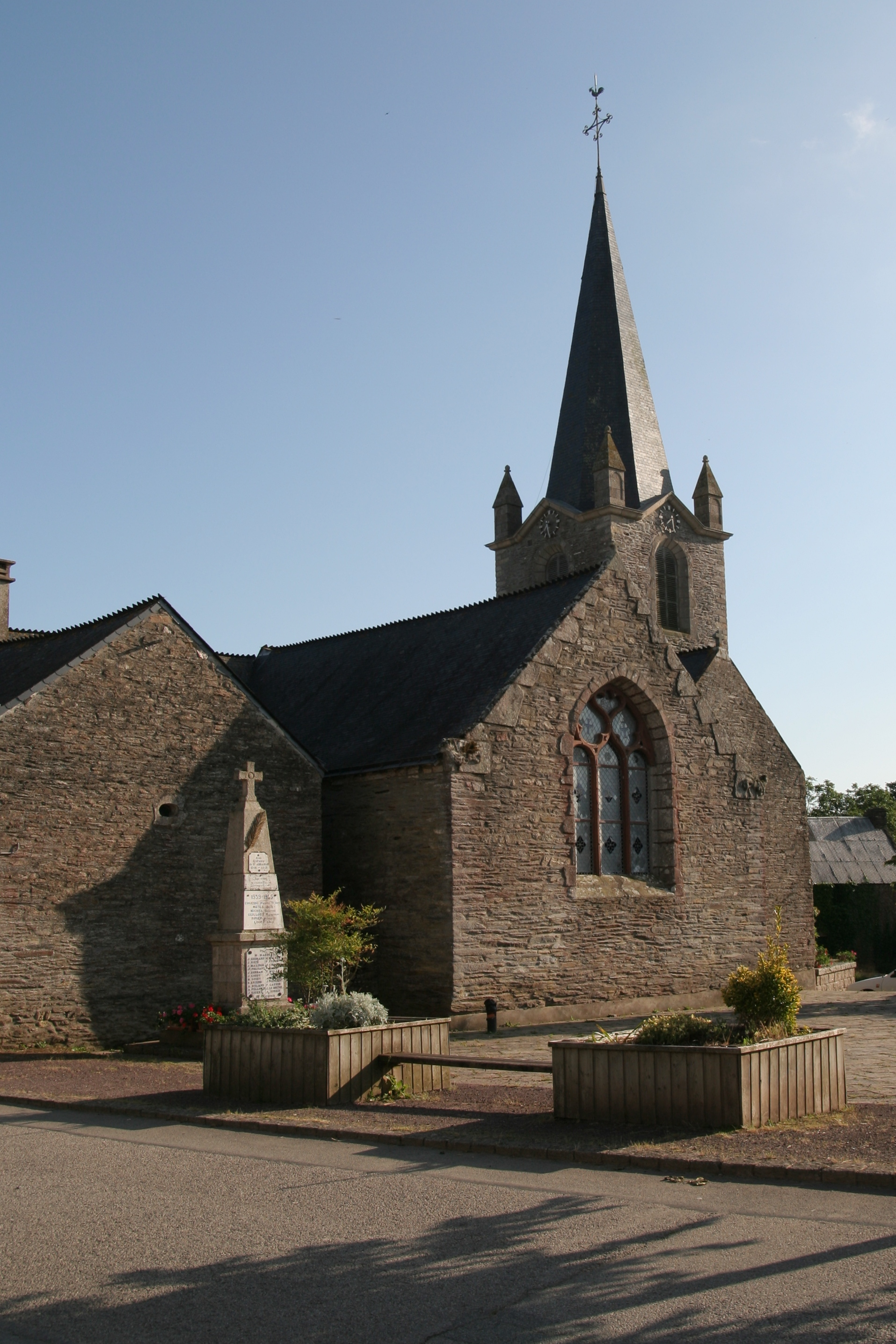
- The church of Saint-Étienne, in Saint-Abraham
- Location of Saint-Abraham
- Location within France Location within Brittany
- Coordinates: 47°51′24″N 2°24′31″W
- Country: France
- Region: Brittany
- Department: Morbihan
- Arrondissement: Vannes
- Canton: Moréac
- Intercommunality: CC de l'Oust à Brocéliande

Government
  - Mayor (2026–32): Gaëlle Stricot
- Area^{1}: 6.72 km^{2} (2.59 sq mi)
- Highest elevation: 87 m (285 ft)
- Lowest elevation: 15 m (49 ft)
- Population (2023): 552
  - Density: 82.1/km^{2} (213/sq mi)
- Time zone: UTC+01:00 (CET)
  - Summer (DST): UTC+02:00 (CEST)
- INSEE/Postal code: 56202 /56140
- ^{1} French Land Register data, which excludes lakes, ponds, glaciers > 1 km^{2} (0.386 sq mi or 247 acres) and river estuaries.

Saint-Abraham (French pronunciation: [sɛ̃.t‿abʁa.am]; Breton: Sant-Abran) is a commune in the Morbihan department of Brittany in north-western France.

== See also ==
- Communes of the Morbihan department
