= Communes of the Morbihan department =

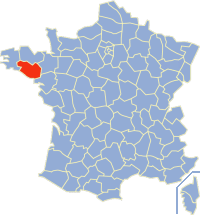

The following is a list of the 249 communes of the Morbihan department of France.

The communes cooperate in the following intercommunalities (as of 2025):

- CA Golfe du Morbihan - Vannes Agglomération
- CA Lorient Agglomération
- Communauté d'agglomération de la Presqu'île de Guérande Atlantique (partly)
- CA Redon Agglomération (partly)
- Communauté de communes Arc Sud Bretagne
- Communauté de communes Auray Quiberon Terre Atlantique
- CC Baud Communauté
- Communauté de communes de Belle-Île-en-Mer
- Communauté de communes de Blavet Bellevue Océan
- CC Centre Morbihan Communauté
- Communauté de communes de l'Oust à Brocéliande
- CC Ploërmel Communauté
- CC Pontivy Communauté (partly)
- CC Questembert Communauté
- CC Roi Morvan Communauté

INSEE code	Postal code	Commune
56001	56350	Allaire
56002	56190	Ambon
56003	56610	Arradon
56004	56190	Arzal
56005	56640	Arzon
56006	56800	Augan
56007	56400	Auray
56008	56870	Baden
56009	56360	Bangor
56010	56150	Baud
56011	56350	Béganne
56012	56380	Beignon
56013	56550	Belz
56014	56240	Berné
56015	56230	Berric
56017	56500	Bignan
56018	56190	Billiers
56019	56420	Billio
56020	56140	Bohal
56262	56400	Bono
56021	56700	Brandérion
56022	56390	Brandivy
56023	56400	Brech
56024	56580	Bréhan
56025	56430	Brignac
56026	56310	Bubry
56027	56420	Buléon
56028	56220	Caden
56029	56240	Calan
56030	56130	Camoël
56031	56330	Camors
56032	56800	Campénéac
56033	56910	Carentoir
56034	56340	Carnac
56035	56140	Caro
56036	56850	Caudan
56039	56500	La Chapelle-Neuve
56040	56620	Cléguer
56041	56480	Cléguérec
56042	56390	Colpo
56043	56430	Concoret
56044	56200	Cournon
56045	56230	Le Cours
56046	56950	Crac'h
56047	56580	Crédin
56048	56540	Le Croisty
56050	56120	La Croix-Helléan
56051	56420	Cruguel
56052	56750	Damgan
56053	56250	Elven
56054	56410	Erdeven
56055	56410	Étel
56144	56500	Évellys
56056	56490	Évriguet
56057	56320	Le Faouët
56058	56130	Férel
56102	56120	Forges de Lanouée
56060	56200	Les Fougerêts
56061	56200	La Gacilly
56062	56680	Gâvres
56063	56530	Gestel
56065	56800	Gourhel
56066	56110	Gourin
56067	56390	Grand-Champ
56068	56120	La Grée-Saint-Laurent
56069	56590	Groix
56070	56120	Guégon
56071	56420	Guéhenno
56072	56920	Gueltas
56073	56160	Guémené-sur-Scorff
56074	56150	Guénin
56075	56380	Guer
56076	56310	Guern
56077	56190	Le Guerno
56078	56520	Guidel
56079	56800	Guillac
56080	56490	Guilliers
56081	56560	Guiscriff
56082	56120	Helléan
56083	56700	Hennebont
56084	56450	Le Hézo
56085	56170	Hœdic
56087	56780	Île-aux-Moines
56088	56840	Île-d'Arz
56086	56170	Île-d'Houat
56089	56240	Inguiniel
56090	56650	Inzinzac-Lochrist
56091	56120	Josselin
56092	56920	Kerfourn
56093	56300	Kergrist
56264	56540	Kernascléden
56094	56700	Kervignac
56096	56690	Landaul
56097	56690	Landévant
56098	56600	Lanester
56099	56160	Langoëlan
56100	56630	Langonnet
56101	56440	Languidic
56103	56120	Lantillac
56104	56240	Lanvaudan
56105	56320	Lanvénégen
56106	56870	Larmor-Baden
56107	56260	Larmor-Plage
56108	56230	Larré
56109	56190	Lauzach
56110	56160	Lignol
56111	56220	Limerzel
56112	56460	Lizio
56113	56160	Locmalo
56114	56360	Locmaria
56115	56390	Locmaria-Grand-Champ
56116	56740	Locmariaquer
56117	56500	Locminé
56118	56570	Locmiquélic
56119	56550	Locoal-Mendon
56120	56390	Locqueltas
56121	56100	Lorient
56122	56800	Loyat
56123	56220	Malansac
56124	56140	Malestroit
56125	56300	Malguénac
56126	56130	Marzan
56127	56430	Mauron
56128	56310	Melrand
56129	56490	Ménéac
56130	56700	Merlevenez

INSEE code	Postal code	Commune
56131	56320	Meslan
56132	56890	Meucon
56133	56140	Missiriac
56134	56490	Mohon
56135	56230	Molac
56136	56380	Monteneuf
56137	56250	Monterblanc
56139	56800	Montertelot
56140	56500	Moréac
56141	56500	Moustoir-Ac
56143	56190	Muzillac
56145	56430	Néant-sur-Yvel
56146	56300	Neulliac
56147	56130	Nivillac
56148	56690	Nostang
56149	56190	Noyal-Muzillac
56151	56920	Noyal-Pontivy
56152	56360	Le Palais
56153	56130	Péaule
56154	56220	Peillac
56155	56760	Pénestin
56156	56160	Persquen
56157	56420	Plaudren
56158	56890	Plescop
56159	56140	Pleucadeuc
56160	56120	Pleugriffet
56161	56400	Ploemel
56162	56270	Ploemeur
56163	56160	Ploërdut
56164	56880	Ploeren
56165	56800	Ploërmel
56166	56240	Plouay
56167	56400	Plougoumelen
56168	56340	Plouharnel
56169	56680	Plouhinec
56170	56770	Plouray
56171	56220	Pluherlin
56172	56420	Plumelec
56173	56930	Pluméliau-Bieuzy
56174	56500	Plumelin
56175	56400	Plumergat
56176	56400	Pluneret
56177	56330	Pluvigner
56178	56300	Pontivy
56179	56620	Pont-Scorff
56180	56380	Porcaro
56181	56290	Port-Louis
56182	56320	Priziac
56184	56230	Questembert
56185	56530	Quéven
56186	56170	Quiberon
56188	56310	Quistinic
56189	56500	Radenac
56190	56500	Réguiny
56191	56140	Réminiac
56193	56670	Riantec
56194	56350	Rieux
56195	56130	La Roche-Bernard
56196	56220	Rochefort-en-Terre
56198	56580	Rohan
56199	56110	Roudouallec
56200	56140	Ruffiac
56201	56110	Le Saint
56202	56140	Saint-Abraham
56203	56480	Saint-Aignan
56204	56500	Saint-Allouestre
56205	56450	Saint-Armel
56206	56890	Saint-Avé
56207	56150	Saint-Barthélemy
56208	56430	Saint-Brieuc-de-Mauron
56210	56540	Saint-Caradec-Trégomel
56211	56140	Saint-Congard
56212	56130	Saint-Dolay
56263	56400	Sainte-Anne-d'Auray
56209	56480	Sainte-Brigitte
56220	56700	Sainte-Hélène
56213	56920	Saint-Gérand-Croixanvec
56214	56730	Saint-Gildas-de-Rhuys
56215	56920	Saint-Gonnery
56216	56350	Saint-Gorgon
56218	56220	Saint-Gravé
56219	56460	Saint-Guyomard
56221	56220	Saint-Jacut-les-Pins
56222	56660	Saint-Jean-Brévelay
56223	56350	Saint-Jean-la-Poterie
56224	56140	Saint-Laurent-sur-Oust
56225	56430	Saint-Léry
56226	56380	Saint-Malo-de-Beignon
56227	56490	Saint-Malo-des-Trois-Fontaines
56228	56140	Saint-Marcel
56229	56200	Saint-Martin-sur-Oust
56230	56910	Saint-Nicolas-du-Tertre
56231	56250	Saint-Nolff
56232	56350	Saint-Perreux
56233	56470	Saint-Philibert
56234	56510	Saint-Pierre-Quiberon
56236	56120	Saint-Servant
56237	56300	Saint-Thuriau
56238	56540	Saint-Tugdual
56239	56350	Saint-Vincent-sur-Oust
56240	56370	Sarzeau
56241	56360	Sauzon
56242	56160	Séglien
56243	56860	Séné
56244	56460	Sérent
56245	56480	Silfiac
56246	56300	Le Sourn
56247	56250	Sulniac
56248	56450	Surzur
56249	56800	Taupont
56250	56130	Théhillac
56251	56450	Theix-Noyalo
56252	56370	Le Tour-du-Parc
56253	56140	Tréal
56254	56250	Trédion
56255	56250	Treffléan
56256	56430	Tréhorenteuc
56257	56490	La Trinité-Porhoët
56258	56470	La Trinité-sur-Mer
56259	56190	La Trinité-Surzur
56197	56460	Val d'Oust
56260	56000	Vannes
56261	56250	La Vraie-Croix
