= Le Saint =

Le Saint Ar Sent
- Commune
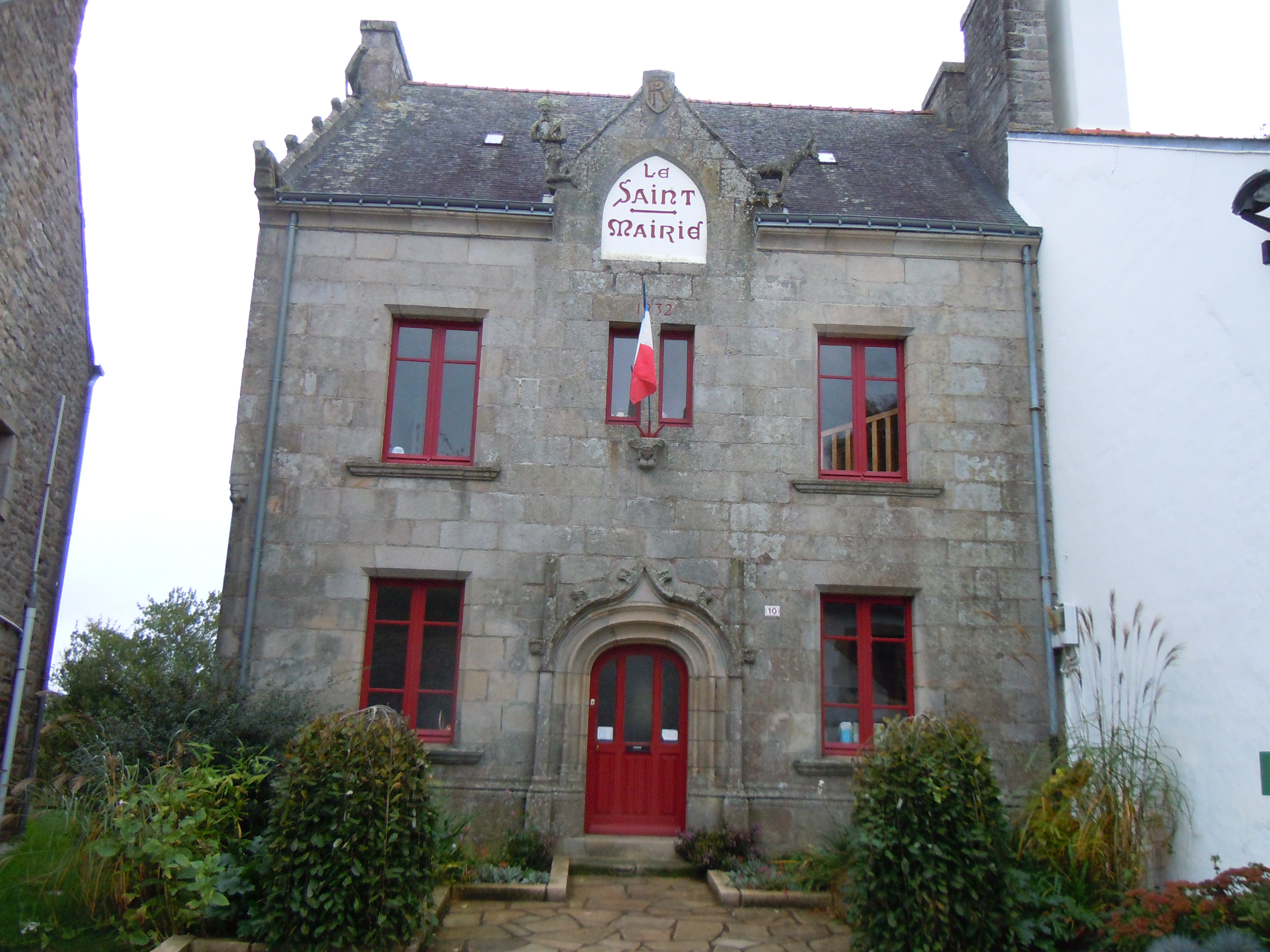
- The town hall in Le Saint

- Coat of arms
- Location of Le Saint
- Location within France Location within Brittany
- Coordinates: 48°05′25″N 3°33′40″W
- Country: France
- Region: Brittany
- Department: Morbihan
- Arrondissement: Pontivy
- Canton: Gourin
- Intercommunality: Roi Morvan Communauté

Government
  - Mayor (2026–32): Natacha Sannier
- Area^{1}: 31.03 km^{2} (11.98 sq mi)
- Highest elevation: 223 m (732 ft)
- Lowest elevation: 73 m (240 ft)
- Population (2023): 612
  - Density: 19.7/km^{2} (51.1/sq mi)
- Time zone: UTC+01:00 (CET)
  - Summer (DST): UTC+02:00 (CEST)
- INSEE/Postal code: 56201 /56110
- ^{1} French Land Register data, which excludes lakes, ponds, glaciers > 1 km^{2} (0.386 sq mi or 247 acres) and river estuaries.

Le Saint (French pronunciation: [lə sɛ̃]; Breton: Ar Sent) is a commune in the Morbihan department of Brittany in north-western France.

== Breton language ==
The municipality launched a Breton linguistic plan through Ya d'ar brezhoneg on 24 February 2005.

== Population ==
The population has been divided by three since the first world war.

Historical population

Year	Pop.	±% p.a.
1793	1,644	—
1800	1,633	−0.10%
1806	1,378	−2.79%
1821	1,220	−0.81%
1831	1,458	+1.80%
1836	1,487	+0.39%
1841	1,630	+1.85%
1846	1,704	+0.89%
1851	1,627	−0.92%
1856	1,582	−0.56%
1861	1,646	+0.80%
1866	1,679	+0.40%
1872	1,609	−0.71%
1876	1,639	+0.46%
1881	1,753	+1.35%
1886	1,782	+0.33%
1891	1,804	+0.25%
1896	1,820	+0.18%
1901	1,962	+1.51%

Year	Pop.	±% p.a.
1906	2,055	+0.93%
1911	2,159	+0.99%
1921	2,068	−0.43%
1926	2,088	+0.19%
1931	2,035	−0.51%
1936	1,967	−0.68%
1946	1,800	−0.88%
1954	1,513	−2.15%
1962	1,354	−1.38%
1968	1,208	−1.88%
1975	1,013	−2.48%
1982	881	−1.97%
1990	761	−1.81%
1999	696	−0.99%
2007	668	−0.51%
2012	617	−1.58%
2017	587	−0.99%
2023	612	+0.70%

Source: EHESS and INSEE (1968-2023)

== Geography ==
Le Saint is located in the northwestern part of Morbihan, 40 km (25 mi) north of Lorient. Historically, it belongs to Cornouaille. Le Saint is border by Gourin to the west and the north, by Langonnet and Le Faouët to the east and by Guiscriff to the south. The river Inam forms the commune's western border and the river Moulin du Duc forms the commune's eastern border. The two rivers meet at the southern end of the commune at a place called Pont Briand. Apart from the village centre there are about eighty hamlets.

== Map ==
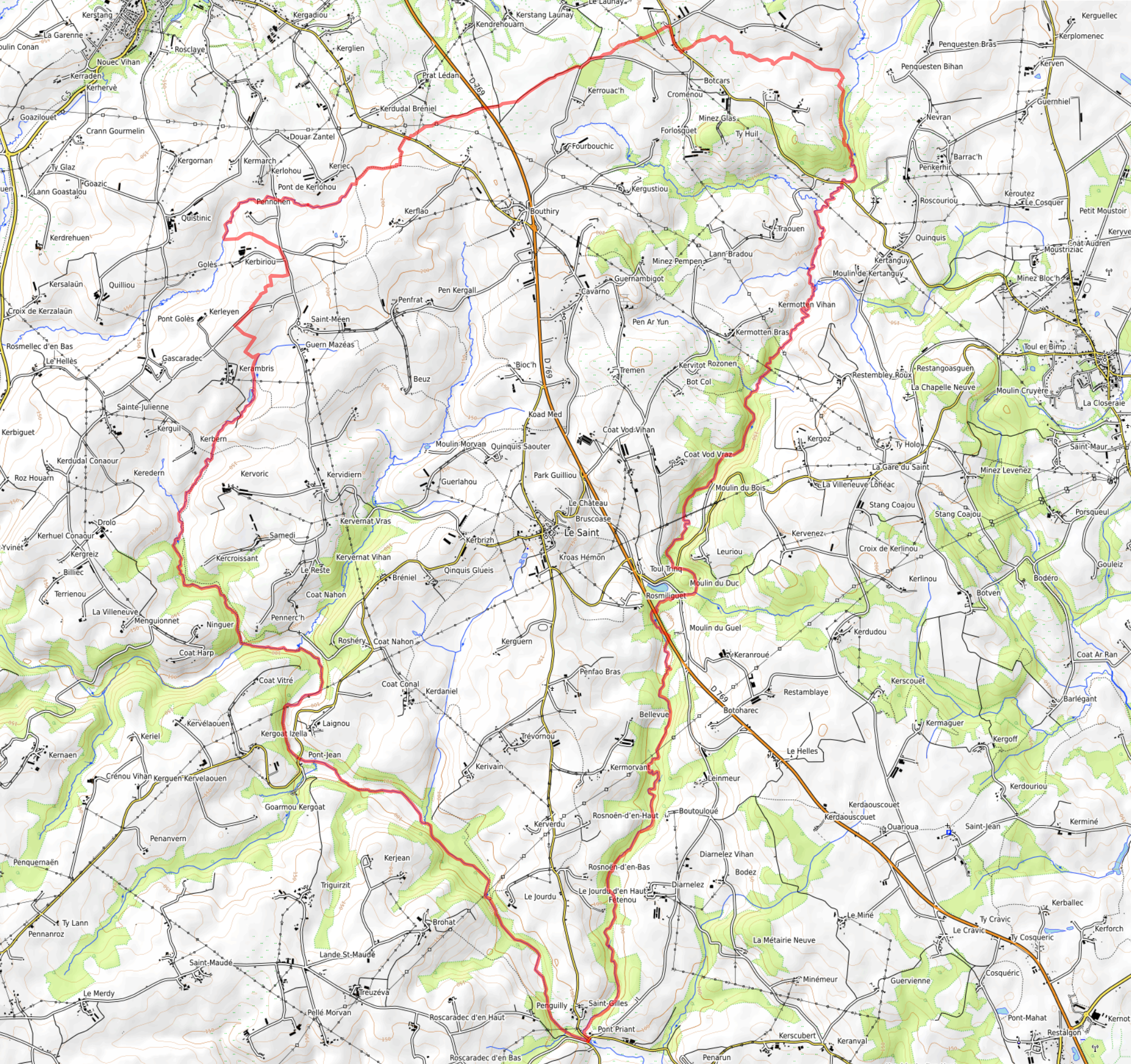
Topographic map.

== List of places ==
- Banalou
- Bas Bourg
- Bellevue
- Beuze
- Bioche
- Botcars
- Botcol
- Bouthiry
- Bréniel
- Cavarno
- Le Château
- Coat Bras
- Coat Conal
- Coat Med
- Coat Naon
- Coat Vod Vras
- Coat Vod Vihan
- Coat Zent
- Cromennou
- Feuteunou
- Forlosquet
- Fourbouchic
- Garzenleuriou
- Goasquellec
- Goslein
- Guerlaou
- Guernambigot
- Guernmazias
- Jourdu, le
- Keranna
- Kerbris
- Kercroissin
- Kerdaniel
- Kerendrec'h
- Kerflao
- Kerguern
- Kergustiou
- Kerivin
- Kerlouis
- Kermeur
- Kermonten Vihan
- Kermonten Vras
- Kermorvan
- Kernanuel
- Kernévez
- Kernine
- Kerrouarc'h
- Kersamuel
- Kerverdus
- Kervernat Vihan
- Kervernat Vras
- Kervidiern
- Kervitot
- Kervoric
- Lan Bradou
- Leignona
- Leignou
- Métairie du bois
- Minez glaz
- Minez Land
- Minez Pempen
- Moulin du Duc
- Moulin Coz
- Moulin du Jourdu
- Moulin Morvan
- Parc Guillou
- Pen Hen
- Penanros
- Penfao
- Penher
- Penkergal
- Penneyune
- Pennohen
- Pouleriguen
- Quinquis Gleiz
- Quinquis Saouter
- Reste, le
- Roshery
- Rosmiliguet
- Rosnoën
- Rozonen
- Saint Gilles
- Saint Méen
- Saint Trémeur
- Sainte Jeanne
- Samedy, le
- Stang er Len
- Stang er Vel
- Stangala
- Toultrinc
- Toultoussec
- Traouen
- Tremen
- Trévarnou
- Ty Huil

== History ==
The lords of Faouët, the Bouteville, lived in their castle in Le Saint in the fifteenth century.

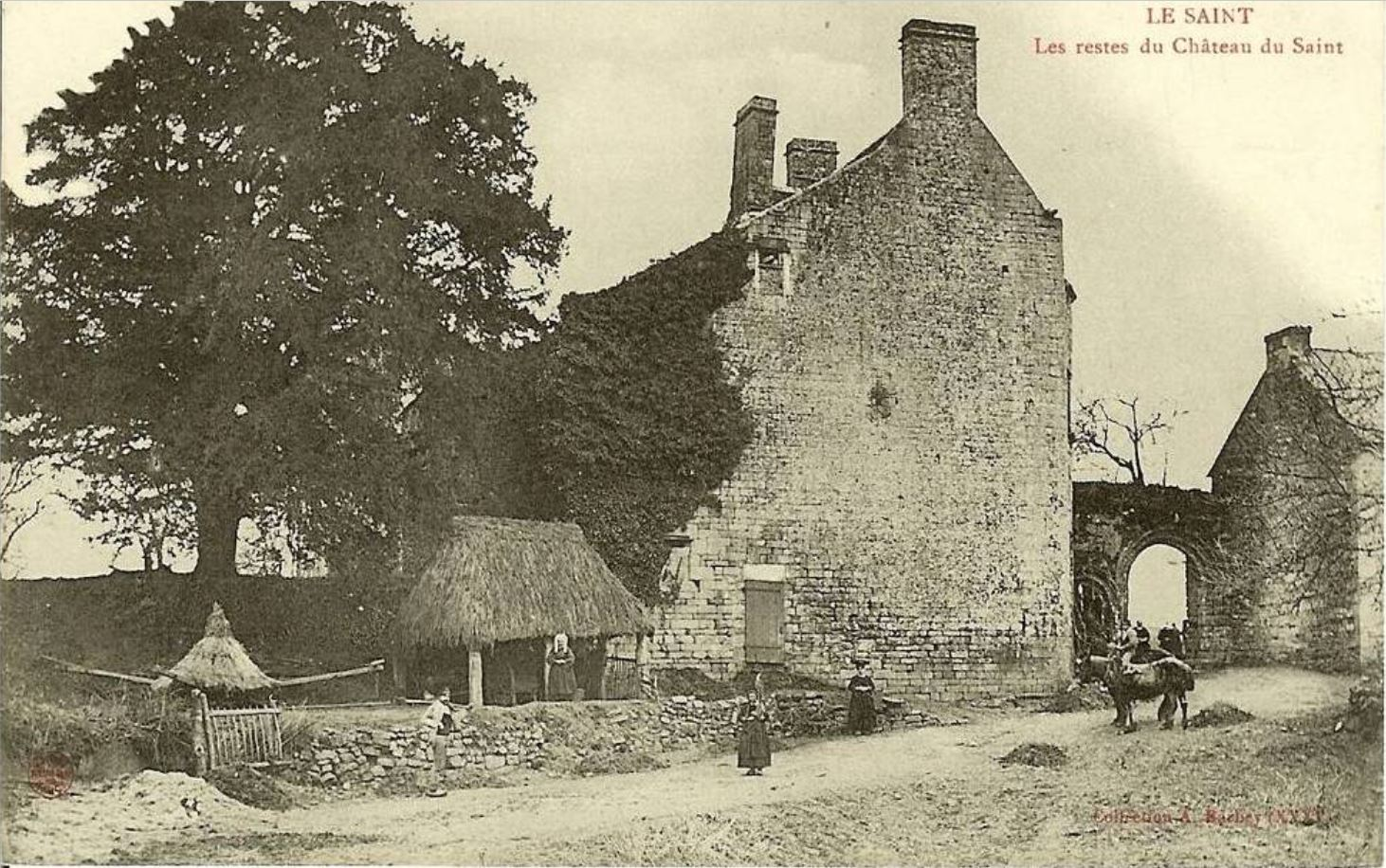
The ruins of the castle at the beginning of the twentieth century.

== Gallery ==
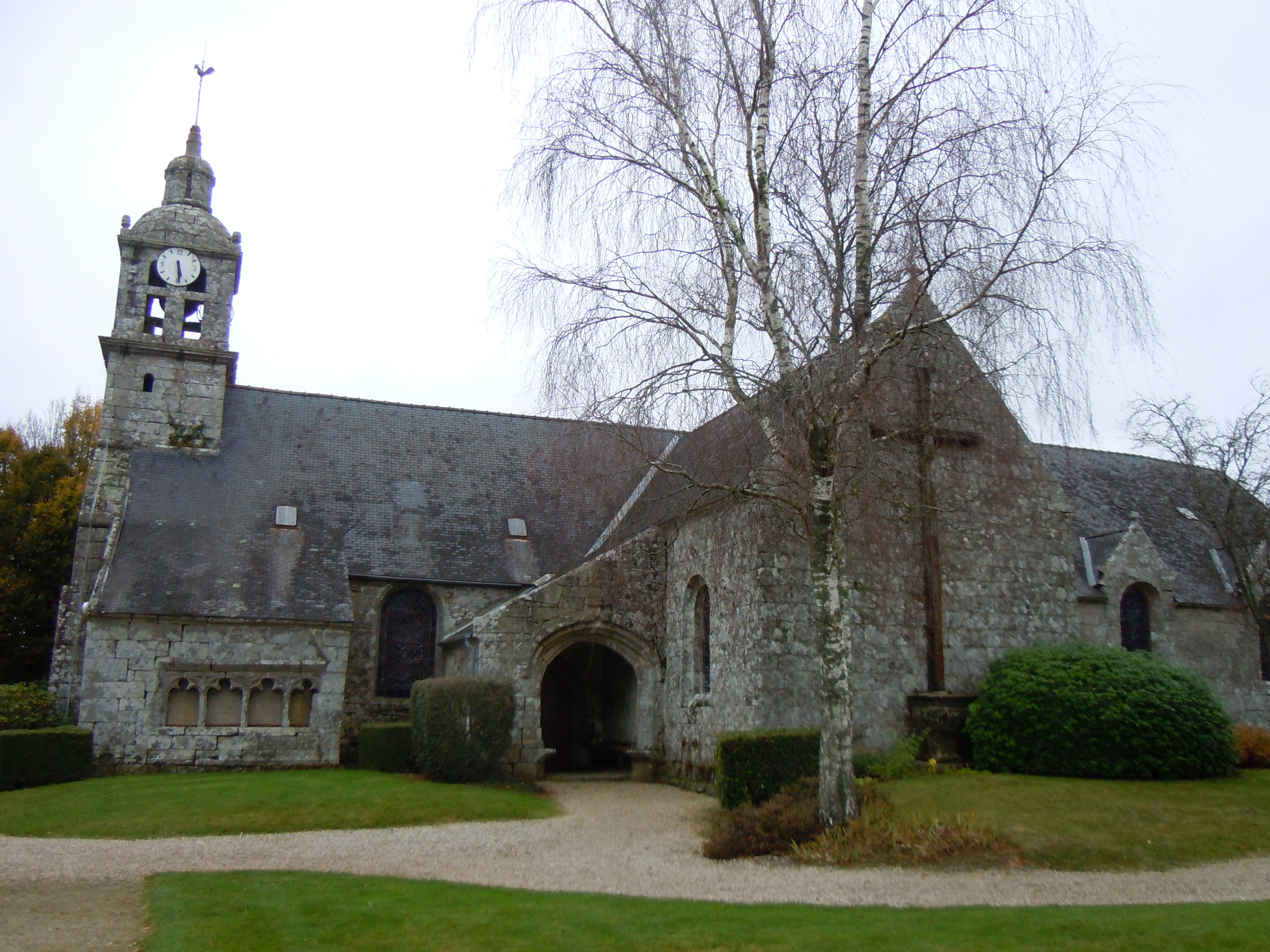
The church.

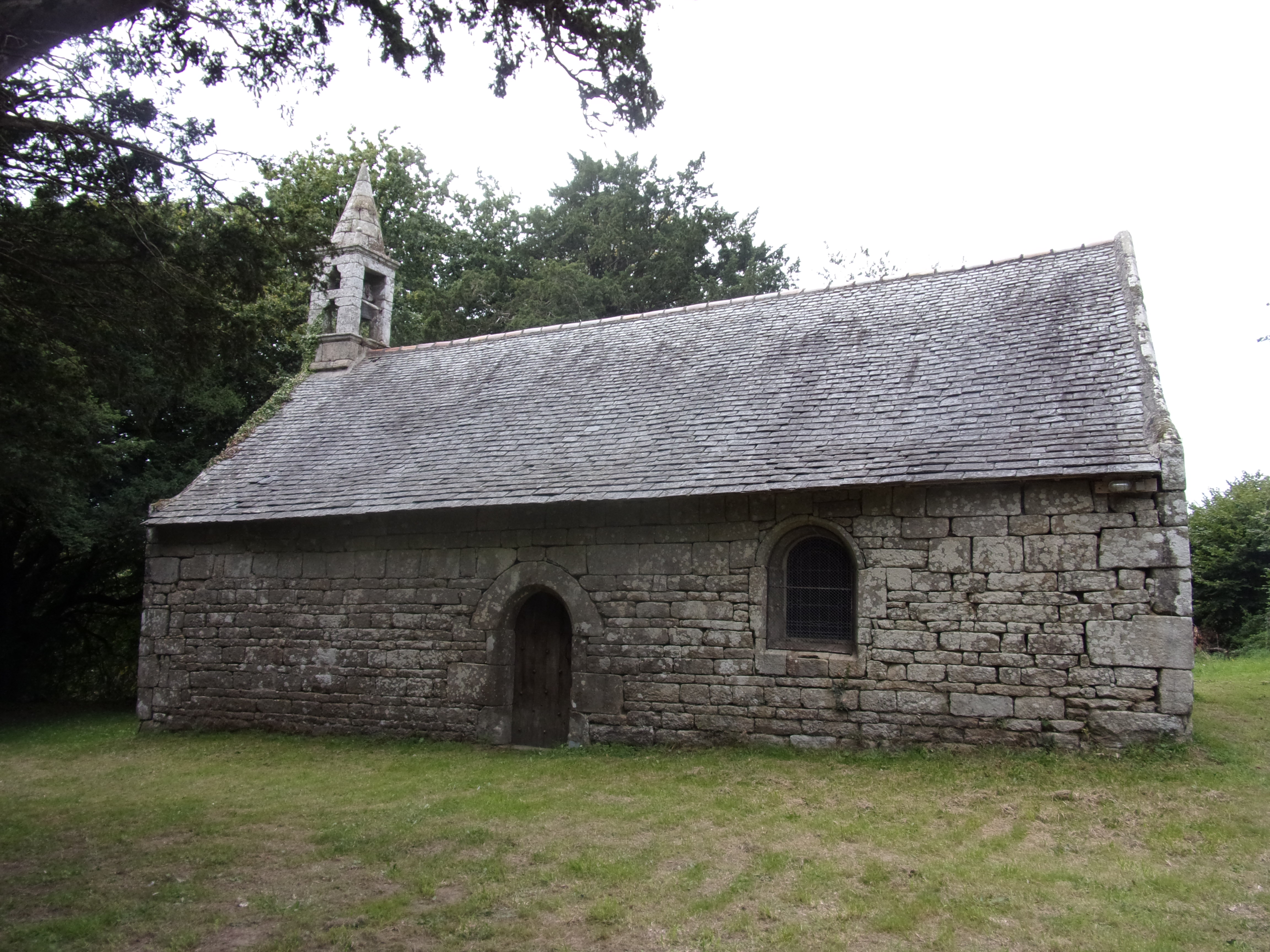
The chapel of Saint-Méen.

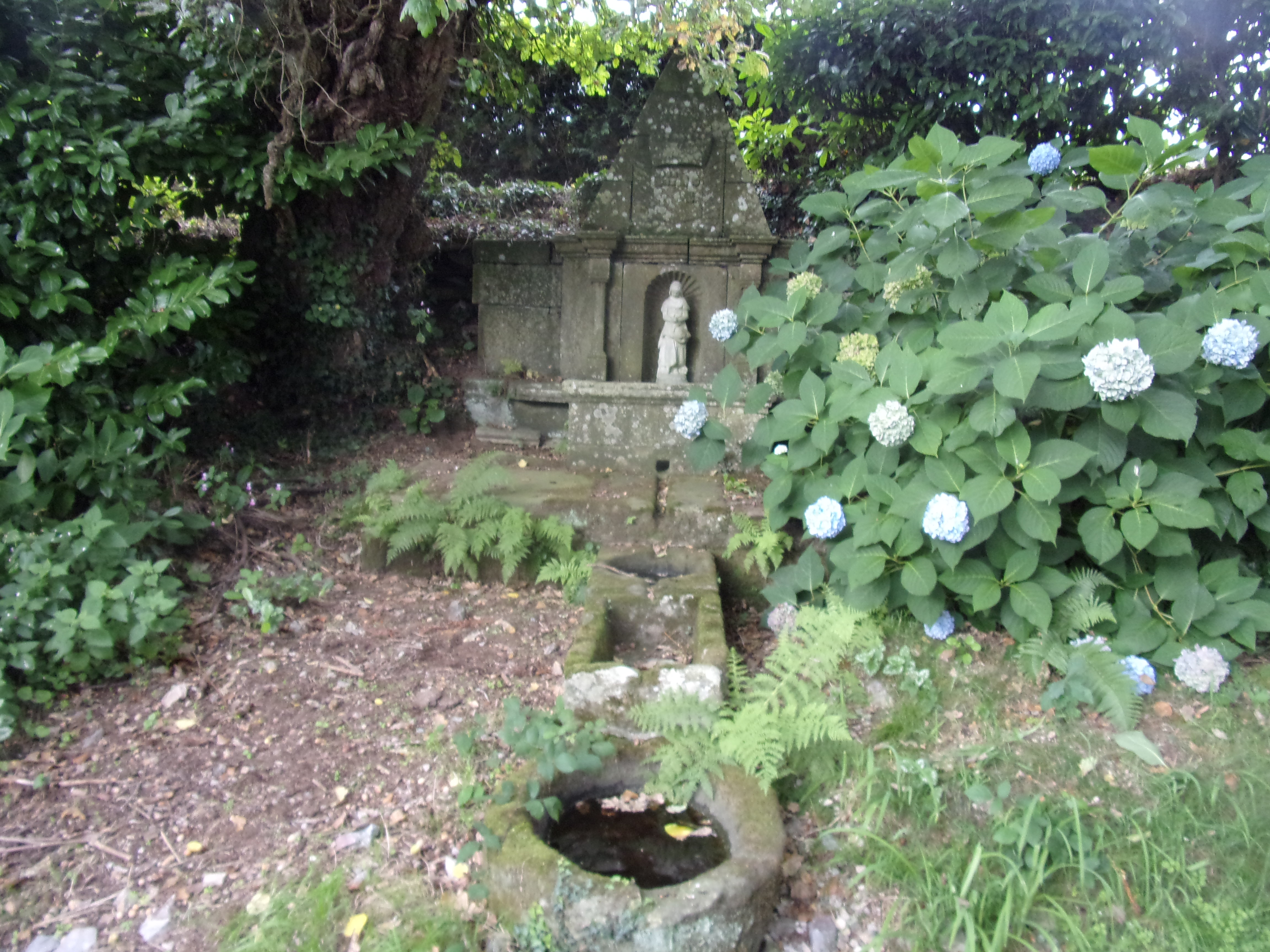
Fountain of Saint-Méen.

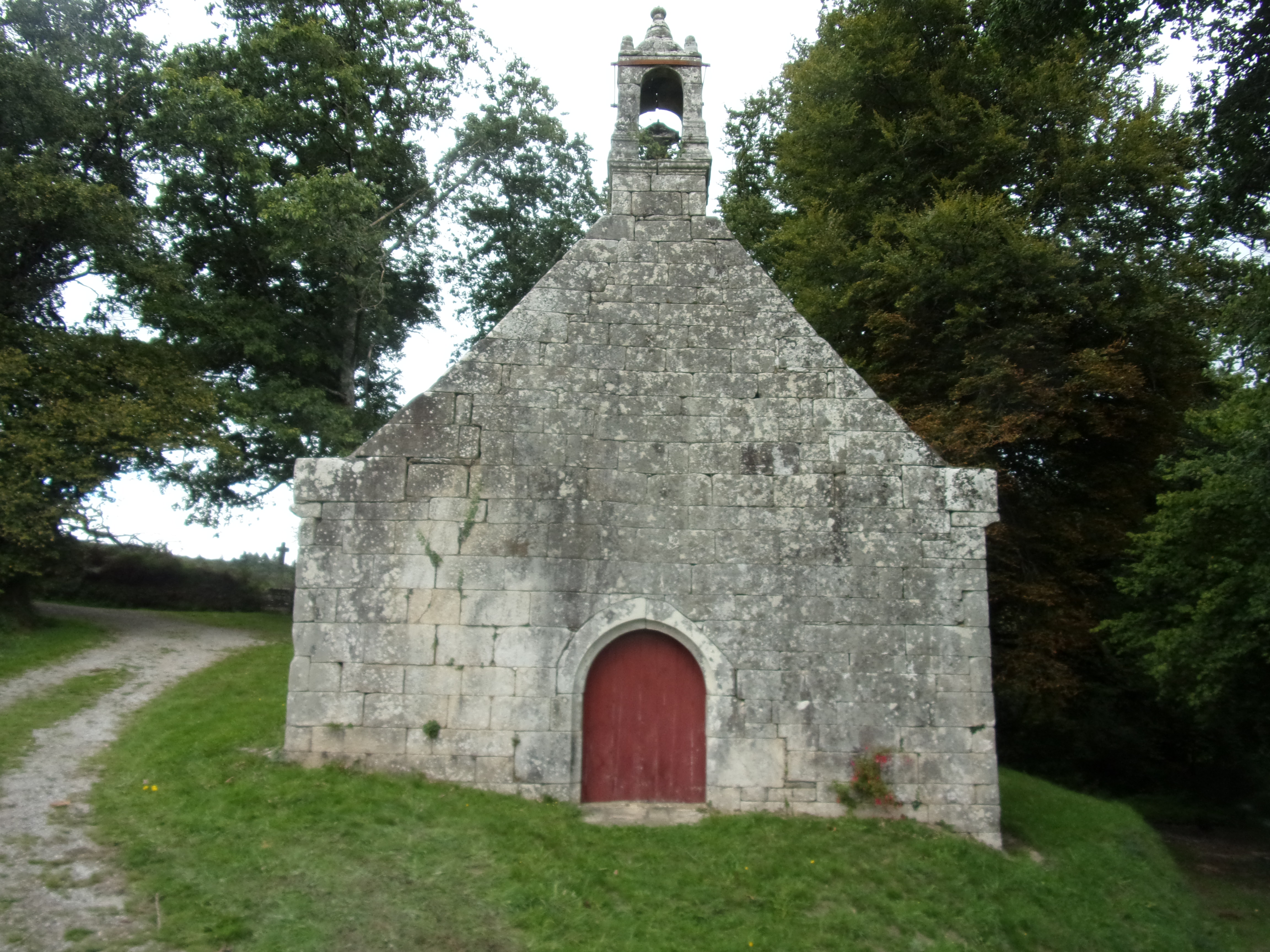
The chapel of Saint-Trémeur.

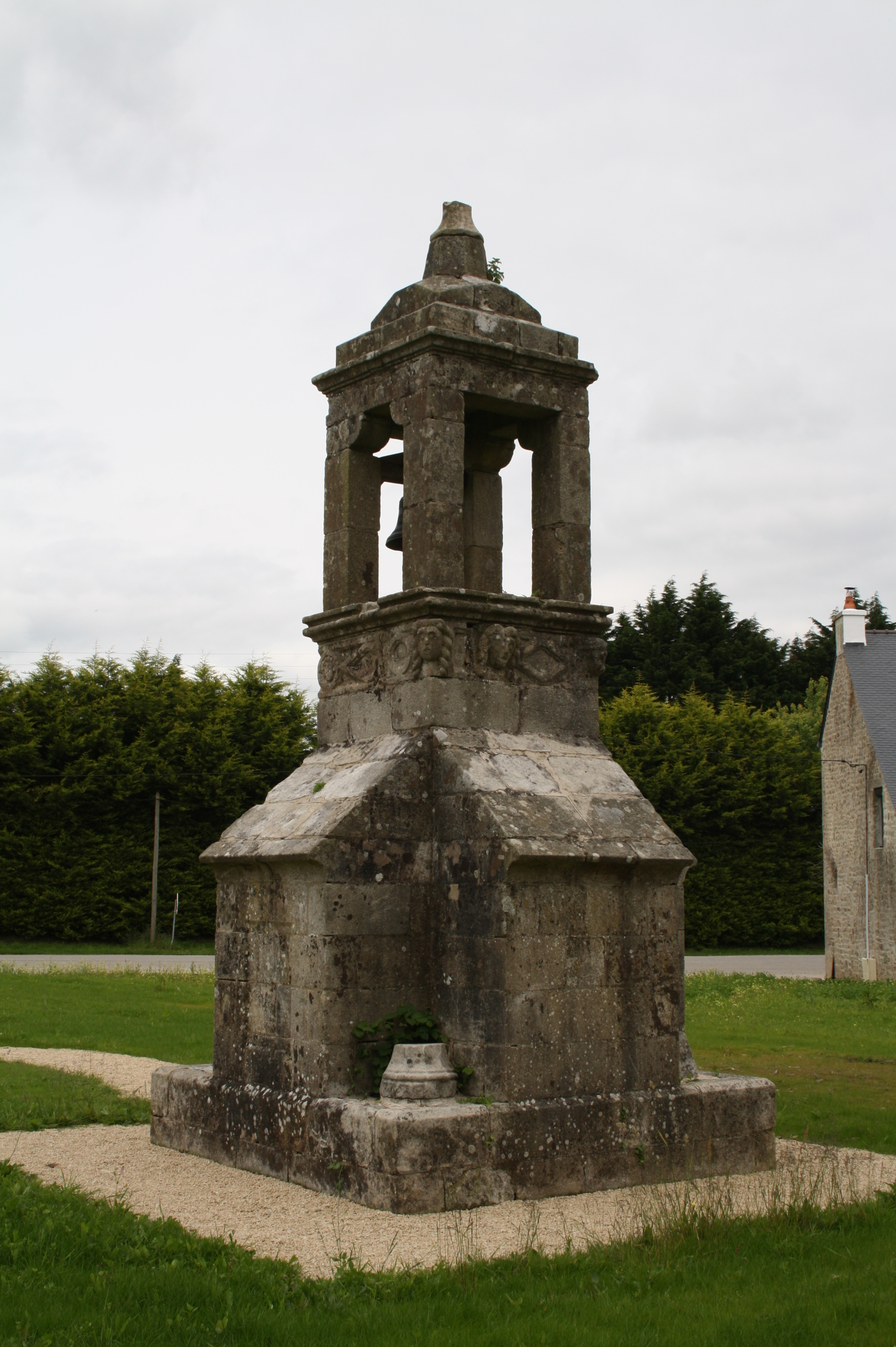
Oratory of Bouthiry.

== See also ==
- Communes of the Morbihan department
