= Saint-Congard =

Saint-Congard Sant-Congar
- Commune
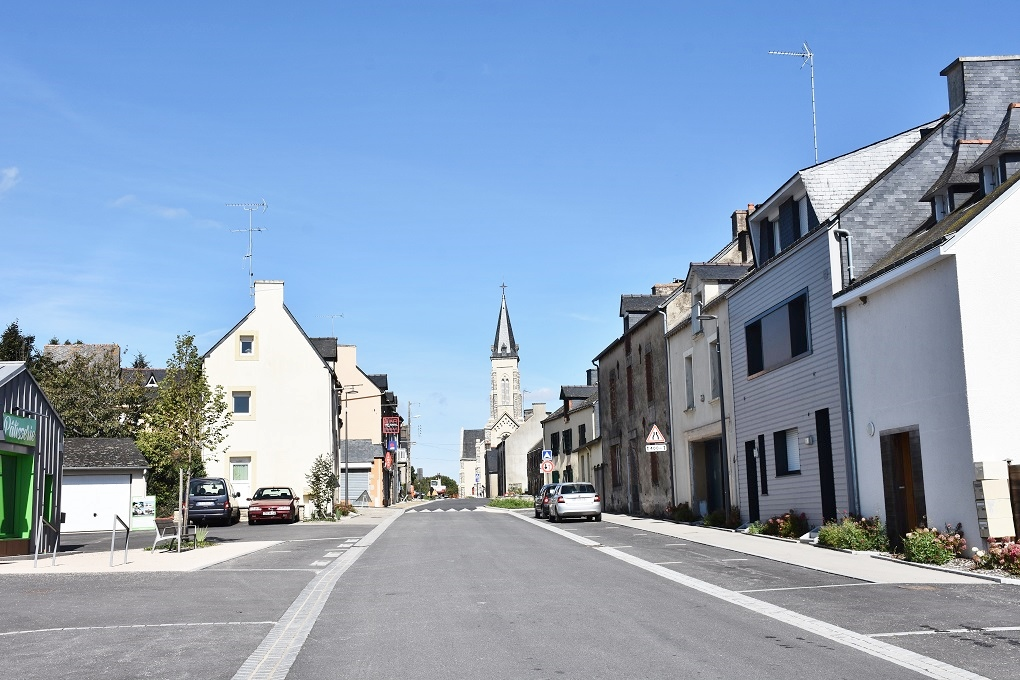
- A street in Saint-Congard (rue de Redon).

- Coat of arms
- Location of Saint-Congard
- Location within France Location within Brittany
- Coordinates: 47°46′16″N 2°18′58″W
- Country: France
- Region: Brittany
- Department: Morbihan
- Arrondissement: Vannes
- Canton: Moréac
- Intercommunality: CC de l'Oust à Brocéliande

Government
  - Mayor (2026–32): Didier Hurtebize
- Area^{1}: 21.87 km^{2} (8.44 sq mi)
- Highest elevation: 102 m (335 ft)
- Lowest elevation: 5 m (16 ft)
- Population (2023): 792
  - Density: 36.2/km^{2} (93.8/sq mi)
- Time zone: UTC+01:00 (CET)
  - Summer (DST): UTC+02:00 (CEST)
- INSEE/Postal code: 56211 /56140
- ^{1} French Land Register data, which excludes lakes, ponds, glaciers > 1 km^{2} (0.386 sq mi or 247 acres) and river estuaries.

Saint-Congard (French pronunciation: [sɛ̃ kɔ̃ɡaʁ]; Breton: Sant-Kongar) is a commune in the Morbihan department of Brittany in north-western France. Inhabitants of Saint-Congard are called in French Saint-Congardais.

== See also ==
- Communes of the Morbihan department
