= Saint-Guyomard =

Saint-Guyomard Sant-Gwioñvarc'h
- Commune
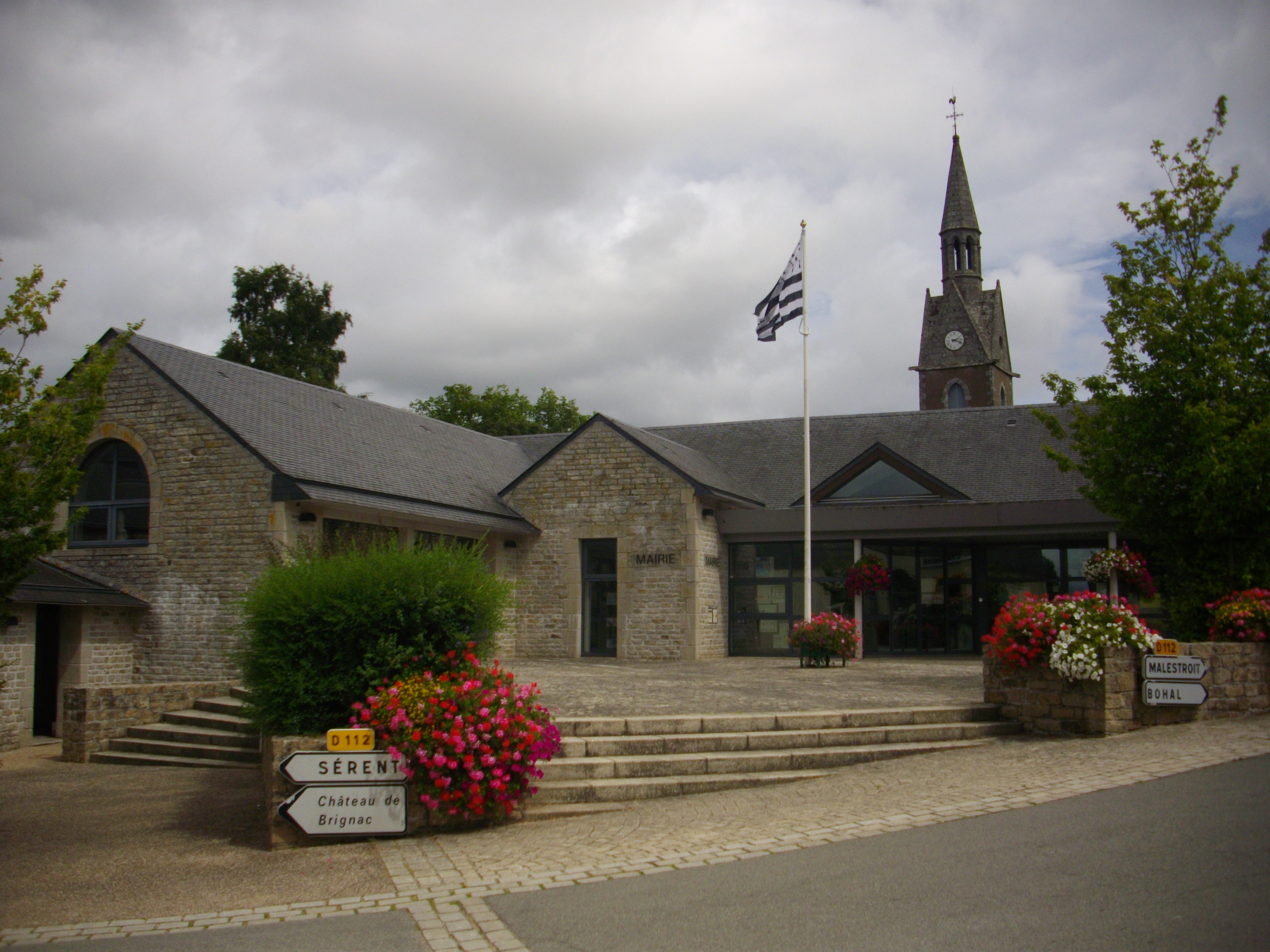
- The town hall in Saint-Guyomard

- Coat of arms
- Location of Saint-Guyomard
- Location within France Location within Brittany
- Coordinates: 47°46′54″N 2°30′45″W
- Country: France
- Region: Brittany
- Department: Morbihan
- Arrondissement: Vannes
- Canton: Moréac
- Intercommunality: CC de l'Oust à Brocéliande

Government
  - Mayor (2026–32): Maurice Braud
- Area^{1}: 19.66 km^{2} (7.59 sq mi)
- Highest elevation: 108 m (354 ft)
- Lowest elevation: 20 m (66 ft)
- Population (2023): 1,468
  - Density: 74.67/km^{2} (193.4/sq mi)
- Time zone: UTC+01:00 (CET)
  - Summer (DST): UTC+02:00 (CEST)
- INSEE/Postal code: 56219 /56460
- ^{1} French Land Register data, which excludes lakes, ponds, glaciers > 1 km^{2} (0.386 sq mi or 247 acres) and river estuaries.

Saint-Guyomard (French pronunciation: [sɛ̃ ɡɥijɔmaʁ]; Breton: Sant-Gwioñvarc'h) is a commune in the Morbihan department of Brittany in north-western France.

== Demographics ==
Inhabitants of Saint-Guyomard are called in French Guyomardais. The official population in 2019 was 1,389.

== See also ==
- Communes of the Morbihan department
