= Billio =

Commune in Brittany, France

Billio Bilioù
- Commune
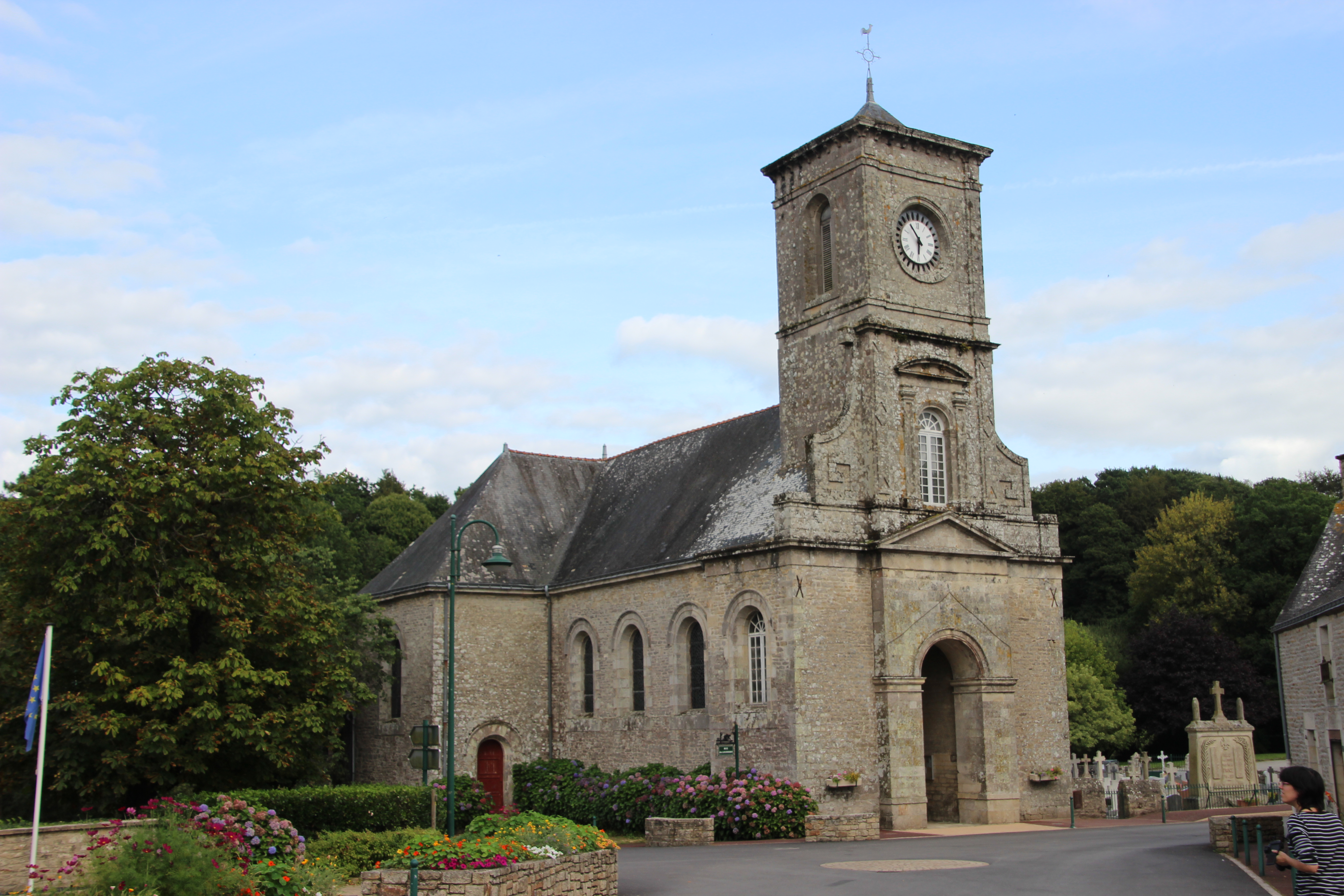
- Church of Notre-Dame.
- Location of Billio
- Location within France Location within Brittany
- Coordinates: 47°52′09″N 2°37′54″W
- Country: France
- Region: Brittany
- Department: Morbihan
- Arrondissement: Pontivy
- Canton: Moréac
- Intercommunality: Centre Morbihan Communauté

Government
  - Mayor (2026–32): Isabelle Bréhélin
- Area^{1}: 12.03 km^{2} (4.64 sq mi)
- Highest elevation: 167 m (548 ft)
- Lowest elevation: 81 m (266 ft)
- Population (2023): 335
  - Density: 27.8/km^{2} (72.1/sq mi)
- Time zone: UTC+01:00 (CET)
  - Summer (DST): UTC+02:00 (CEST)
- INSEE/Postal code: 56019 /56420
- ^{1} French Land Register data, which excludes lakes, ponds, glaciers > 1 km^{2} (0.386 sq mi or 247 acres) and river estuaries.

Billio (French pronunciation: [biljo]; Breton: Bilioù) is a commune in the Morbihan department of Brittany in northwestern France.

== Population ==
Inhabitants of Billio are called Billiotais in French.

== See also ==
- Communes of the Morbihan department
