= Bohal, Morbihan =

Commune in Brittany, France

Bohal
- Commune
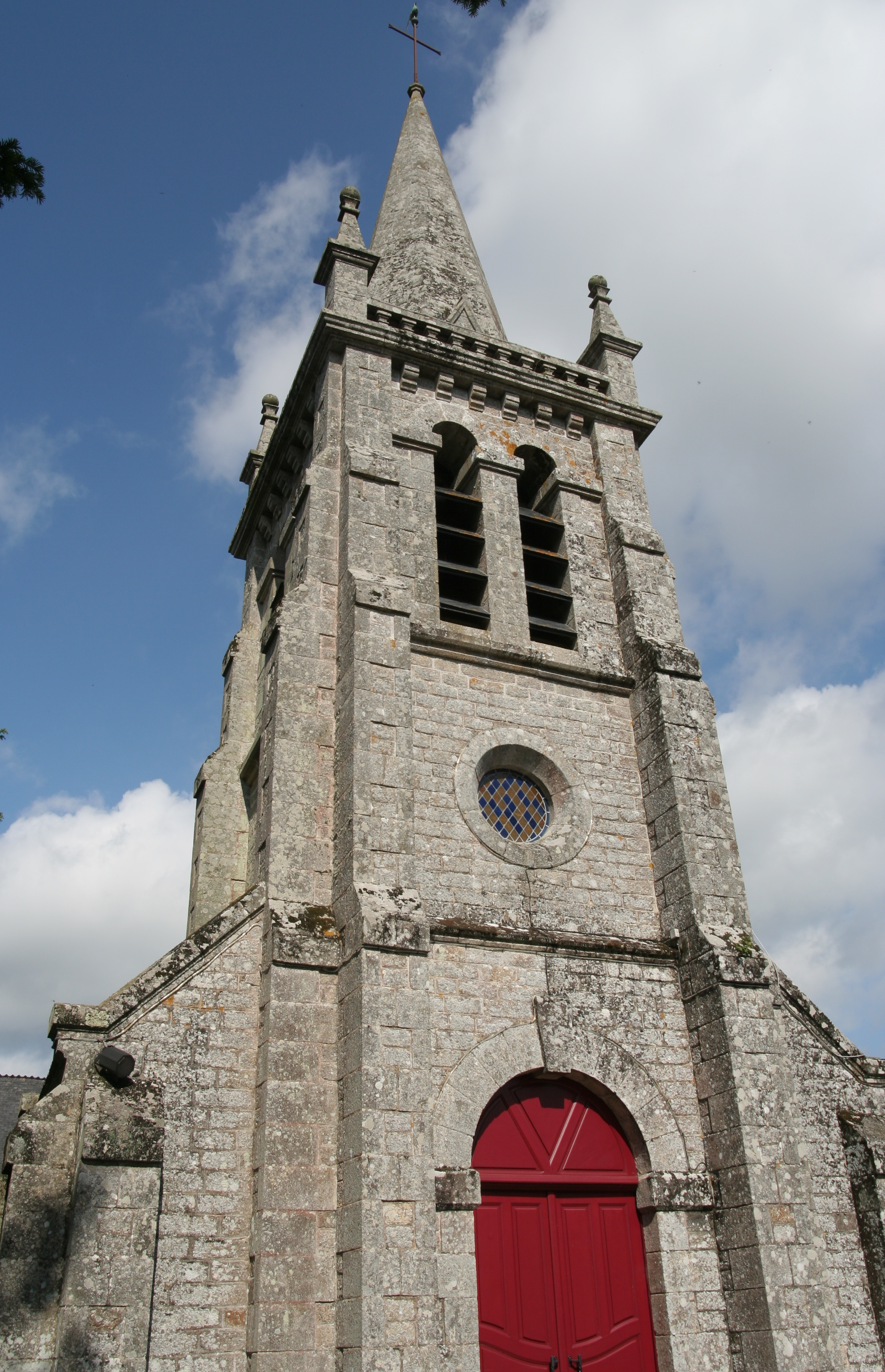
- The church of Saint-Gildas, in Bohal

- Coat of arms
- Location of Bohal
- Location within France Location within Brittany
- Coordinates: 47°46′56″N 2°26′10″W
- Country: France
- Region: Brittany
- Department: Morbihan
- Arrondissement: Vannes
- Canton: Moréac
- Intercommunality: CC de l'Oust à Brocéliande

Government
  - Mayor (2026–32): Alain de Chabannes
- Area^{1}: 8.45 km^{2} (3.26 sq mi)
- Highest elevation: 90 m (300 ft)
- Lowest elevation: 17 m (56 ft)
- Population (2023): 873
  - Density: 103/km^{2} (268/sq mi)
- Time zone: UTC+01:00 (CET)
  - Summer (DST): UTC+02:00 (CEST)
- INSEE/Postal code: 56020 /56140
- ^{1} French Land Register data, which excludes lakes, ponds, glaciers > 1 km^{2} (0.386 sq mi or 247 acres) and river estuaries.

Bohal (French pronunciation: [bɔ.al]; Breton: Bohal) is a commune in the Morbihan department of Brittany in northwestern France.

== Population ==
Inhabitants of Bohal are called in French Bohalais.

== See also ==
- Communes of the Morbihan department
