= Moréac =

Moréac Mourieg
- Commune
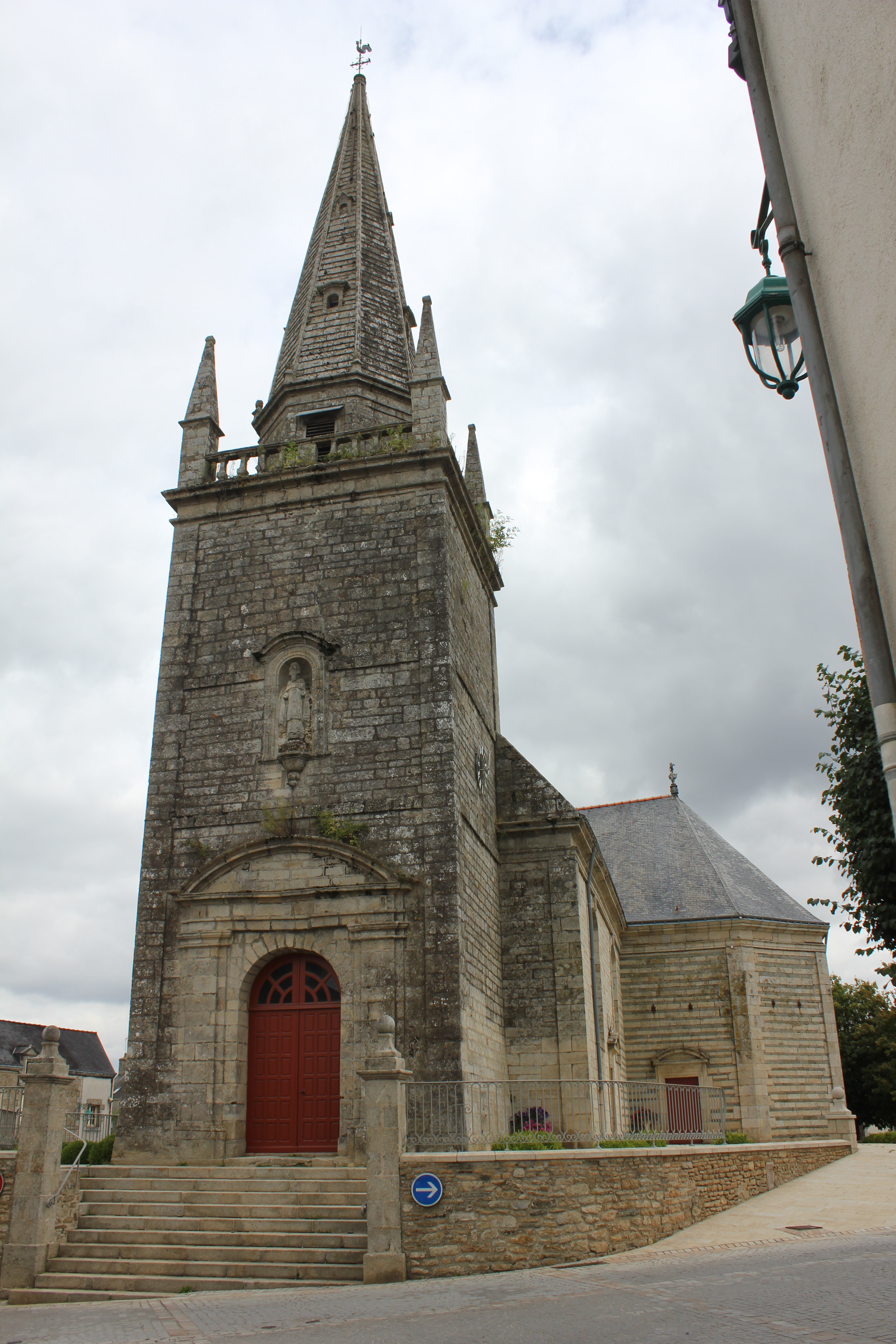
- The Church of Saint-Cyr, in Moréac

- Coat of arms
- Location of Moréac
- Location within France Location within Brittany
- Coordinates: 47°55′N 2°49′W
- Country: France
- Region: Brittany
- Department: Morbihan
- Arrondissement: Pontivy
- Canton: Moréac

Government
  - Mayor (2026–32): Pascal Roselier
- Area^{1}: 60.30 km^{2} (23.28 sq mi)
- Highest elevation: 149 m (489 ft)
- Lowest elevation: 57 m (187 ft)
- Population (2023): 3,704
  - Density: 61.43/km^{2} (159.1/sq mi)
- Time zone: UTC+01:00 (CET)
  - Summer (DST): UTC+02:00 (CEST)
- INSEE/Postal code: 56140 /56500
- ^{1} French Land Register data, which excludes lakes, ponds, glaciers > 1 km^{2} (0.386 sq mi or 247 acres) and river estuaries.

Moréac (Breton: Mourieg) is a commune in the Morbihan department of Brittany in north-western France.

== Geography ==
The Ruisseau de Kerropert forms part of the commune's eastern border, then flows into the Ével, which forms its northern border.

== Population ==
Historical population
Year	Pop.	±% p.a.
1968	2,593	—
1975	2,662	+0.38%
1982	2,766	+0.55%
1990	2,920	+0.68%
1999	2,893	−0.10%
2007	3,442	+2.20%
2012	3,890	+2.48%
2017	3,765	−0.65%
2023	3,704	−0.27%
Source: INSEE

Inhabitants of Moréac are called in French Moréacois.

== Breton language ==
In 2008, there was 22,12% of the children attended the bilingual schools in primary education.

== See also ==
- Communes of the Morbihan department
