= Saint-Nicolas-du-Tertre =

Saint-Nicolas-du-Tertre Sant-Nikolaz-ar-Roz
- Commune
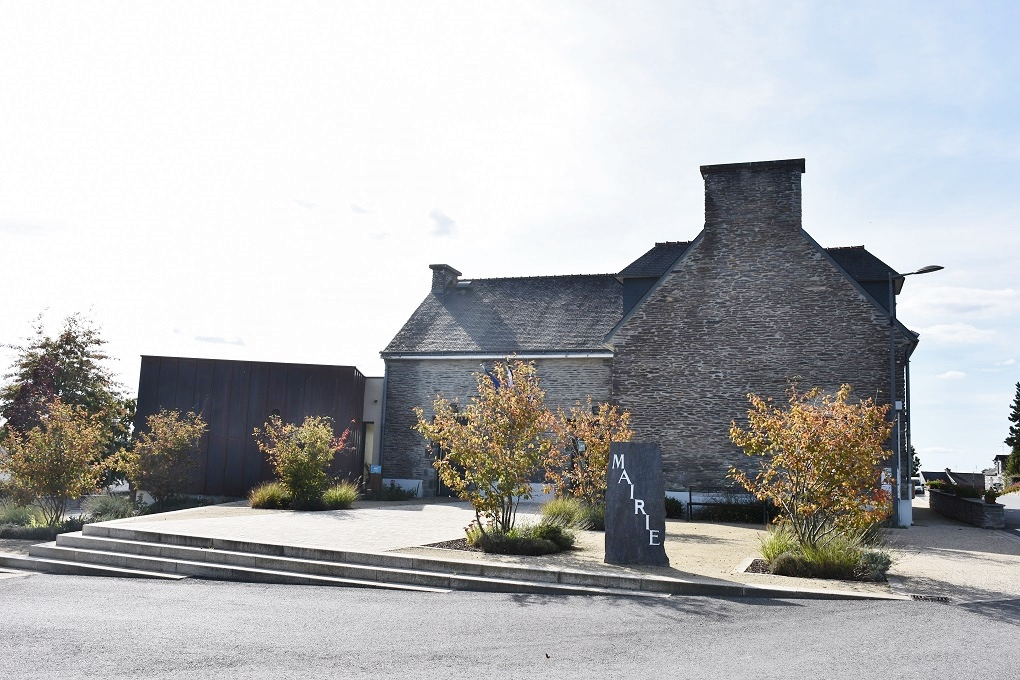
- The Town hall of Saint-Nicolas-du-Tertre.

- Coat of arms
- Location of Saint-Nicolas-du-Tertre
- Location within France Location within Brittany
- Coordinates: 47°48′14″N 2°13′14″W
- Country: France
- Region: Brittany
- Department: Morbihan
- Arrondissement: Vannes
- Canton: Moréac
- Intercommunality: CC de l'Oust à Brocéliande

Government
  - Mayor (2026–32): Mickaël Le Goué
- Area^{1}: 12.93 km^{2} (4.99 sq mi)
- Highest elevation: 107 m (351 ft)
- Lowest elevation: 22 m (72 ft)
- Population (2023): 469
  - Density: 36.3/km^{2} (93.9/sq mi)
- Time zone: UTC+01:00 (CET)
  - Summer (DST): UTC+02:00 (CEST)
- INSEE/Postal code: 56230 /56910
- ^{1} French Land Register data, which excludes lakes, ponds, glaciers > 1 km^{2} (0.386 sq mi or 247 acres) and river estuaries.

Saint-Nicolas-du-Tertre (French pronunciation: [sɛ̃ nikɔla dy tɛʁtʁ]; Breton: Sant-Nikolaz-ar-Roz) is a commune in the Morbihan department of Brittany in north-western France.

== See also ==
- Communes of the Morbihan department
