= Ruffiac, Morbihan =

Ruffiac Rufieg
- Commune
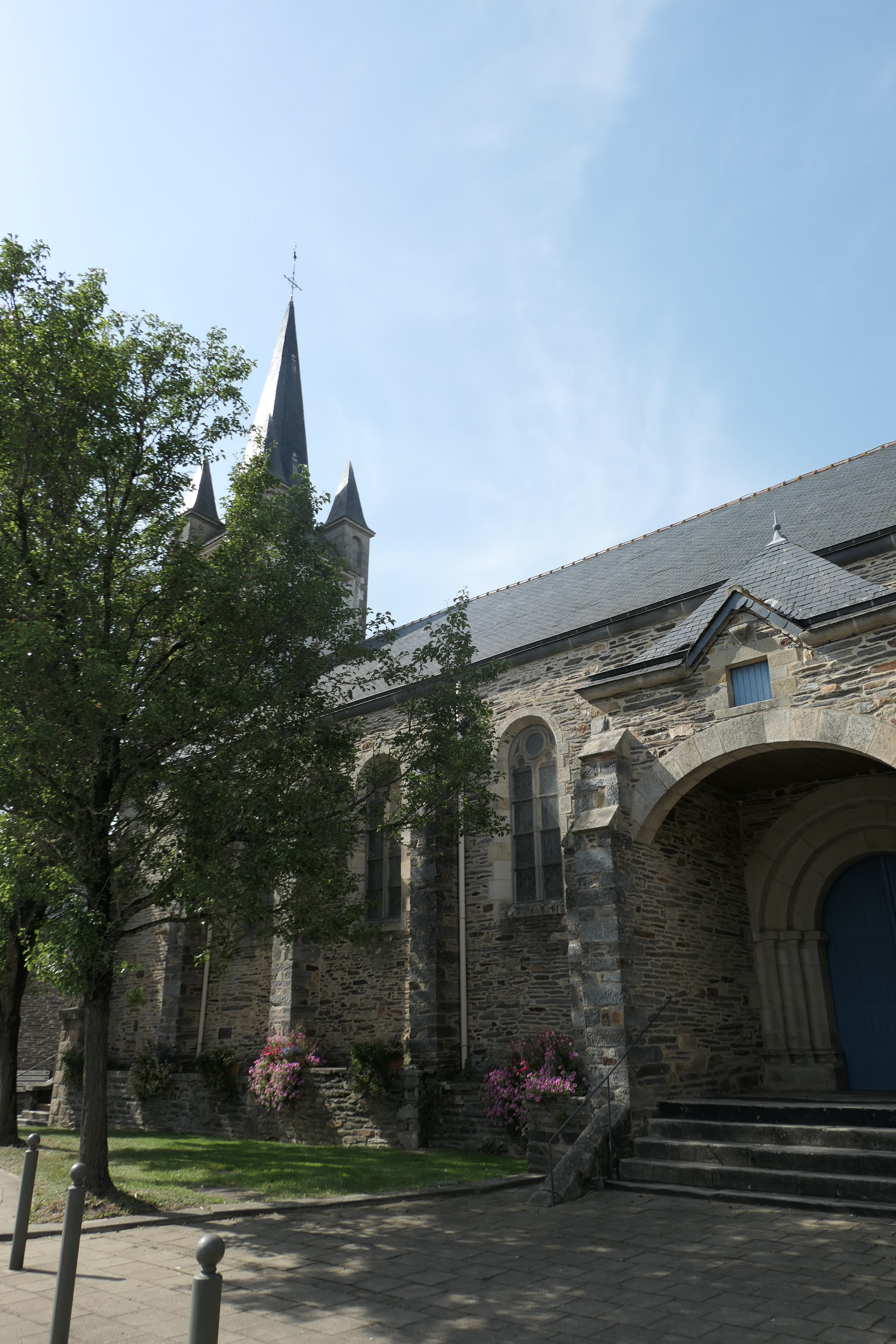
- The church Saint-Pierre-et-Saint-Paul.

- Coat of arms
- Location of Ruffiac
- Location within France Location within Brittany
- Coordinates: 47°49′09″N 2°16′50″W
- Country: France
- Region: Brittany
- Department: Morbihan
- Arrondissement: Vannes
- Canton: Moréac
- Intercommunality: CC de l'Oust à Brocéliande

Government
  - Mayor (2026–32): Thierry Gué
- Area^{1}: 36.47 km^{2} (14.08 sq mi)
- Highest elevation: 102 m (335 ft)
- Lowest elevation: 10 m (33 ft)
- Population (2023): 1,422
  - Density: 38.99/km^{2} (101.0/sq mi)
- Time zone: UTC+01:00 (CET)
  - Summer (DST): UTC+02:00 (CEST)
- INSEE/Postal code: 56200 /56140
- ^{1} French Land Register data, which excludes lakes, ponds, glaciers > 1 km^{2} (0.386 sq mi or 247 acres) and river estuaries.

Ruffiac (French pronunciation: [ʁyfjak]; Breton: Rufieg) is a commune in the Morbihan department of Brittany in north-western France. Inhabitants of Ruffiac are called in French Ruffiacois.

== See also ==
- Communes of the Morbihan department
