= Saint-Laurent-sur-Oust =

Saint-Laurent-sur-Oust Sant-Laorañs-Graeneg
- Commune
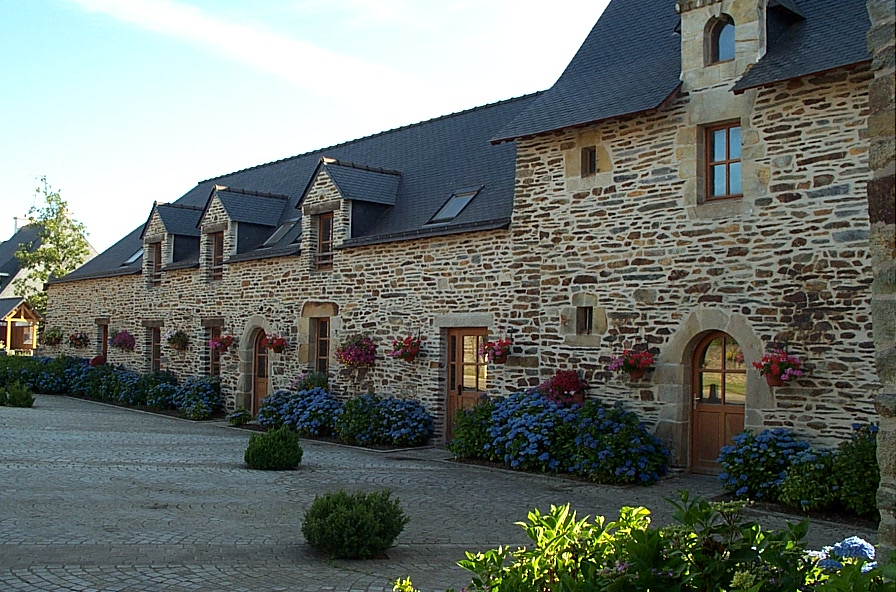
- Manor in Saint-Laurent-sur-Oust.

- Coat of arms
- Location of Saint-Laurent-sur-Oust
- Location within France Location within Brittany
- Coordinates: 47°47′42″N 2°19′07″W
- Country: France
- Region: Brittany
- Department: Morbihan
- Arrondissement: Vannes
- Canton: Moréac
- Intercommunality: CC de l'Oust à Brocéliande

Government
  - Mayor (2026–32): Rémi Michel
- Area^{1}: 3.88 km^{2} (1.50 sq mi)
- Highest elevation: 97 m (318 ft)
- Lowest elevation: 7 m (23 ft)
- Population (2023): 396
  - Density: 102/km^{2} (264/sq mi)
- Time zone: UTC+01:00 (CET)
  - Summer (DST): UTC+02:00 (CEST)
- INSEE/Postal code: 56224 /56140
- ^{1} French Land Register data, which excludes lakes, ponds, glaciers > 1 km^{2} (0.386 sq mi or 247 acres) and river estuaries.

Saint-Laurent-sur-Oust (French pronunciation: [sɛ̃ loʁɑ̃ syʁ ust], literally Saint-Laurent on Oust; Breton: Sant-Laorañs-Graeneg, before 1995: Saint-Laurent) is a commune in the Morbihan department of Brittany in north-western France. Inhabitants of Saint-Laurent-sur-Oust are called in French Laurentins.

== See also ==
- Communes of the Morbihan department
