= Canton of Moréac =

Coordinates: 47.92°N 2.82°W

The canton of Moréac is an administrative division of the Morbihan department, northwestern France. It was created at the French canton reorganisation which came into effect in March 2015. Its seat is in Moréac.

It consists of the following communes:

1. Bignan
2. Billio
3. Bohal
4. Buléon
5. Caro
6. Guéhenno
7. Lizio
8. Malestroit
9. Missiriac
10. Moréac
11. Pleucadeuc
12. Plumelec
13. Ruffiac
14. Saint-Abraham
15. Saint-Allouestre
16. Saint-Congard
17. Saint-Guyomard
18. Saint-Jean-Brévelay
19. Saint-Laurent-sur-Oust
20. Saint-Marcel
21. Saint-Nicolas-du-Tertre
22. Sérent
23. Val d'Oust
