= Saint-Marcel, Morbihan =

Saint-Marcel Sant-Marc'hell
- Commune
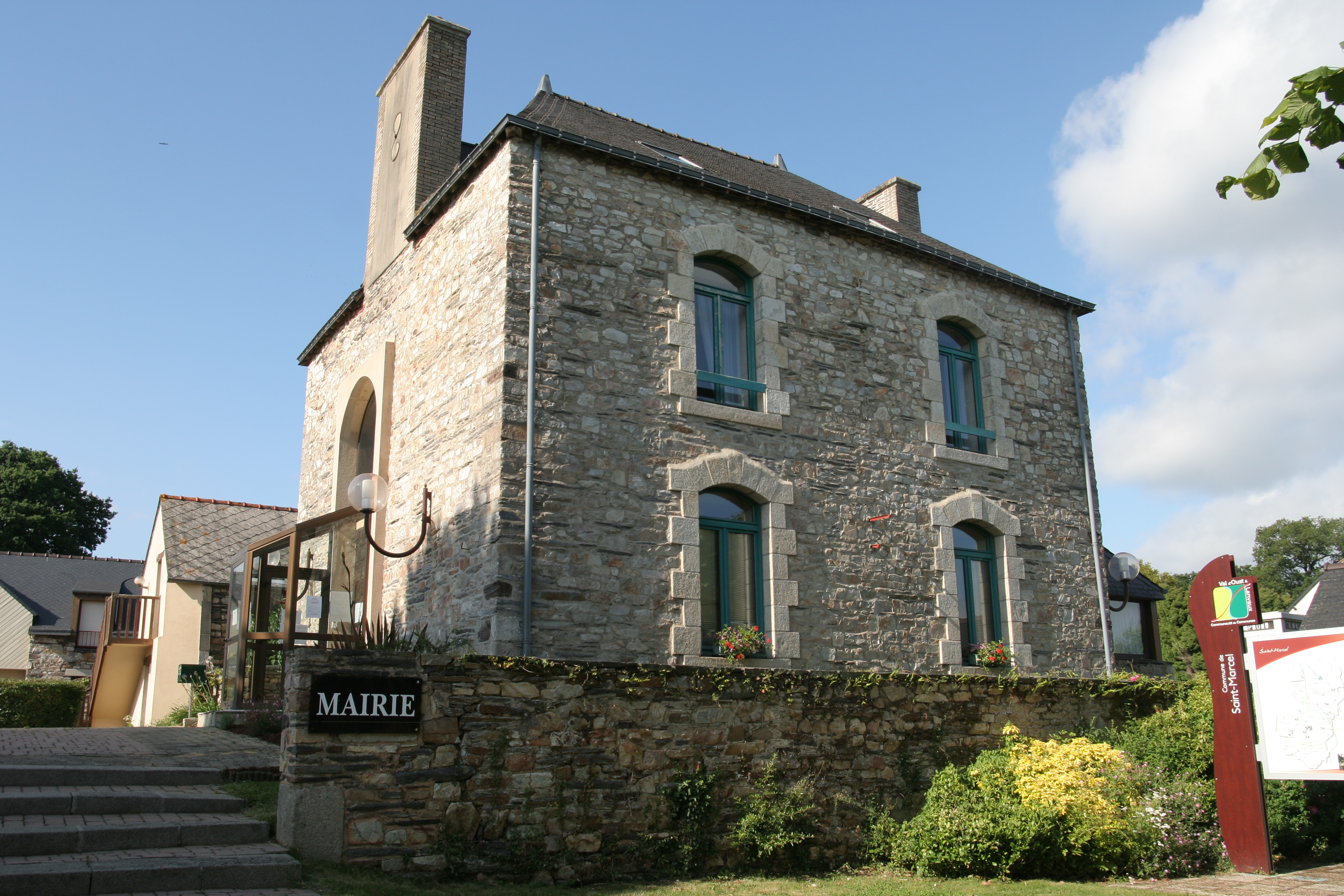
- The town hall in Saint-Marcel
- Location of Saint-Marcel
- Location within France Location within Brittany
- Coordinates: 47°48′18″N 2°25′03″W
- Country: France
- Region: Brittany
- Department: Morbihan
- Arrondissement: Vannes
- Canton: Moréac
- Intercommunality: CC de l'Oust à Brocéliande

Government
  - Mayor (2026–32): Ludovic Boulo
- Area^{1}: 12.81 km^{2} (4.95 sq mi)
- Highest elevation: 112 m (367 ft)
- Lowest elevation: 12 m (39 ft)
- Population (2023): 1,155
  - Density: 90.16/km^{2} (233.5/sq mi)
- Time zone: UTC+01:00 (CET)
  - Summer (DST): UTC+02:00 (CEST)
- INSEE/Postal code: 56228 /56140
- ^{1} French Land Register data, which excludes lakes, ponds, glaciers > 1 km^{2} (0.386 sq mi or 247 acres) and river estuaries.

Saint-Marcel (French pronunciation: [sɛ̃ maʁsɛl]; Breton: Sant-Marc'hell) is a commune in the Morbihan department of Brittany in north-western France.

Saint-Marcel houses the Museum of the Breton Resistance which commemorates the uprising of the Maquis of Saint-Marcel (3,000 fighters) and 200 Free French SAS parachutists on 18 June 1944, which the French force under command of Colonel Morice (Paul Chenailler), Free French Pierre Bourgoin and André Hue came under German attack.

== See also ==
- Communes of the Morbihan department
