= Sérent =

Sérent Serent
- Commune
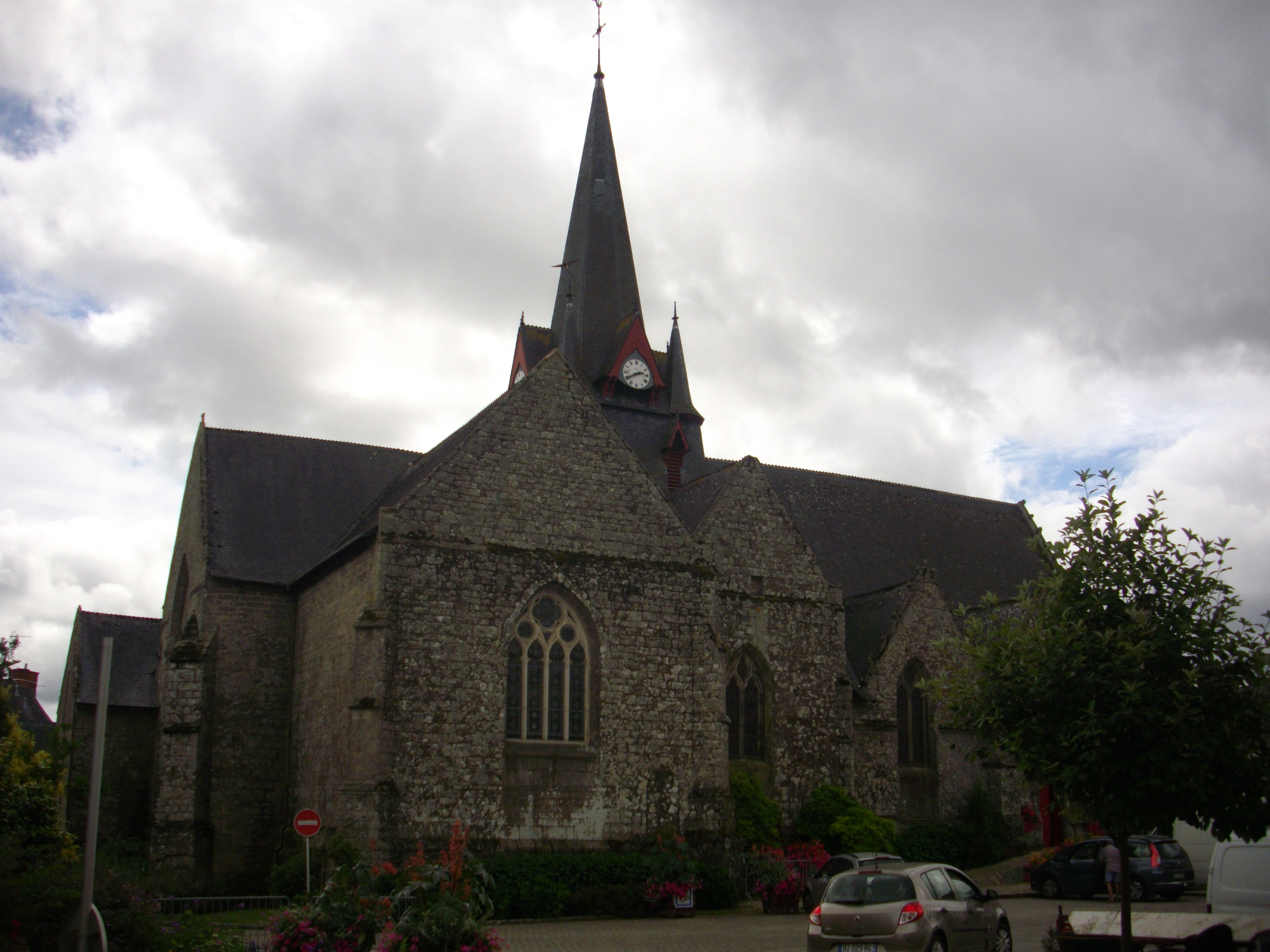
- The church of Saint-Pierre, in Sérent

- Coat of arms
- Location of Sérent
- Location within France Location within Brittany
- Coordinates: 47°49′26″N 2°30′16″W
- Country: France
- Region: Brittany
- Department: Morbihan
- Arrondissement: Vannes
- Canton: Moréac
- Intercommunality: CC de l'Oust à Brocéliande

Government
  - Mayor (2026–32): Rozenn Guegan
- Area^{1}: 59.67 km^{2} (23.04 sq mi)
- Highest elevation: 156 m (512 ft)
- Lowest elevation: 15 m (49 ft)
- Population (2023): 3,429
  - Density: 57.47/km^{2} (148.8/sq mi)
- Time zone: UTC+01:00 (CET)
  - Summer (DST): UTC+02:00 (CEST)
- INSEE/Postal code: 56244 /56460
- ^{1} French Land Register data, which excludes lakes, ponds, glaciers > 1 km^{2} (0.386 sq mi or 247 acres) and river estuaries.

Sérent (Breton: Serent) is a commune in the Morbihan department of Brittany in north-western France.

== Geography ==
Sérent belongs to the natural region of Les Landes de Lanvaux, a forest covered area. Historically it belongs to Vannetais.

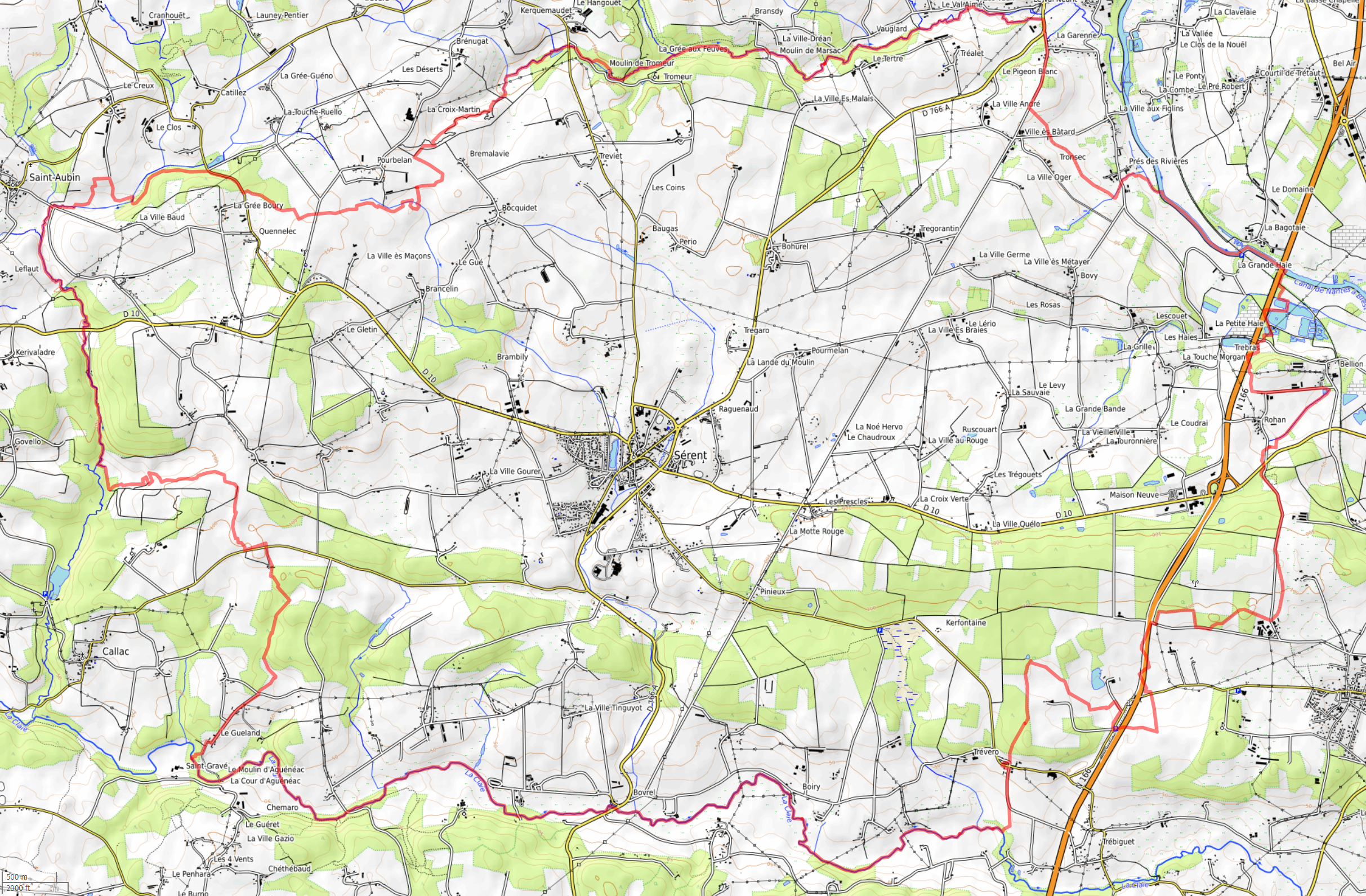
Topographic map.

== Population ==
Historical population
Year	Pop.	±% p.a.
1968	2,445	—
1975	2,399	−0.27%
1982	2,565	+0.96%
1990	2,686	+0.58%
1999	2,716	+0.12%
2007	2,909	+0.86%
2012	3,046	+0.92%
2017	3,048	+0.01%
2023	3,429	+1.98%
Source: INSEE

Inhabitants of Sérent are called in French Sérentais.

== See also ==
- Communes of the Morbihan department
