= Saint-Allouestre =

Saint-Allouestre Sant-Aleustr
- Commune
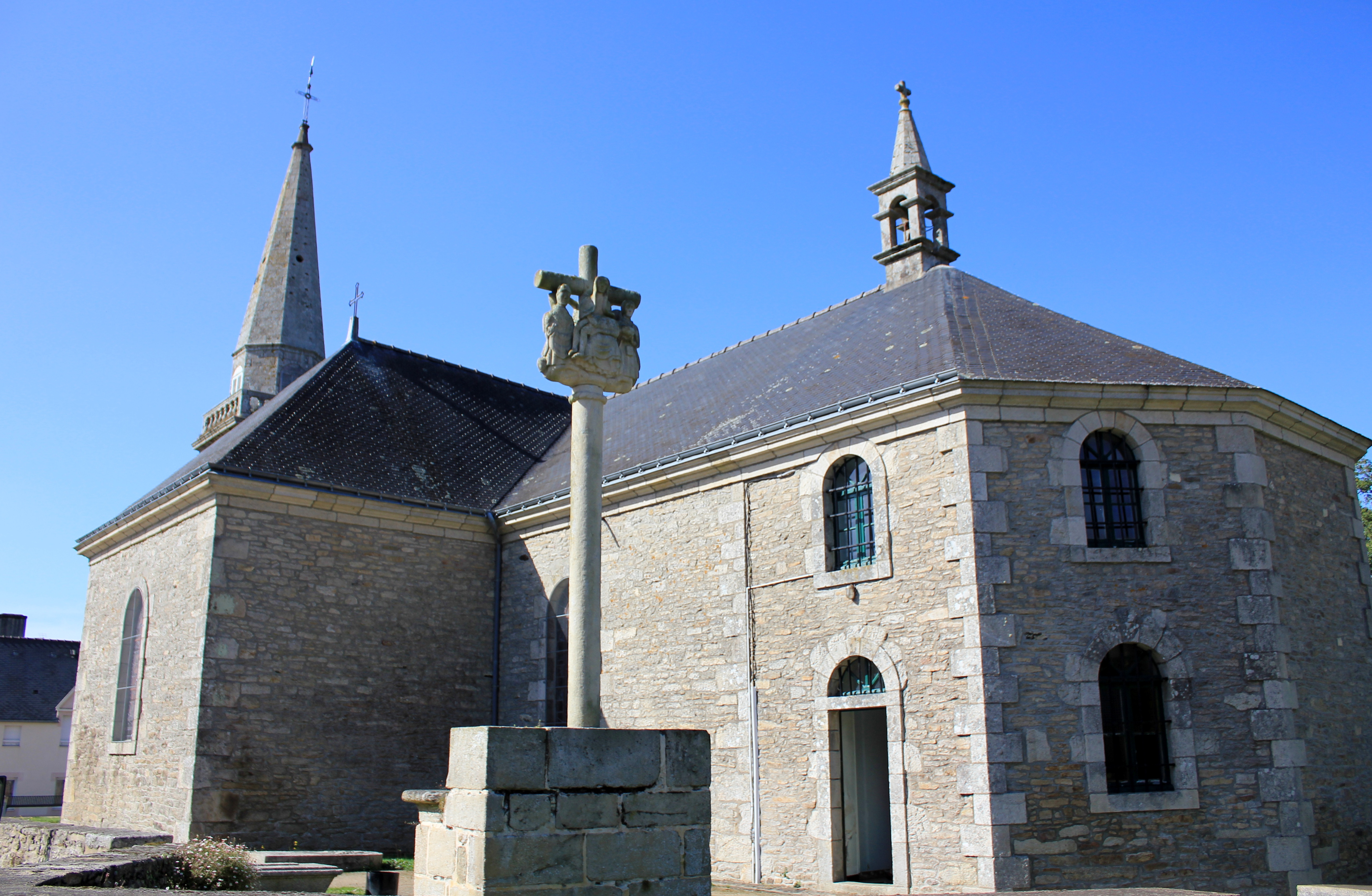
- The church of Saint-Arnould, in Saint-Allouestre

- Coat of arms
- Location of Saint-Allouestre
- Location within France Location within Brittany
- Coordinates: 47°54′38″N 2°43′19″W
- Country: France
- Region: Brittany
- Department: Morbihan
- Arrondissement: Pontivy
- Canton: Moréac
- Intercommunality: Centre Morbihan Communauté

Government
  - Mayor (2026–32): Martine Audic
- Area^{1}: 16.48 km^{2} (6.36 sq mi)
- Highest elevation: 162 m (531 ft)
- Lowest elevation: 72 m (236 ft)
- Population (2023): 675
  - Density: 41.0/km^{2} (106/sq mi)
- Time zone: UTC+01:00 (CET)
  - Summer (DST): UTC+02:00 (CEST)
- INSEE/Postal code: 56204 /56500
- ^{1} French Land Register data, which excludes lakes, ponds, glaciers > 1 km^{2} (0.386 sq mi or 247 acres) and river estuaries.

Saint-Allouestre (French pronunciation: [sɛ̃t‿alwɛstʁ]; Breton: Sant-Aleustr) is a commune in the Morbihan department of Brittany in north-western France. Inhabitants of Saint-Allouestre are called in French Allouestriens.

== See also ==
- Communes of the Morbihan department
