= Caro, Morbihan =

Commune in Brittany, France

Caro Karozh
- Commune
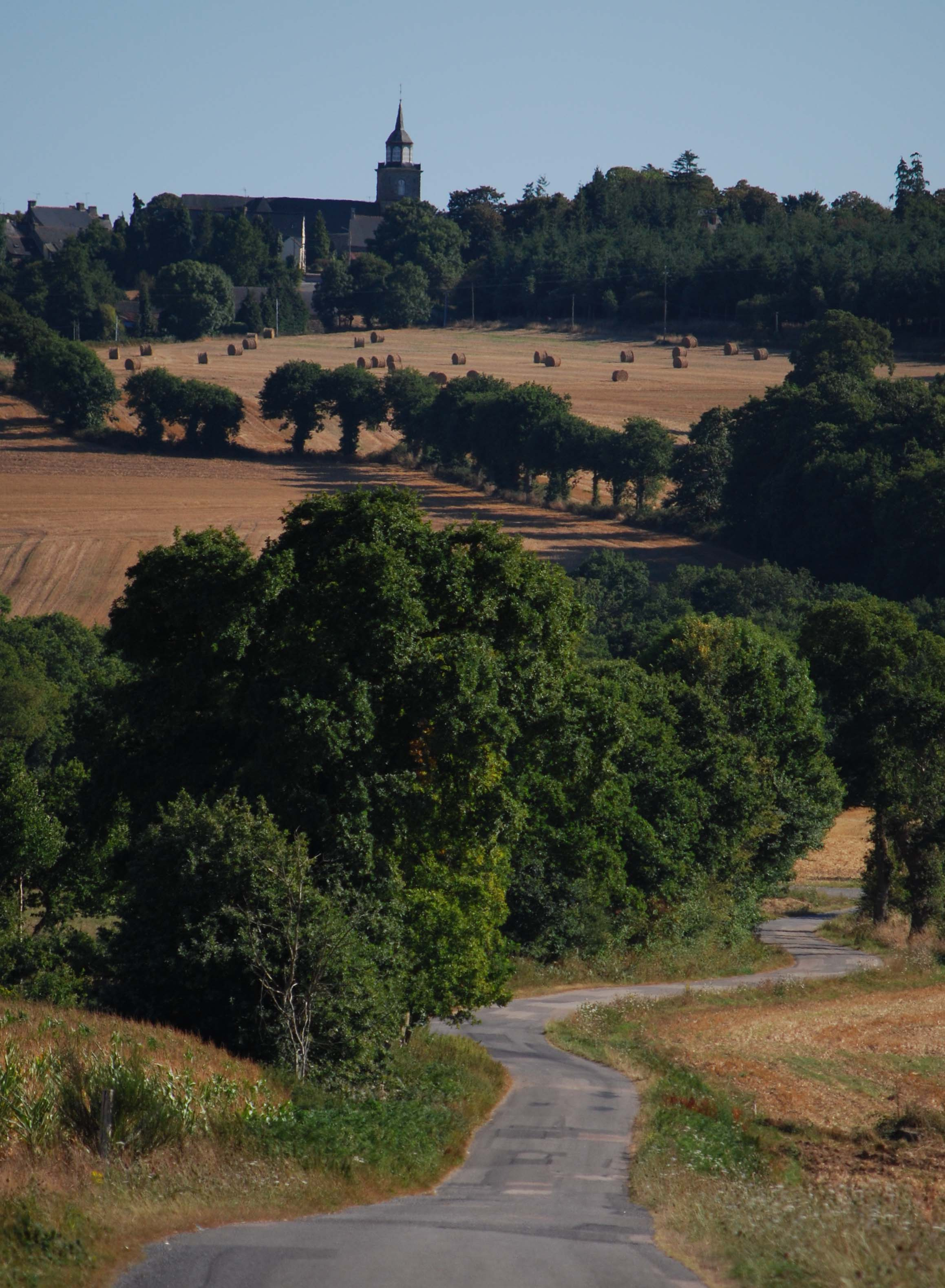
- A general view of Caro

- Coat of arms
- Location of Caro
- Location within France Location within Brittany
- Coordinates: 47°51′53″N 2°19′05″W
- Country: France
- Region: Brittany
- Department: Morbihan
- Arrondissement: Vannes
- Canton: Moréac
- Intercommunality: CC de l'Oust à Brocéliande

Government
  - Mayor (2026–32): Erwan Gicquel
- Area^{1}: 37.74 km^{2} (14.57 sq mi)
- Highest elevation: 128 m (420 ft)
- Lowest elevation: 14 m (46 ft)
- Population (2023): 1,126
  - Density: 29.84/km^{2} (77.27/sq mi)
- Time zone: UTC+01:00 (CET)
  - Summer (DST): UTC+02:00 (CEST)
- INSEE/Postal code: 56035 /56140
- ^{1} French Land Register data, which excludes lakes, ponds, glaciers > 1 km^{2} (0.386 sq mi or 247 acres) and river estuaries.

Caro (French pronunciation: [kaʁo]; Breton: Karozh) is a commune in the Morbihan department of Brittany in north-western France.

== Demographics ==
Inhabitants of Caro are called in French Caroyens.

== See also ==
- Communes of the Morbihan department
