= Lizio =

Commune in Brittany, France

Lizio Lizioù
- Commune
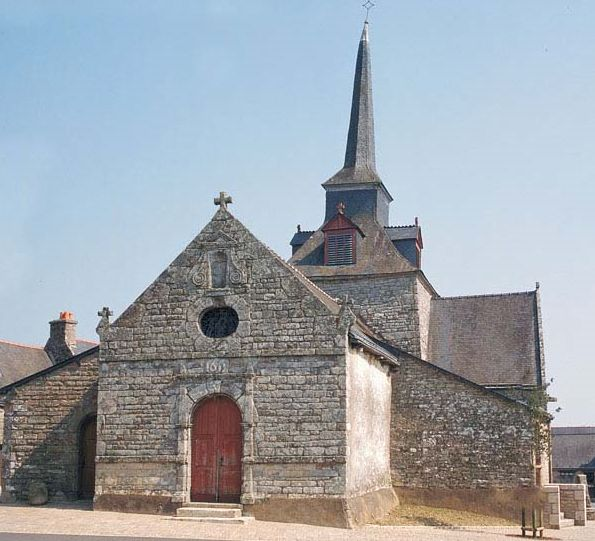
- The church in Lizio

- Coat of arms
- Location of Lizio
- Location within France Location within Brittany
- Coordinates: 47°51′50″N 2°31′30″W
- Country: France
- Region: Brittany
- Department: Morbihan
- Arrondissement: Vannes
- Canton: Moréac
- Intercommunality: CC de l'Oust à Brocéliande

Government
  - Mayor (2026–32): Gwen Guillerme
- Area^{1}: 16.96 km^{2} (6.55 sq mi)
- Highest elevation: 163 m (535 ft)
- Lowest elevation: 42 m (138 ft)
- Population (2023): 840
  - Density: 50/km^{2} (130/sq mi)
- Time zone: UTC+01:00 (CET)
  - Summer (DST): UTC+02:00 (CEST)
- INSEE/Postal code: 56112 /56460
- ^{1} French Land Register data, which excludes lakes, ponds, glaciers > 1 km^{2} (0.386 sq mi or 247 acres) and river estuaries.

Lizio (French pronunciation: [lizjo]; Breton: Lizioù) is a commune in the Morbihan department of Brittany in north-western France. Inhabitants of Lizio are called in French Liziotais.

== See also ==
- Communes of the Morbihan department
