= Saint-Jean-Brévelay =

Saint-Jean-Brévelay Sant-Yann-Brevele
- Commune
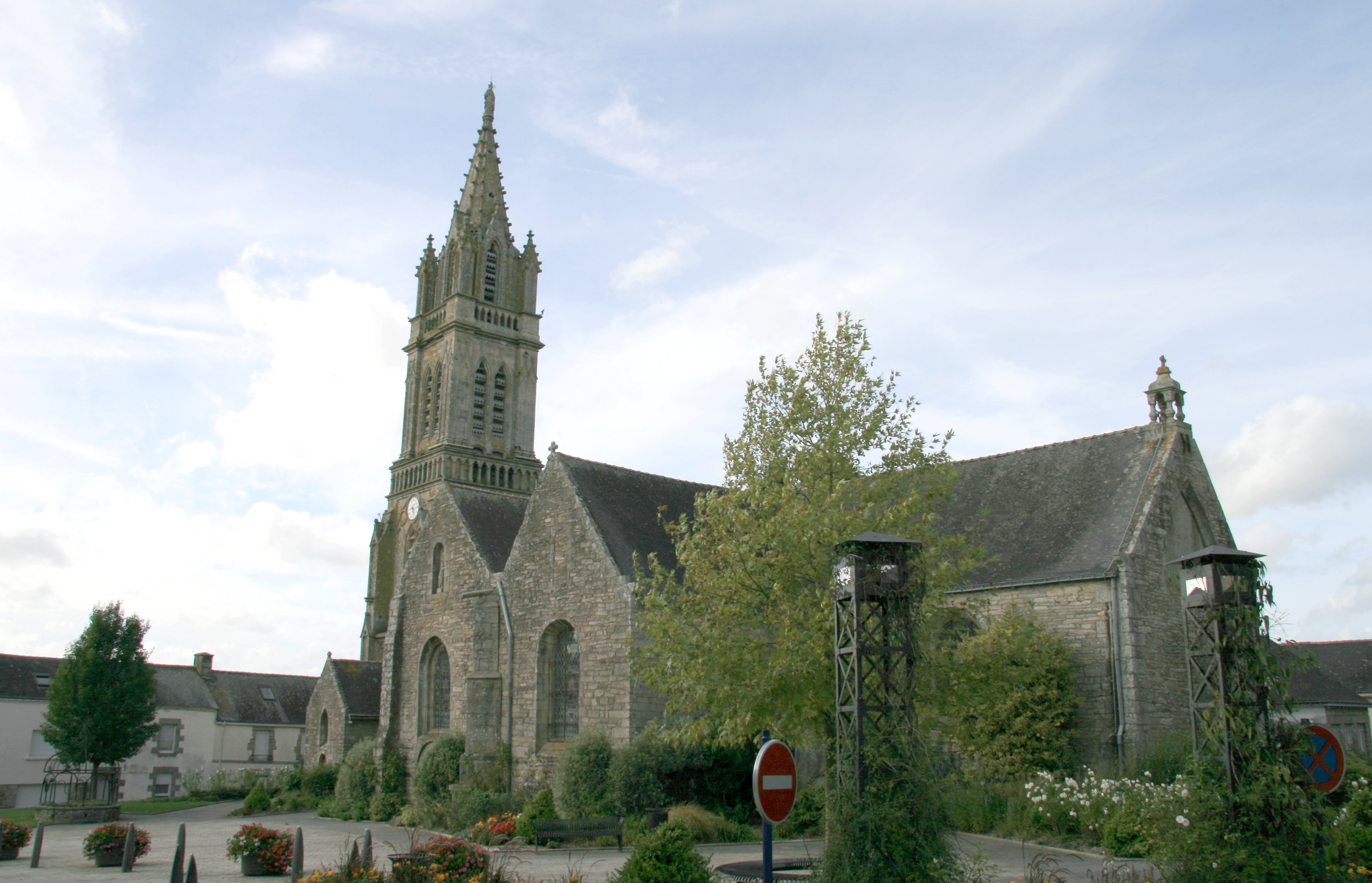
- The Church of Saint-Jean-Brévelay

- Coat of arms
- Location of Saint-Jean-Brévelay
- Location within France Location within Brittany
- Coordinates: 47°50′45″N 2°43′15″W
- Country: France
- Region: Brittany
- Department: Morbihan
- Arrondissement: Pontivy
- Canton: Moréac
- Intercommunality: Centre Morbihan Communauté

Government
  - Mayor (2026–32): Guénaël Robin
- Area^{1}: 41.83 km^{2} (16.15 sq mi)
- Highest elevation: 164 m (538 ft)
- Lowest elevation: 42 m (138 ft)
- Population (2023): 2,869
  - Density: 68.59/km^{2} (177.6/sq mi)
- Time zone: UTC+01:00 (CET)
  - Summer (DST): UTC+02:00 (CEST)
- INSEE/Postal code: 56222 /56660
- ^{1} French Land Register data, which excludes lakes, ponds, glaciers > 1 km^{2} (0.386 sq mi or 247 acres) and river estuaries.

Saint-Jean-Brévelay (Breton: Sant-Yann-Brevele, named after saint John of Beverley) is a commune in the Morbihan department of Brittany in north-western France.

== Population ==
Historical population
Year	Pop.	±% p.a.
1968	1,873	—
1975	2,132	+1.87%
1982	2,287	+1.01%
1990	2,354	+0.36%
1999	2,368	+0.07%
2007	2,627	+1.31%
2012	2,765	+1.03%
2017	2,789	+0.17%
2023	2,869	+0.47%
Source: INSEE

Inhabitants of Saint-Jean-Brévelay are called in French Brévelais.

== Administration ==
The mayor of Saint-Jean-Brévelay is Guénaël Robin. Saint-Jean-Brévelay is part of the communauté de communes Centre Morbihan Communauté.

== International relations ==
Saint-Jean-Brévelay is twinned with Botley, United Kingdom.

== Sport ==
Two football clubs bear the name of Saint-Jean-Brévelay, Espérance Football-Club de Saint-Jean-Brévelay and Amicale Sportive Brévelaise. Both clubs share the Stade Municipal for their home games. There are two clubs in this small city for historical and religious reasons, the first one is catholic and the second one is secular.

== See also ==
- Communes of the Morbihan department
