= Saint-Caradec-Trégomel =

Saint-Caradec-Trégomel Sant-Karadeg-Tregonvael
- Commune
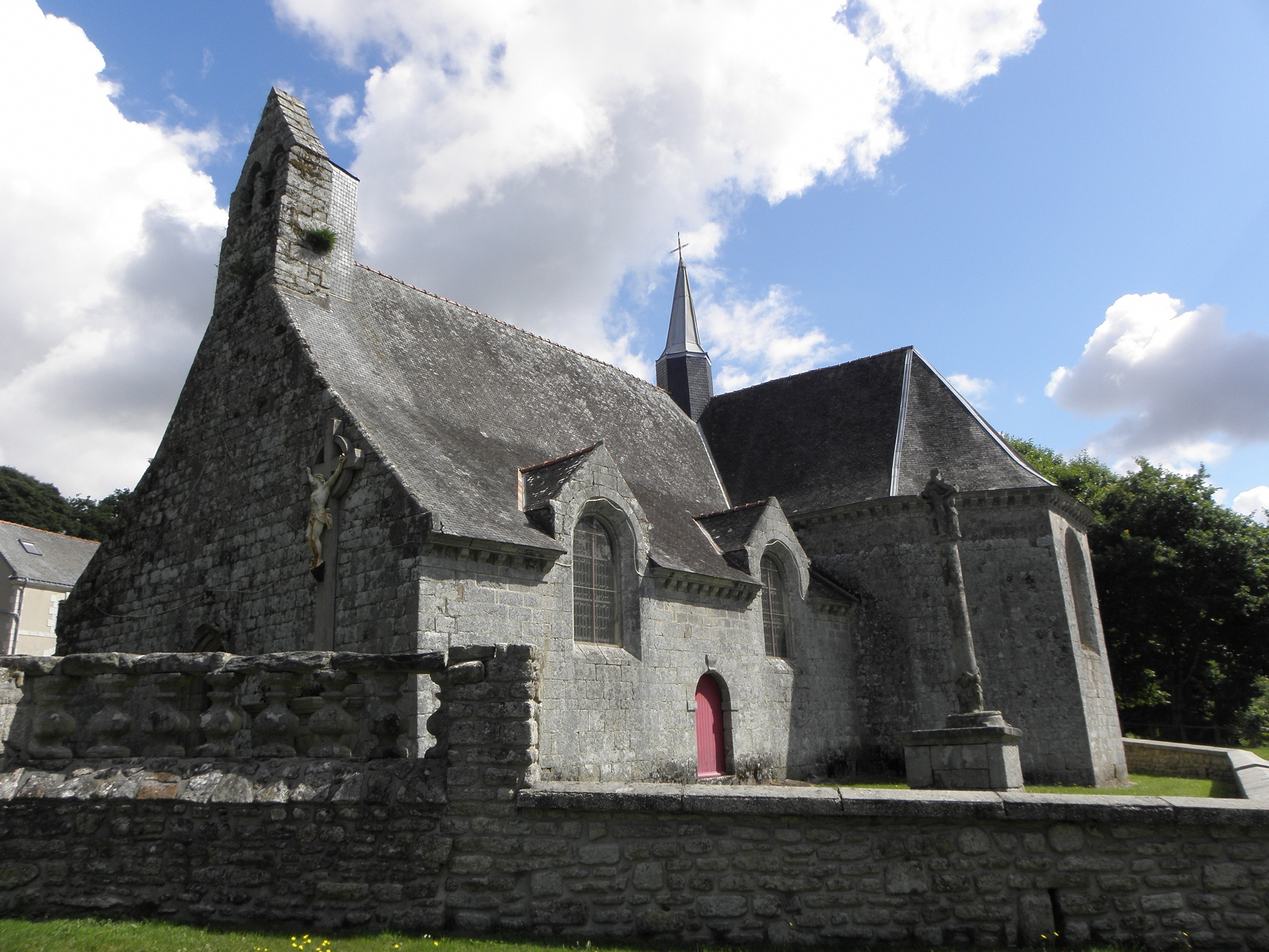
- The parish church in Saint-Caradec-Trégomel
- Location of Saint-Caradec-Trégomel
- Location within France Location within Brittany
- Coordinates: 48°02′18″N 3°21′00″W
- Country: France
- Region: Brittany
- Department: Morbihan
- Arrondissement: Pontivy
- Canton: Gourin
- Intercommunality: Roi Morvan

Government
  - Mayor (2026–32): Marilyn Febvin
- Area^{1}: 16.12 km^{2} (6.22 sq mi)
- Highest elevation: 197 m (646 ft)
- Lowest elevation: 99 m (325 ft)
- Population (2023): 467
  - Density: 29.0/km^{2} (75.0/sq mi)
- Time zone: UTC+01:00 (CET)
  - Summer (DST): UTC+02:00 (CEST)
- INSEE/Postal code: 56210 /56540
- ^{1} French Land Register data, which excludes lakes, ponds, glaciers > 1 km^{2} (0.386 sq mi or 247 acres) and river estuaries.

Saint-Caradec-Trégomel (French pronunciation: [sɛ̃ kaʁadɛk tʁeɡɔmɛl]; Breton: Sant-Karadeg-Tregonvael) is a commune in the Morbihan department of Brittany in north-western France.

== Demographics ==
Inhabitants of Saint-Caradec-Trégomel are called in French Caradocéens.

== Geography ==
Saint-Caradec-Trégomel is border by Le Croisty to the north, by Ploërdut and Lignol to the east, by Kernascléden and Berné to the south and by Priziac to the west. Historically it belongs to Vannetais and Pays Pourlet.

== Map ==
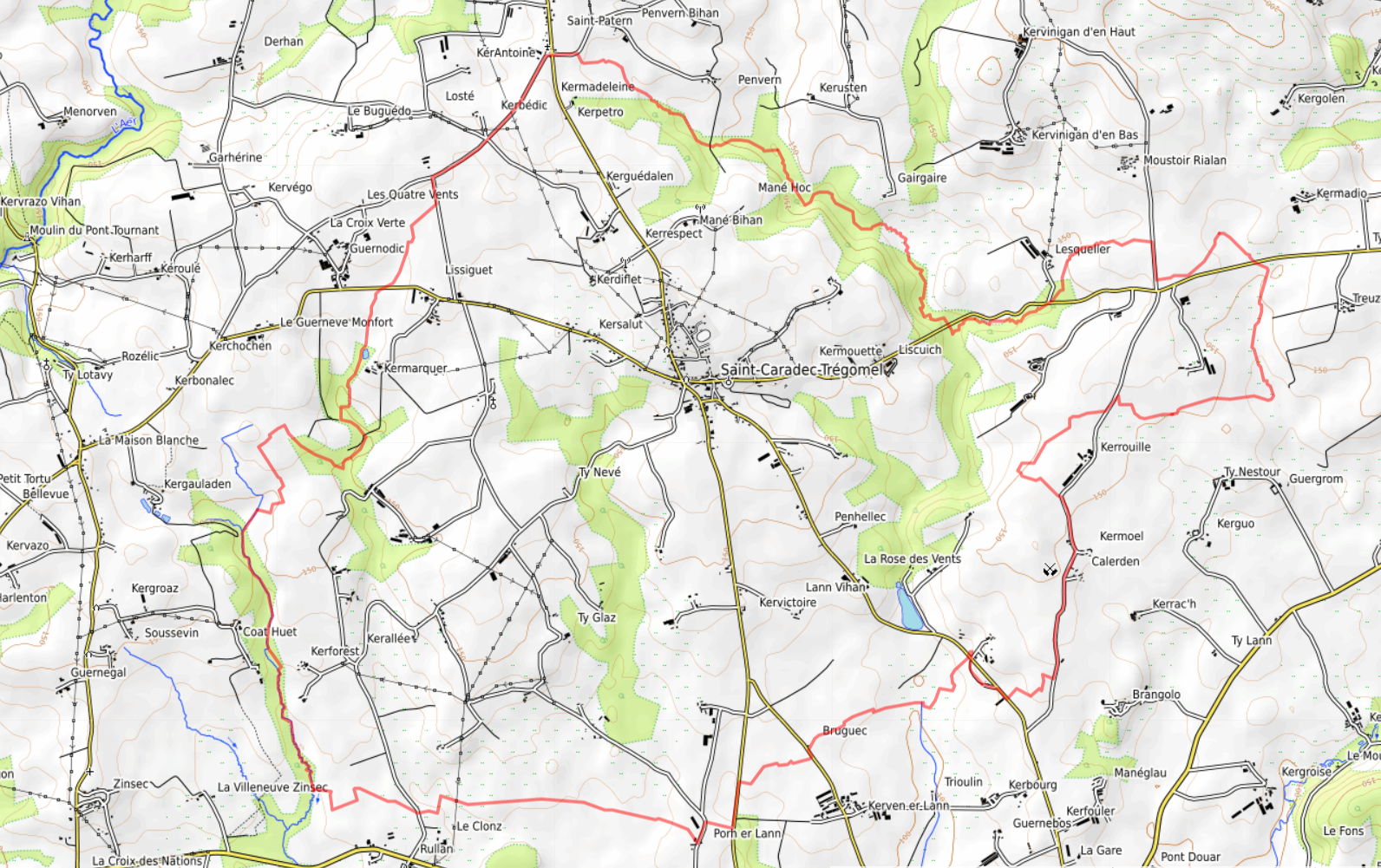
Topographic map

== Gallery ==
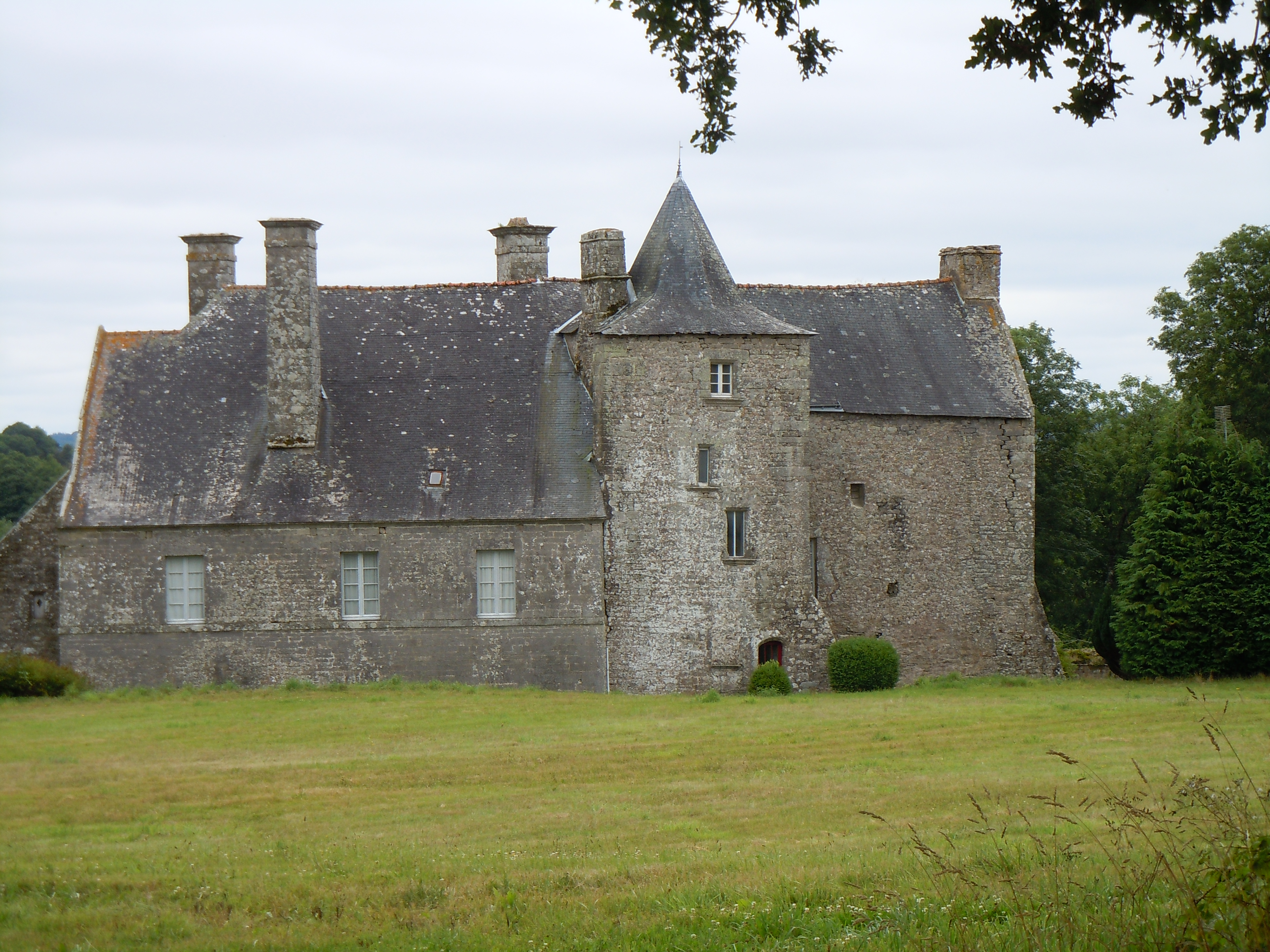
Kermerien castle

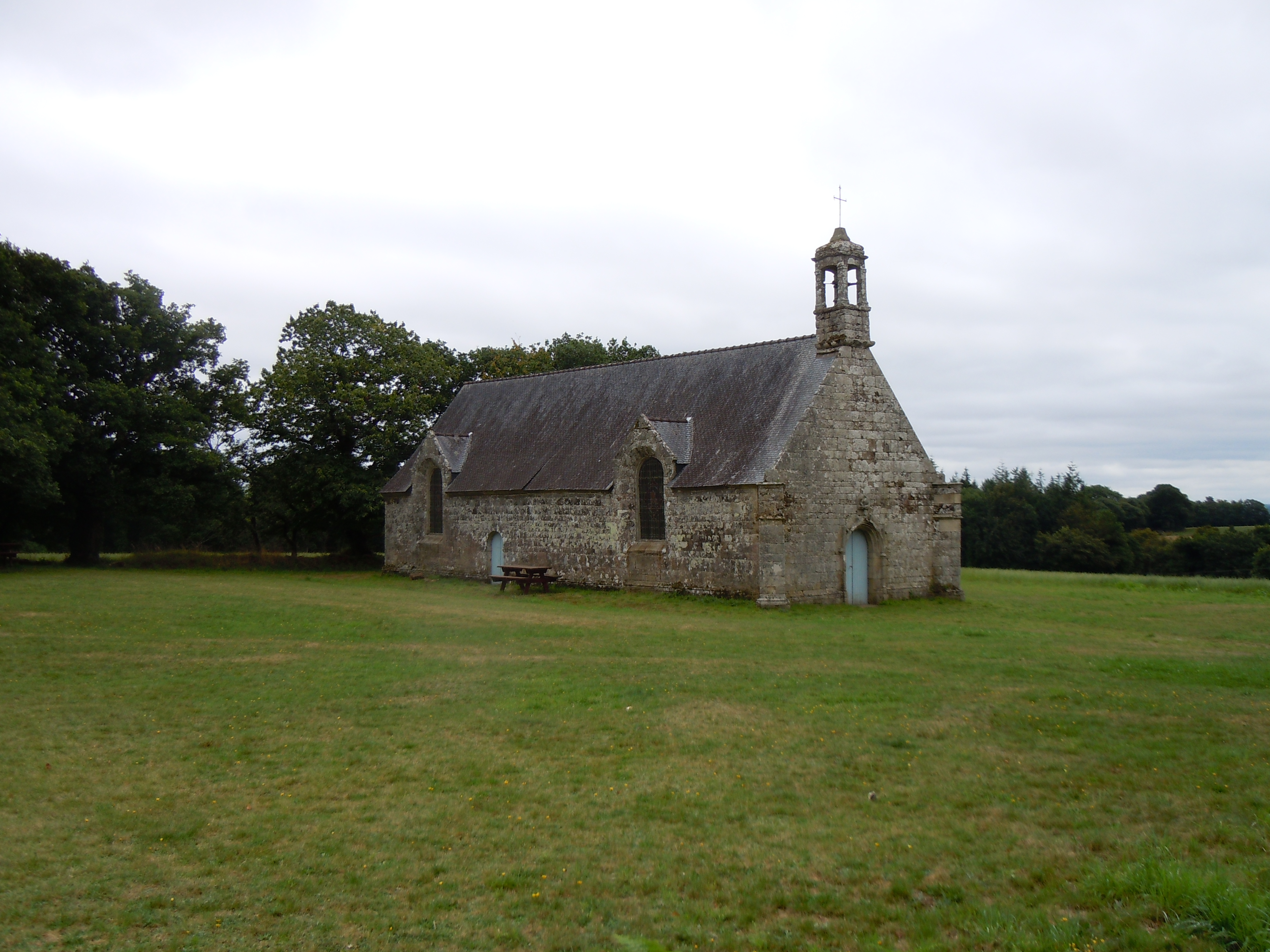
Chapel Saint Cado

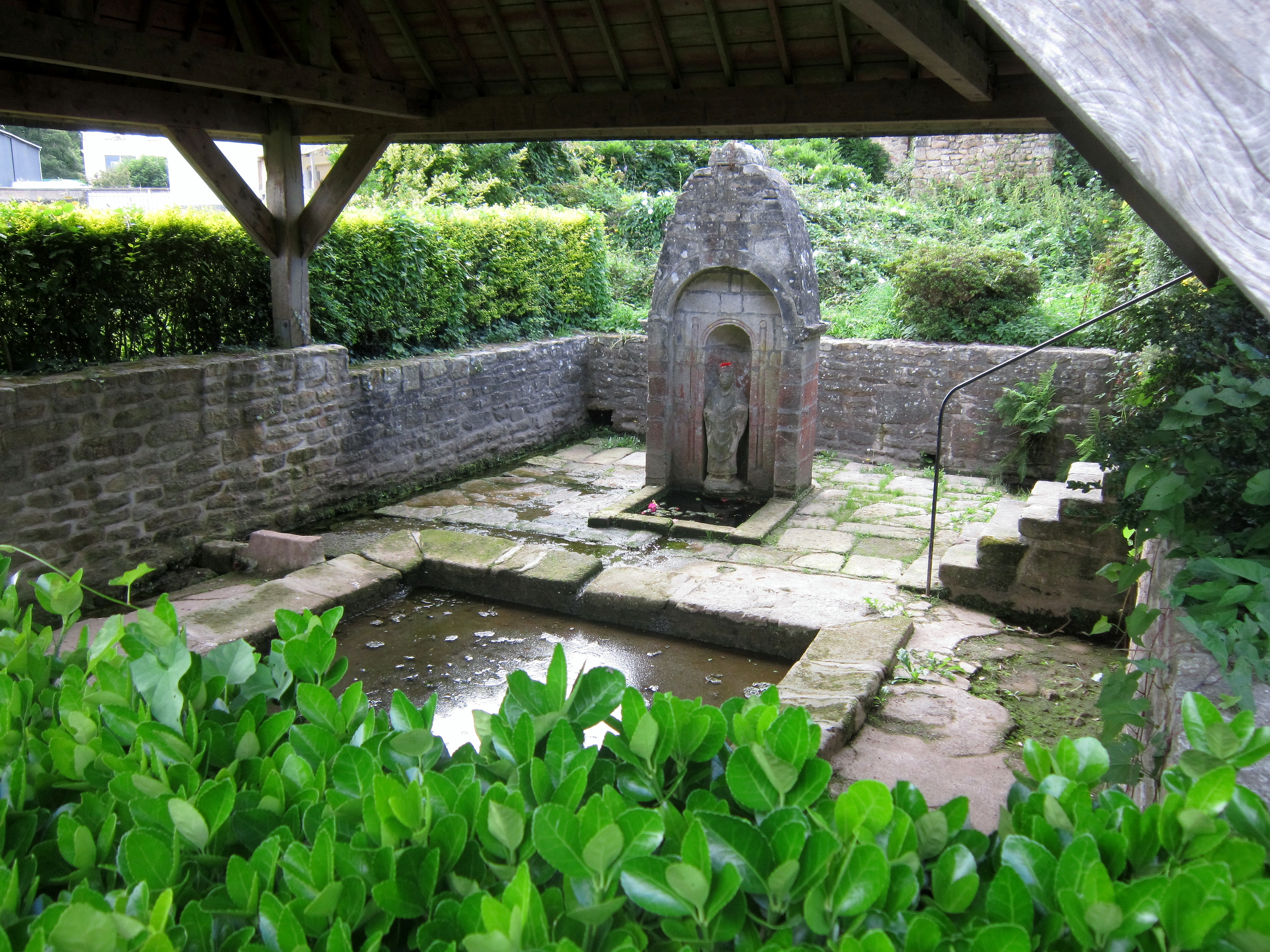
Washing-place in Saint-Caradec

== See also ==
- Communes of the Morbihan department
