= Lignol =

Lignol may refer to:

- Lignol, Morbihan, a commune in France
- Lignol-le-Château, a commune in the Aube department in north-central France
- lignols, or monolignols, a category of polyphenolic compounds, monomers incorporated in lignin
- Lignol Innovations, a company with a pilot plant for cellulosic ethanol commercialization, in Vancouver
