= Neulliac =

Neulliac Neulieg
- Commune
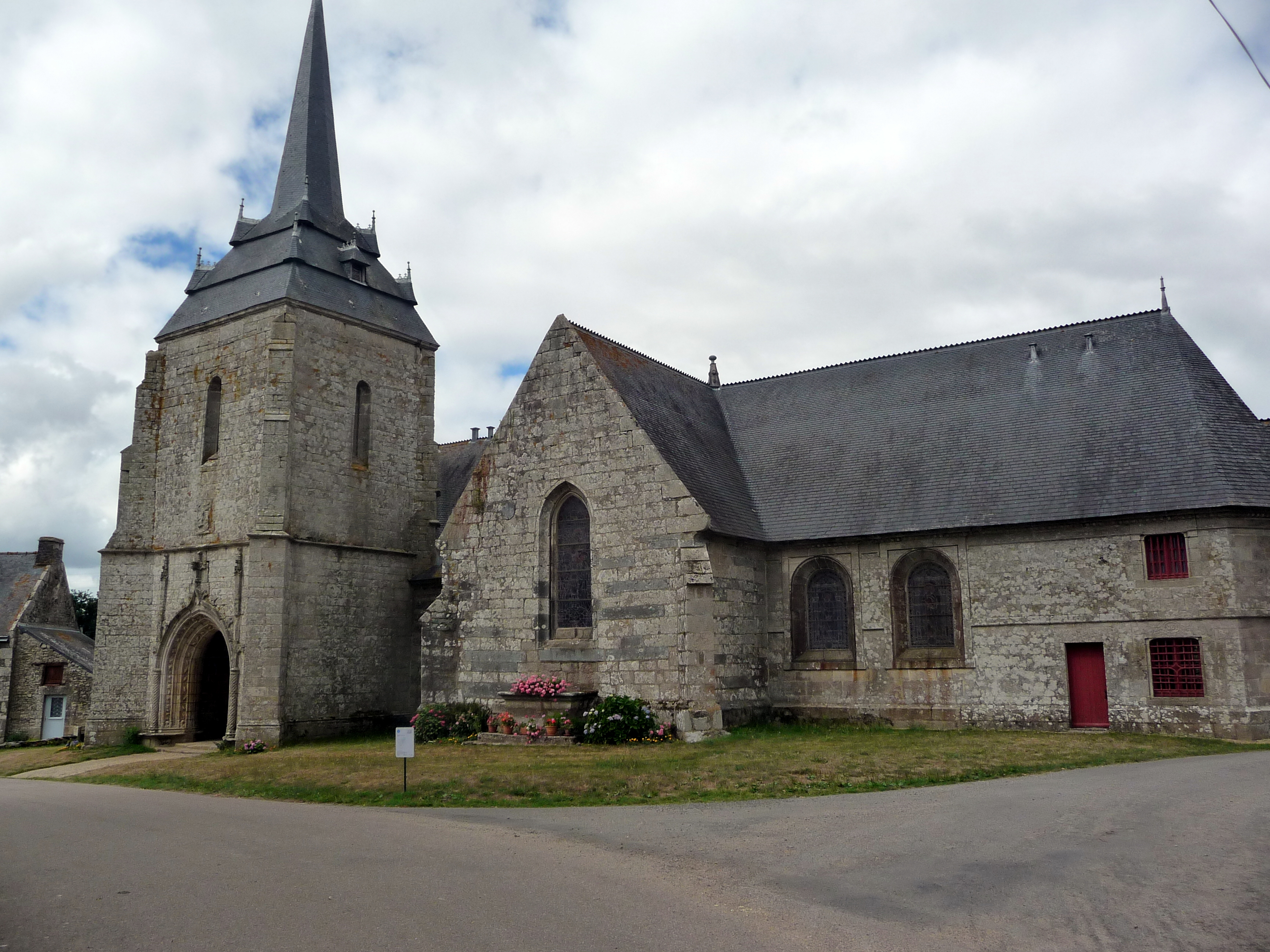
- The Chapel of Our Lady of the Carmelites, in Neulliac

- Coat of arms
- Location of Neulliac
- Location within France Location within Brittany
- Coordinates: 48°07′43″N 2°58′51″W
- Country: France
- Region: Brittany
- Department: Morbihan
- Arrondissement: Pontivy
- Canton: Gourin
- Intercommunality: Pontivy Communauté

Government
  - Mayor (2026–32): Jean-Pierre Le Ponner
- Area^{1}: 30.99 km^{2} (11.97 sq mi)
- Highest elevation: 147 m (482 ft)
- Lowest elevation: 54 m (177 ft)
- Population (2023): 1,482
  - Density: 47.82/km^{2} (123.9/sq mi)
- Time zone: UTC+01:00 (CET)
  - Summer (DST): UTC+02:00 (CEST)
- INSEE/Postal code: 56146 /56300
- ^{1} French Land Register data, which excludes lakes, ponds, glaciers > 1 km^{2} (0.386 sq mi or 247 acres) and river estuaries.

Neulliac (French pronunciation: [nøljak]; Breton: Neulieg) is a commune in the Morbihan department of Brittany in north-western France. Inhabitants of Neulliac are called Neulliacois.

== See also ==
- Communes of the Morbihan department
