= Locmalo =

Commune in Brittany, France

Locmalo Lokmac'hloù
- Commune
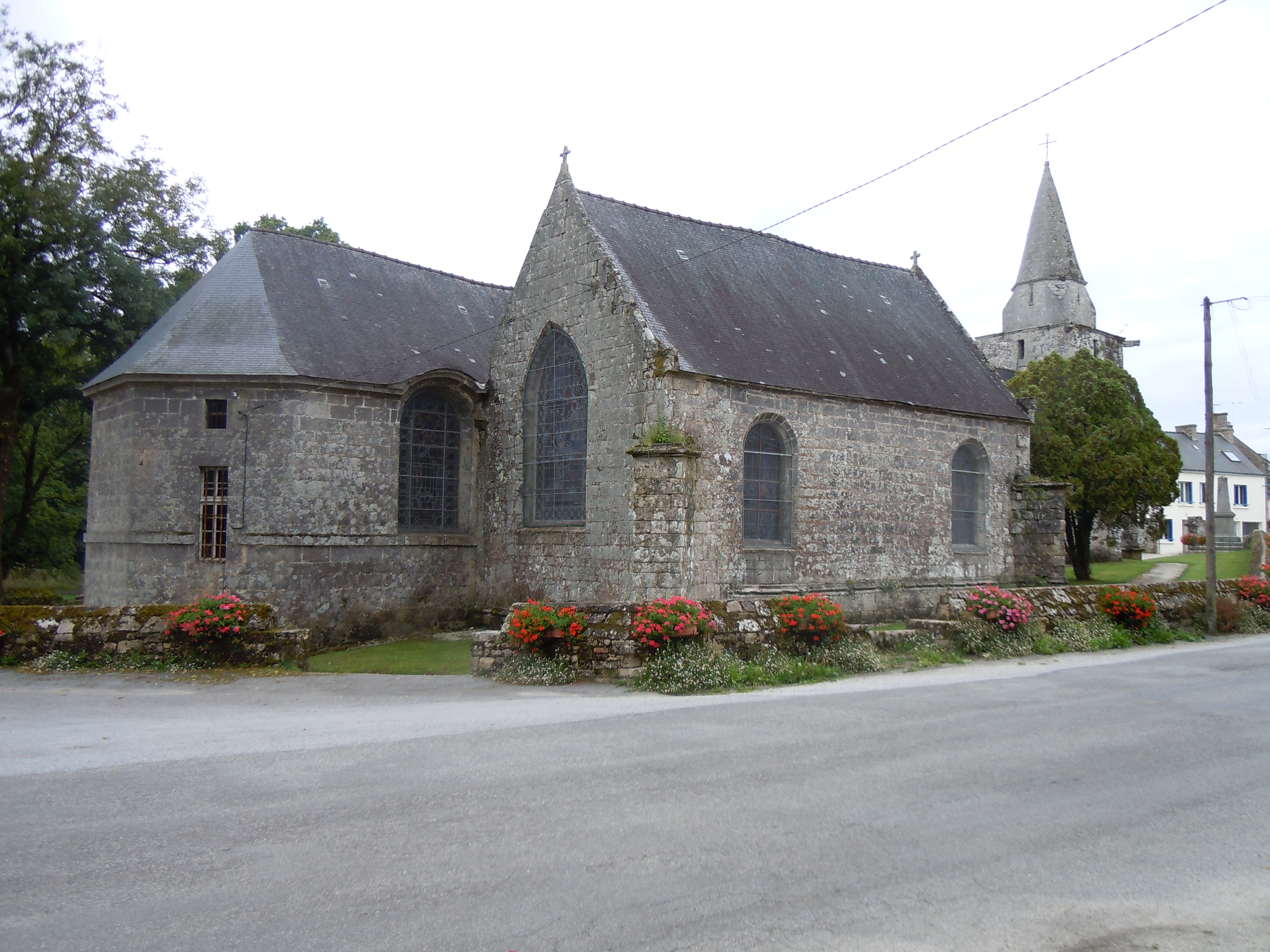
- The parish church in Locmalo
- Location of Locmalo
- Location within France Location within Brittany
- Coordinates: 48°04′24″N 3°11′07″W
- Country: France
- Region: Brittany
- Department: Morbihan
- Arrondissement: Pontivy
- Canton: Gourin
- Intercommunality: Roi Morvan Communauté

Government
  - Mayor (2026–32): Jean-Charles Lohé
- Area^{1}: 23.91 km^{2} (9.23 sq mi)
- Highest elevation: 216 m (709 ft)
- Lowest elevation: 112 m (367 ft)
- Population (2023): 890
  - Density: 37/km^{2} (96/sq mi)
- Time zone: UTC+01:00 (CET)
  - Summer (DST): UTC+02:00 (CEST)
- INSEE/Postal code: 56113 /56160
- ^{1} French Land Register data, which excludes lakes, ponds, glaciers > 1 km^{2} (0.386 sq mi or 247 acres) and river estuaries.

Locmalo (French pronunciation: [lɔkmalo]; Breton: Lokmac'hloù) is a commune in the Morbihan department of Brittany in north-western France. Inhabitants of Locmalo are called in French Locmalois.

== Toponymy ==
From the Breton loc which means hermitage (cf.: Locminé) and 'malo' which derive from Saint Malo.

== Map ==
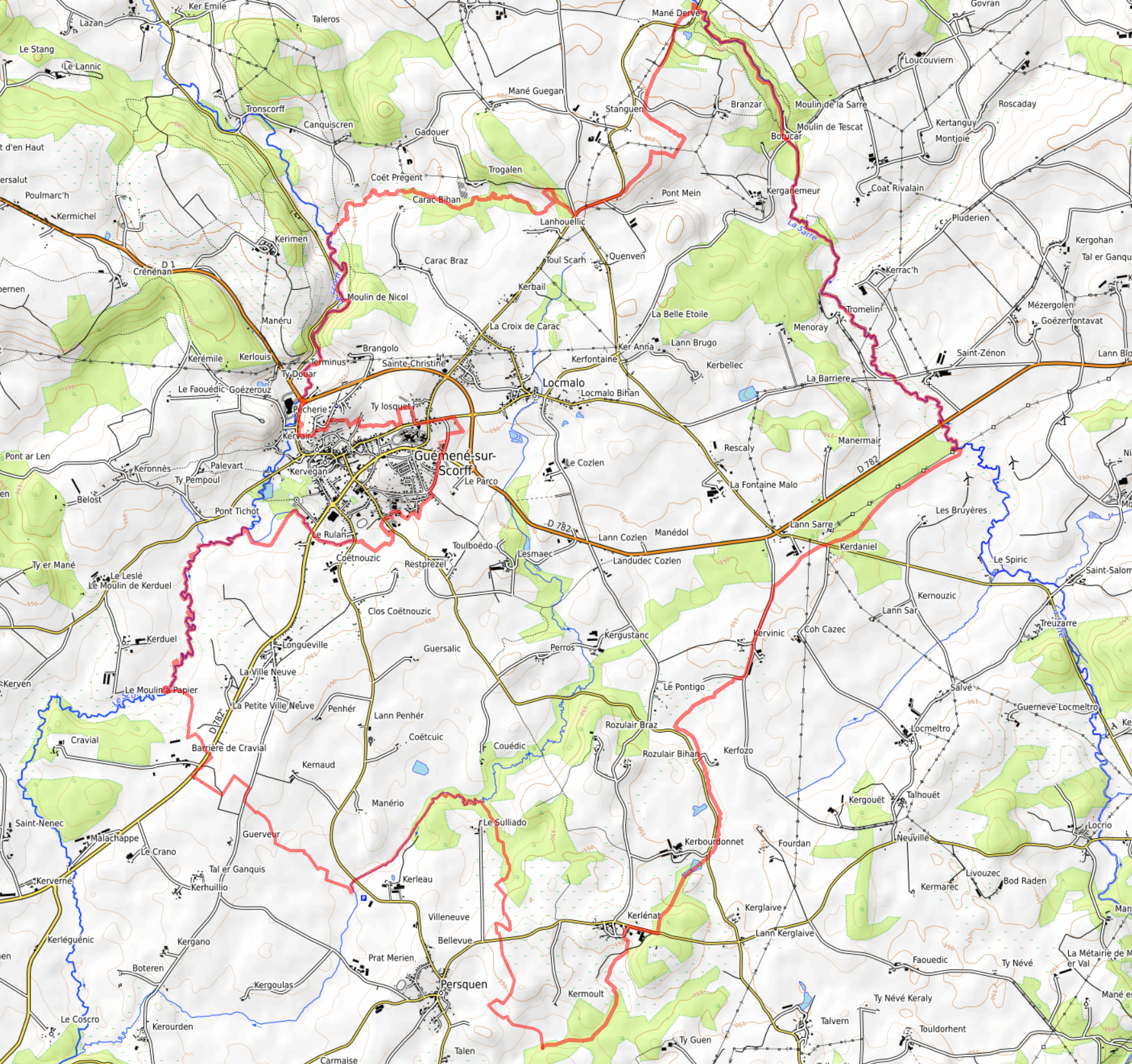
Topographic map

== Gallery ==
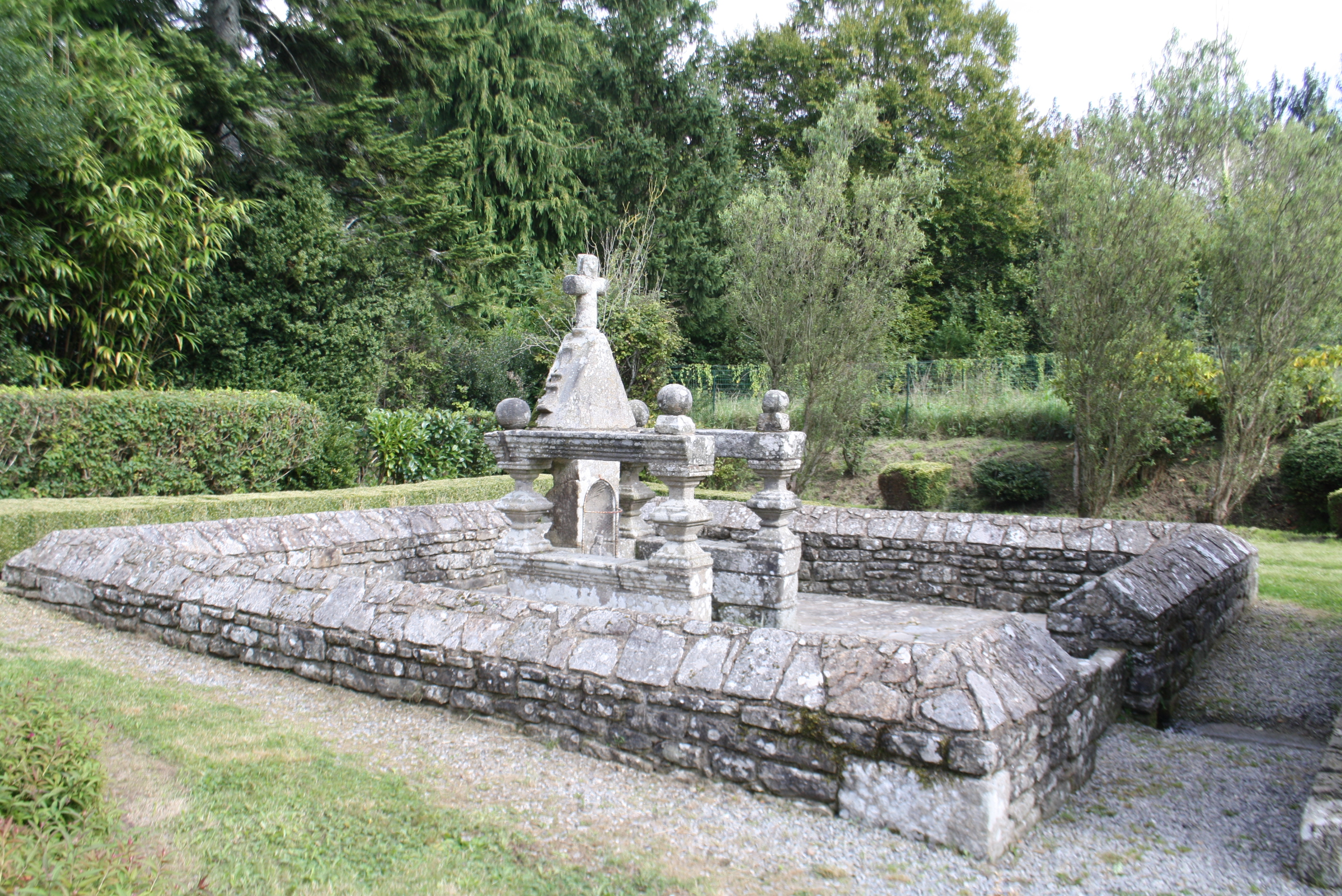
Fountain of Longueville.

== See also ==
- Communes of the Morbihan department
