= Canton of Gourin =

Coordinates: 48.14°N 3.61°W

The canton of Gourin is an administrative division of the Morbihan department, northwestern France. Its borders were modified at the French canton reorganisation which came into effect in March 2015. Its seat is in Gourin.

It consists of the following communes:

1. Berné
2. Cléguérec
3. Le Croisty
4. Le Faouët
5. Gourin
6. Guémené-sur-Scorff
7. Guiscriff
8. Kergrist
9. Kernascléden
10. Langoëlan
11. Langonnet
12. Lanvénégen
13. Lignol
14. Locmalo
15. Malguénac
16. Meslan
17. Neulliac
18. Persquen
19. Ploërdut
20. Plouray
21. Priziac
22. Roudouallec
23. Le Saint
24. Saint-Aignan
25. Saint-Caradec-Trégomel
26. Sainte-Brigitte
27. Saint-Tugdual
28. Séglien
29. Silfiac
