= Kergrist =

Commune in Brittany, France

- Commune
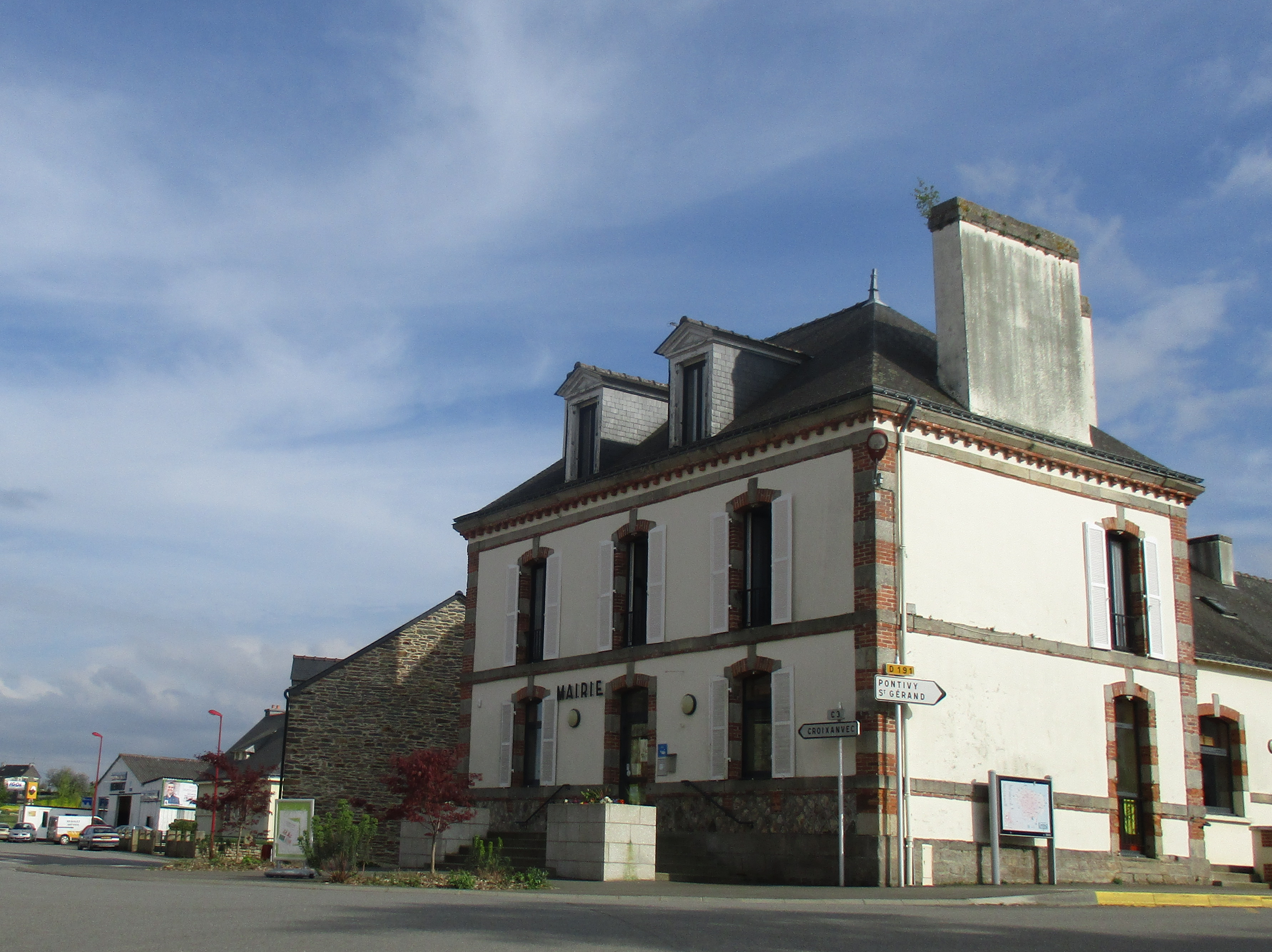
- Town hall.
- Location of Kergrist
- Location within France Location within Brittany
- Coordinates: 48°08′50″N 2°57′17″W
- Country: France
- Region: Brittany
- Department: Morbihan
- Arrondissement: Pontivy
- Canton: Gourin
- Intercommunality: Pontivy Communauté

Government
  - Mayor (2026–32): Arnaud David
- Area^{1}: 29.66 km^{2} (11.45 sq mi)
- Highest elevation: 166 m (545 ft)
- Lowest elevation: 79 m (259 ft)
- Population (2023): 714
  - Density: 24.1/km^{2} (62.3/sq mi)
- Time zone: UTC+01:00 (CET)
  - Summer (DST): UTC+02:00 (CEST)
- INSEE/Postal code: 56093 /56300
- ^{1} French Land Register data, which excludes lakes, ponds, glaciers > 1 km^{2} (0.386 sq mi or 247 acres) and river estuaries.

Kergrist (French pronunciation: [kɛʁɡʁist]; Breton: Kergrist) is a commune in the Morbihan department of Brittany in north-western France. Inhabitants of Kergrist are called Kergristois.

== See also ==
- Communes of the Morbihan department
