= Persquen =

Persquen Persken
- Commune
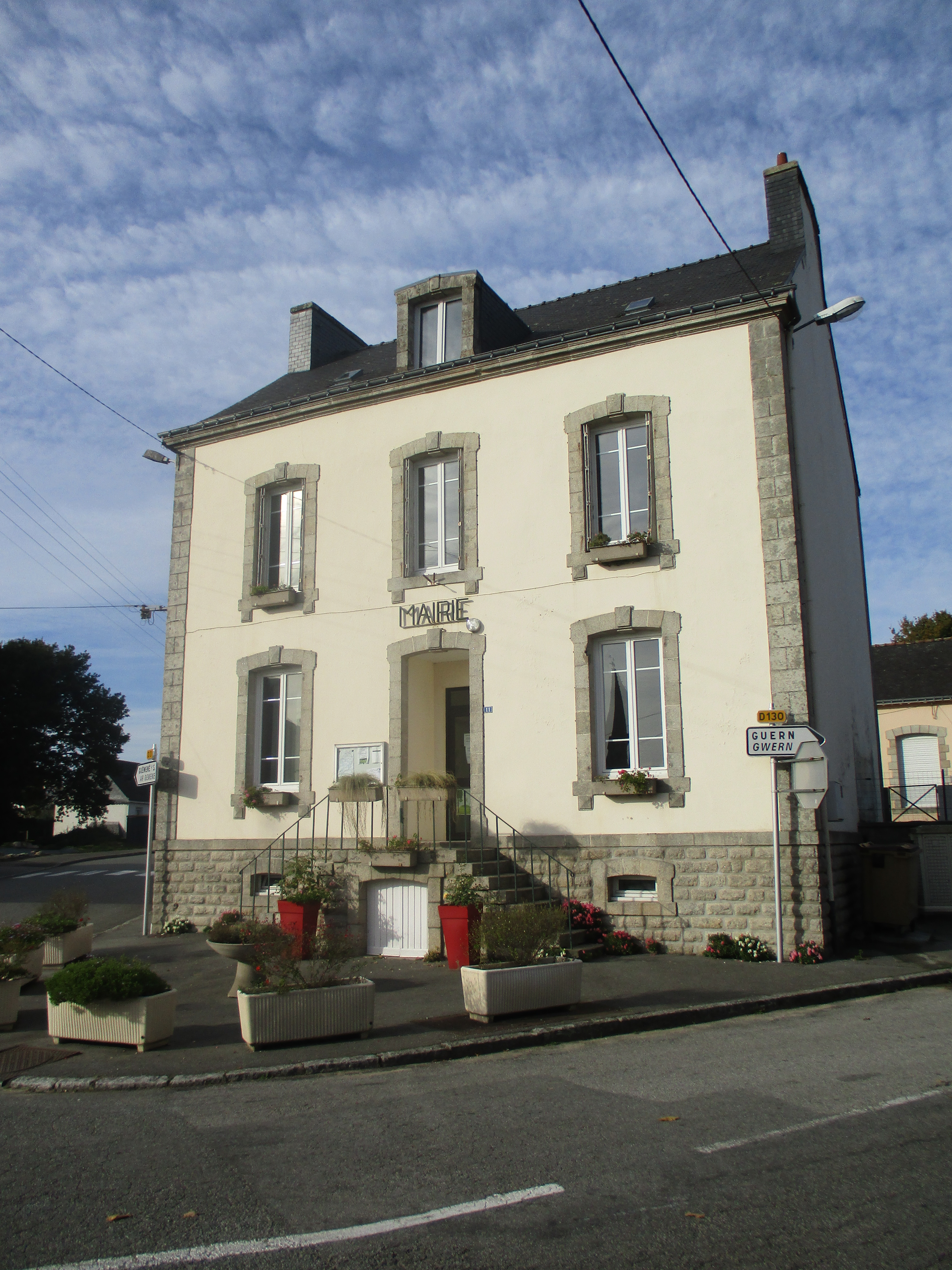
- Town hall
- Location of Persquen
- Location within France Location within Brittany
- Coordinates: 48°01′50″N 3°11′43″W
- Country: France
- Region: Brittany
- Department: Morbihan
- Arrondissement: Pontivy
- Canton: Gourin
- Intercommunality: Roi Morvan Communauté

Government
  - Mayor (2026–32): Myriam Chenais
- Area^{1}: 19.96 km^{2} (7.71 sq mi)
- Highest elevation: 173 m (568 ft)
- Lowest elevation: 107 m (351 ft)
- Population (2023): 365
  - Density: 18.3/km^{2} (47.4/sq mi)
- Time zone: UTC+01:00 (CET)
  - Summer (DST): UTC+02:00 (CEST)
- INSEE/Postal code: 56156 /56160
- ^{1} French Land Register data, which excludes lakes, ponds, glaciers > 1 km^{2} (0.386 sq mi or 247 acres) and river estuaries.

Persquen (French pronunciation: [pɛʁskɛn]; Breton: Persken) is a commune in the Morbihan department of Brittany in north-western France. Inhabitants of Persquen are called in French Persquennois.

== Geography ==
Persquen is located south of Guémené-sur-Scorff. The river Scorff forms part of the commune's northern border. Historically, the village belongs to Vannetais and Pays Pourlet.

== Map ==
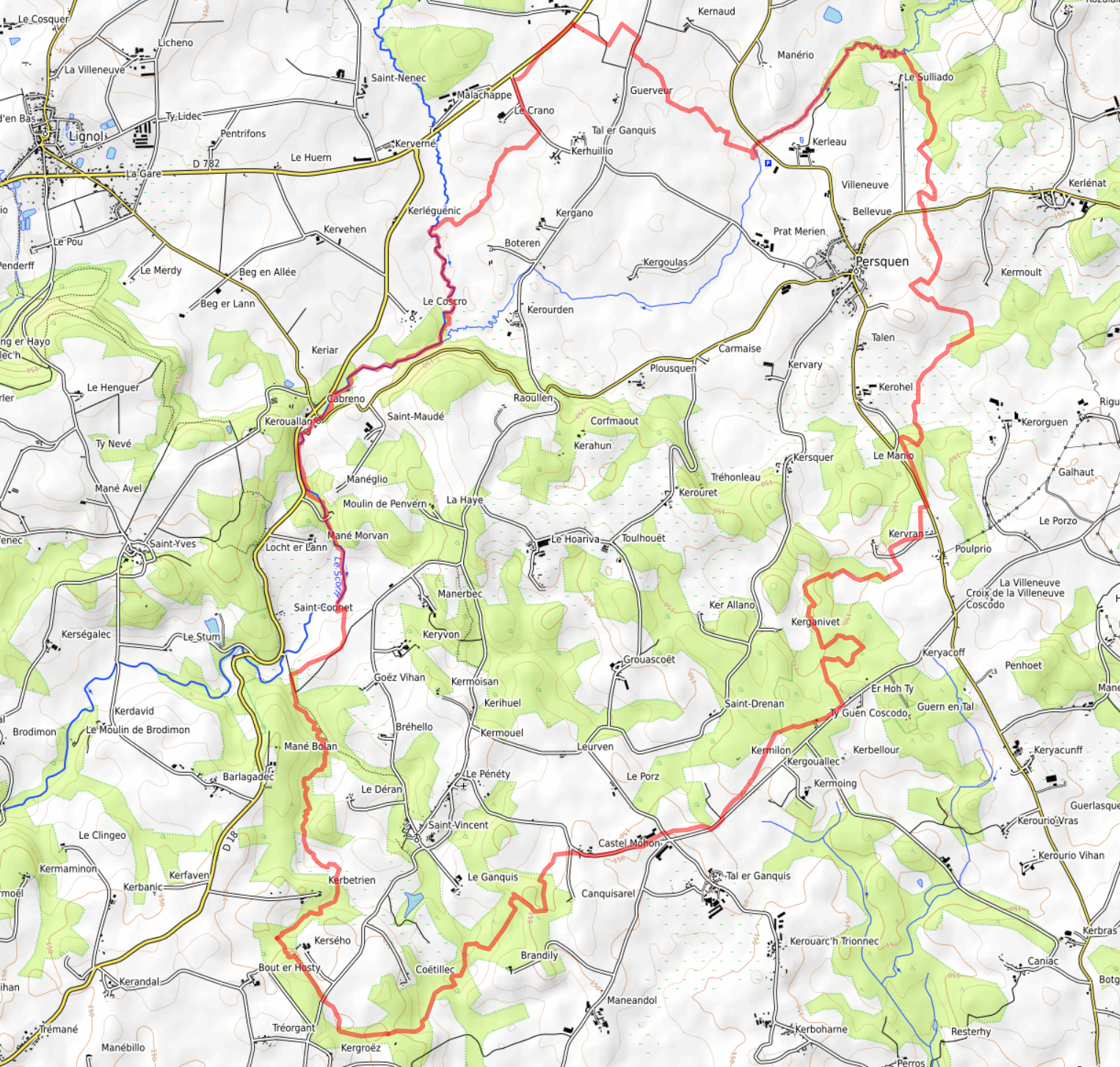
Topographic map

== See also ==
- Communes of the Morbihan department
