= Sainte-Brigitte =

Sainte-Brigitte Berc'hed
- Commune
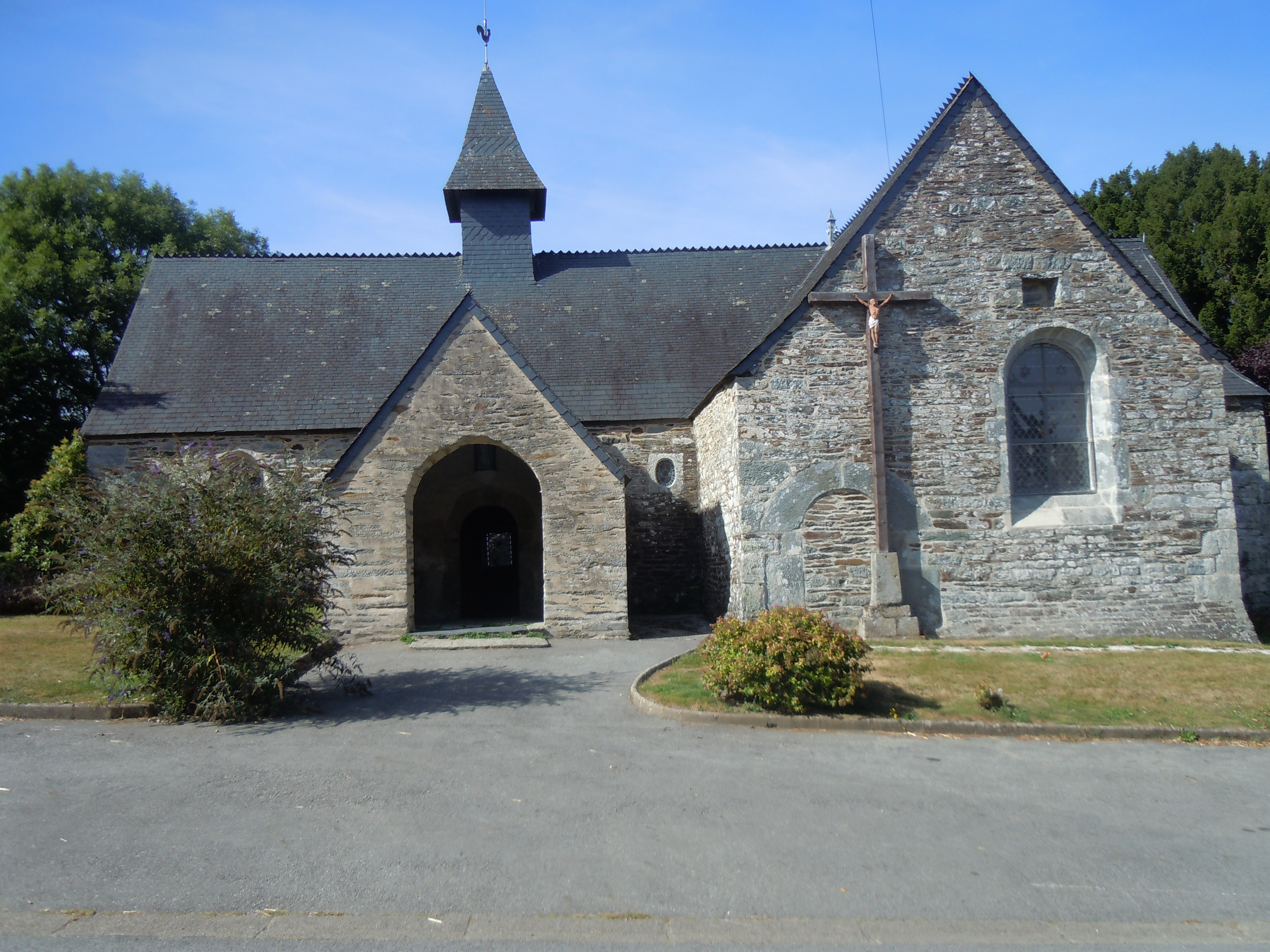
- The church in Sainte-Brigitte

- Coat of arms
- Location of Sainte-Brigitte
- Location within France Location within Brittany
- Coordinates: 48°09′48″N 3°07′40″W
- Country: France
- Region: Brittany
- Department: Morbihan
- Arrondissement: Pontivy
- Canton: Gourin
- Intercommunality: Pontivy Communauté

Government
  - Mayor (2026–32): Anne Le Borgne
- Area^{1}: 17.74 km^{2} (6.85 sq mi)
- Highest elevation: 286 m (938 ft)
- Lowest elevation: 120 m (390 ft)
- Population (2023): 178
  - Density: 10.0/km^{2} (26.0/sq mi)
- Time zone: UTC+01:00 (CET)
  - Summer (DST): UTC+02:00 (CEST)
- INSEE/Postal code: 56209 /56480
- ^{1} French Land Register data, which excludes lakes, ponds, glaciers > 1 km^{2} (0.386 sq mi or 247 acres) and river estuaries.

Sainte-Brigitte (French pronunciation: [sɛ̃t bʁiʒit]; Breton: Berc'hed) is a commune in the Morbihan department of Brittany in north-western France.

== Population ==
Inhabitants of Sainte-Brigitte are called in French Brigittois. The population declined quickly after the first world war. The population is steady since 1982.

Historical population

Year	Pop.	±% p.a.
1793	791	—
1800	672	−2.30%
1806	655	−0.43%
1821	729	+0.72%
1831	743	+0.19%
1836	787	+1.16%
1841	758	−0.75%
1846	813	+1.41%
1851	765	−1.21%
1856	700	−1.76%
1861	700	+0.00%
1866	747	+1.31%
1872	632	−2.75%
1876	684	+2.00%
1881	665	−0.56%
1886	675	+0.30%
1891	640	−1.06%
1896	657	+0.53%
1901	628	−0.90%

Year	Pop.	±% p.a.
1906	646	+0.57%
1911	666	+0.61%
1921	648	−0.27%
1926	634	−0.44%
1931	553	−2.70%
1936	505	−1.80%
1946	453	−1.08%
1954	357	−2.93%
1962	320	−1.36%
1968	237	−4.88%
1975	195	−2.75%
1982	186	−0.67%
1990	141	−3.40%
1999	166	+1.83%
2007	158	−0.62%
2012	172	+1.71%
2017	177	+0.57%
2023	178	+0.09%

Source: EHESS and INSEE (1968-2023)

== Geography ==
The village centre is located 15 km (9.3 mi) northeast of Pontivy and 62 km (39 mi) north of Vannes. The village is situated at the heart of a hilly and forest-covered region called the Forest of Quenecan.

== Map ==
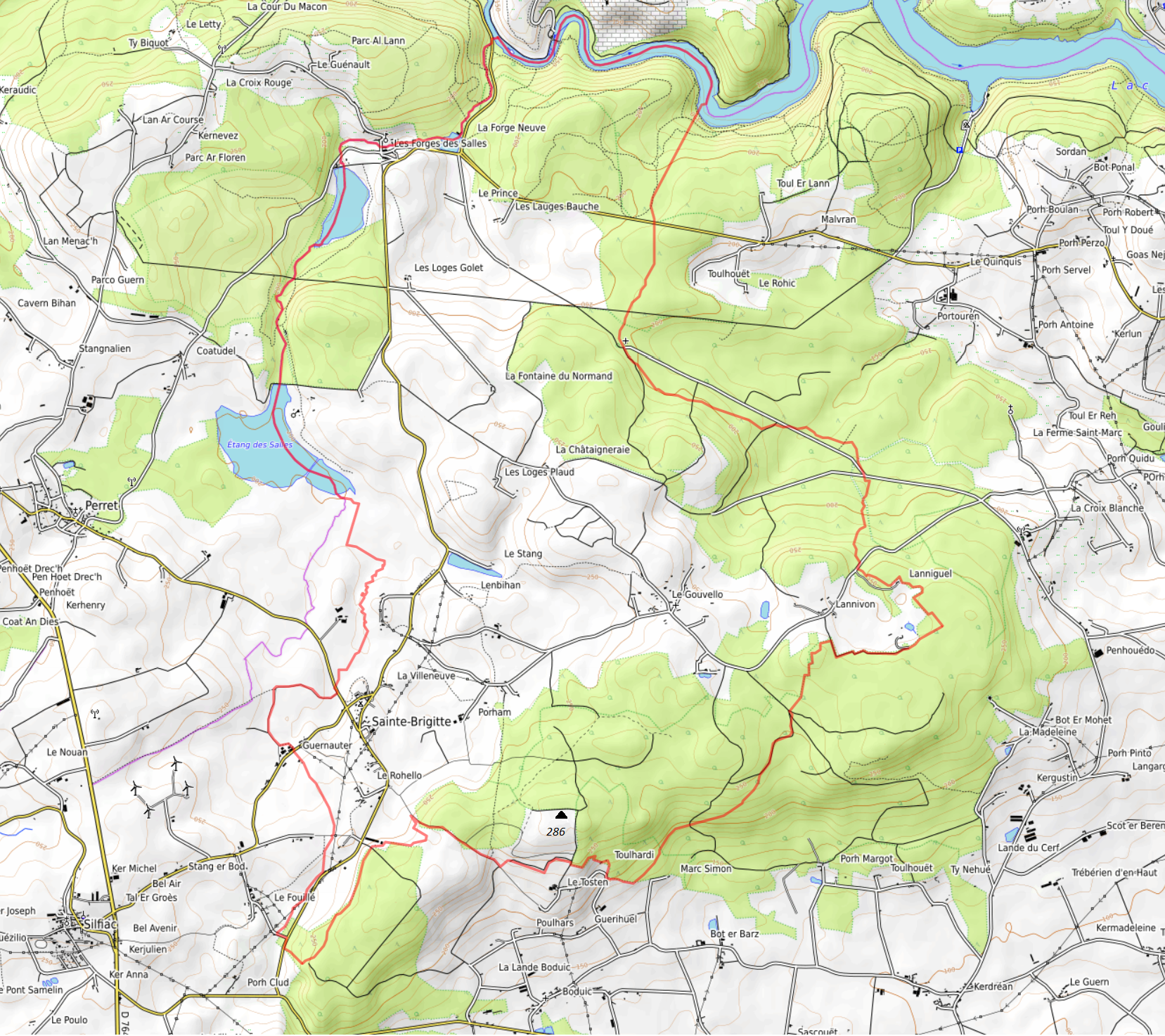
Topographic map

== History ==
The main activity in the village was the forges in the last centuries. The activity declined quickly at the end of the nineteenth century and the forges closed in 1880.

== Gallery ==
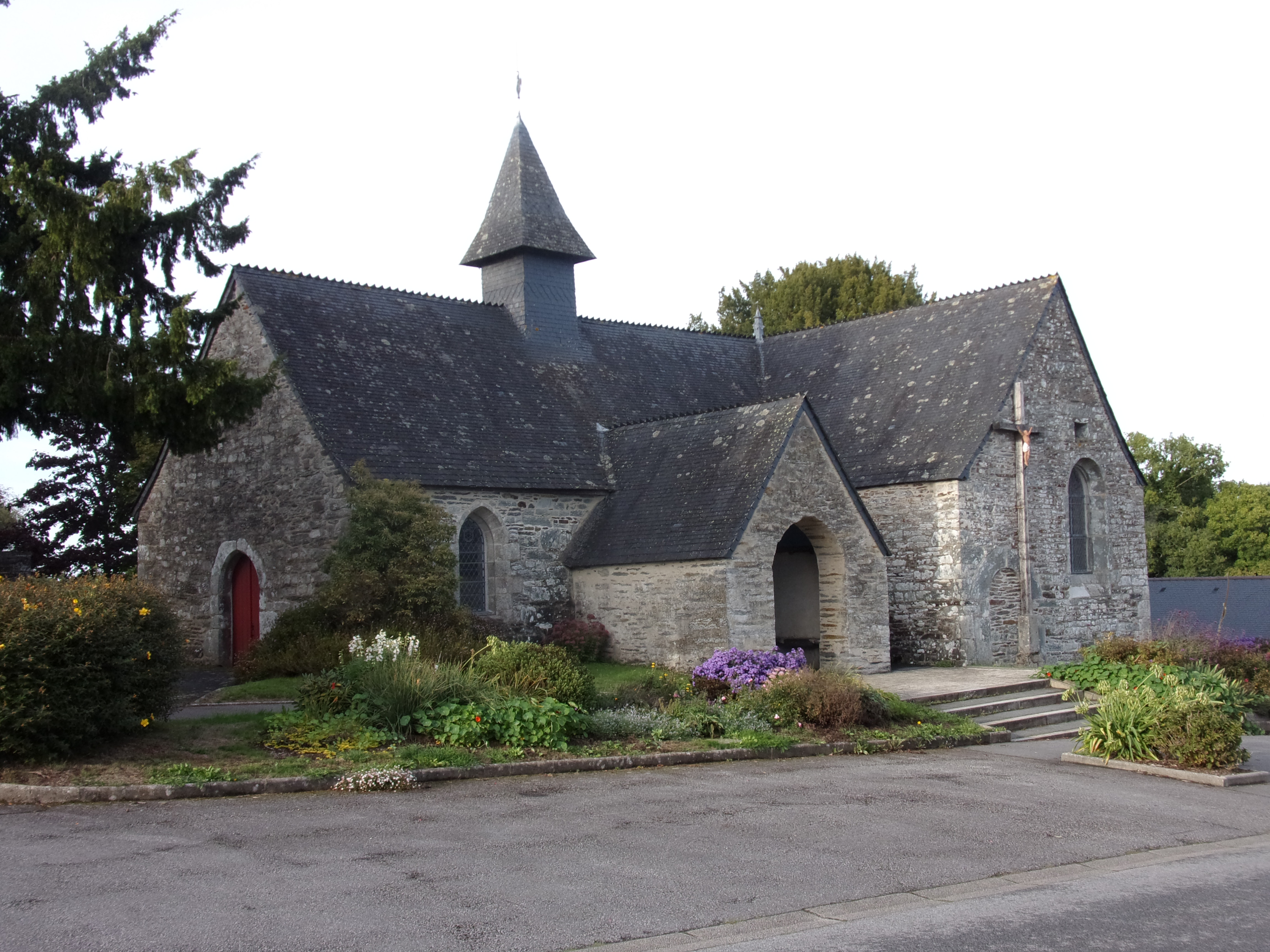
The parish church.

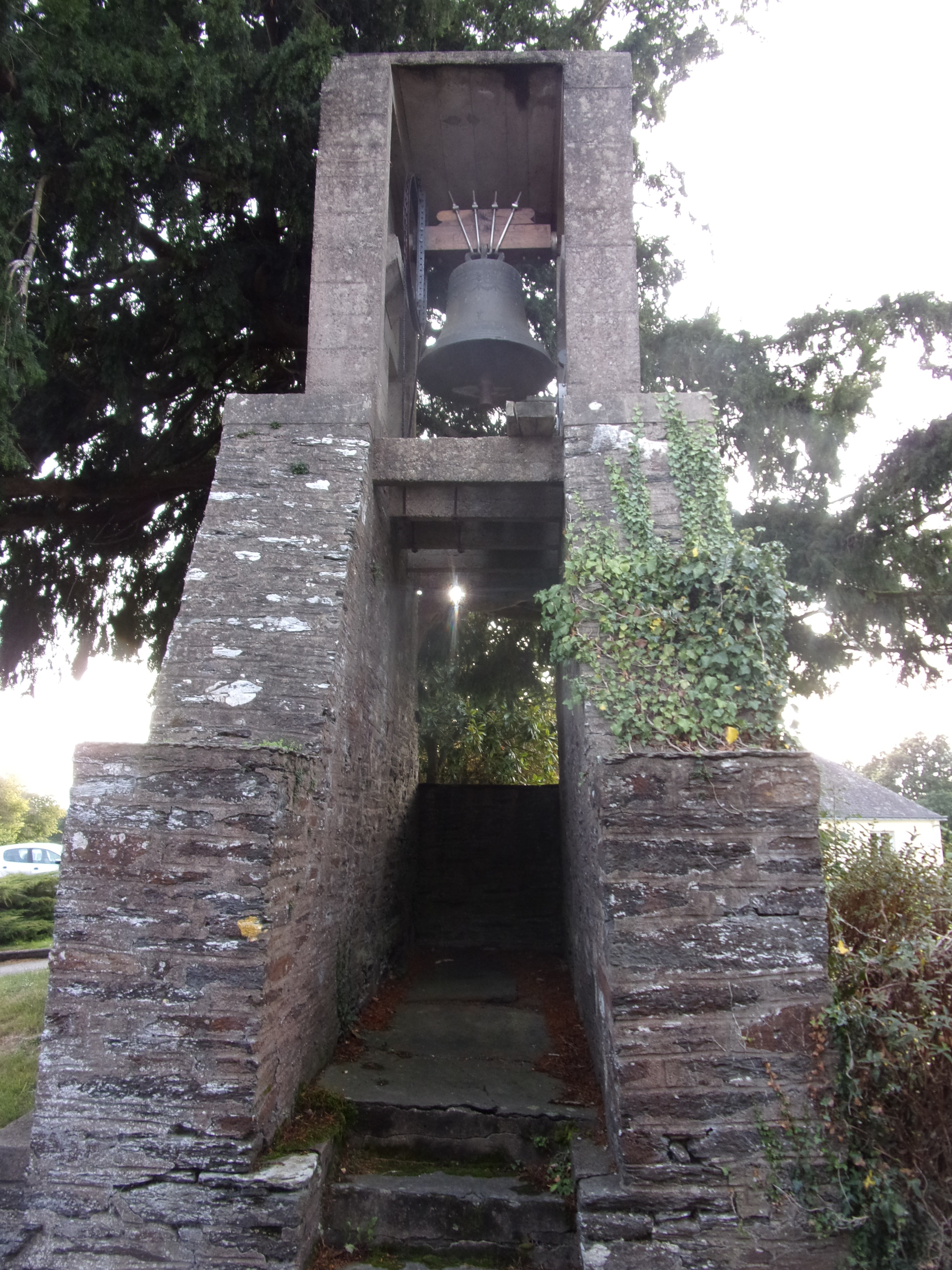
The bell of the church

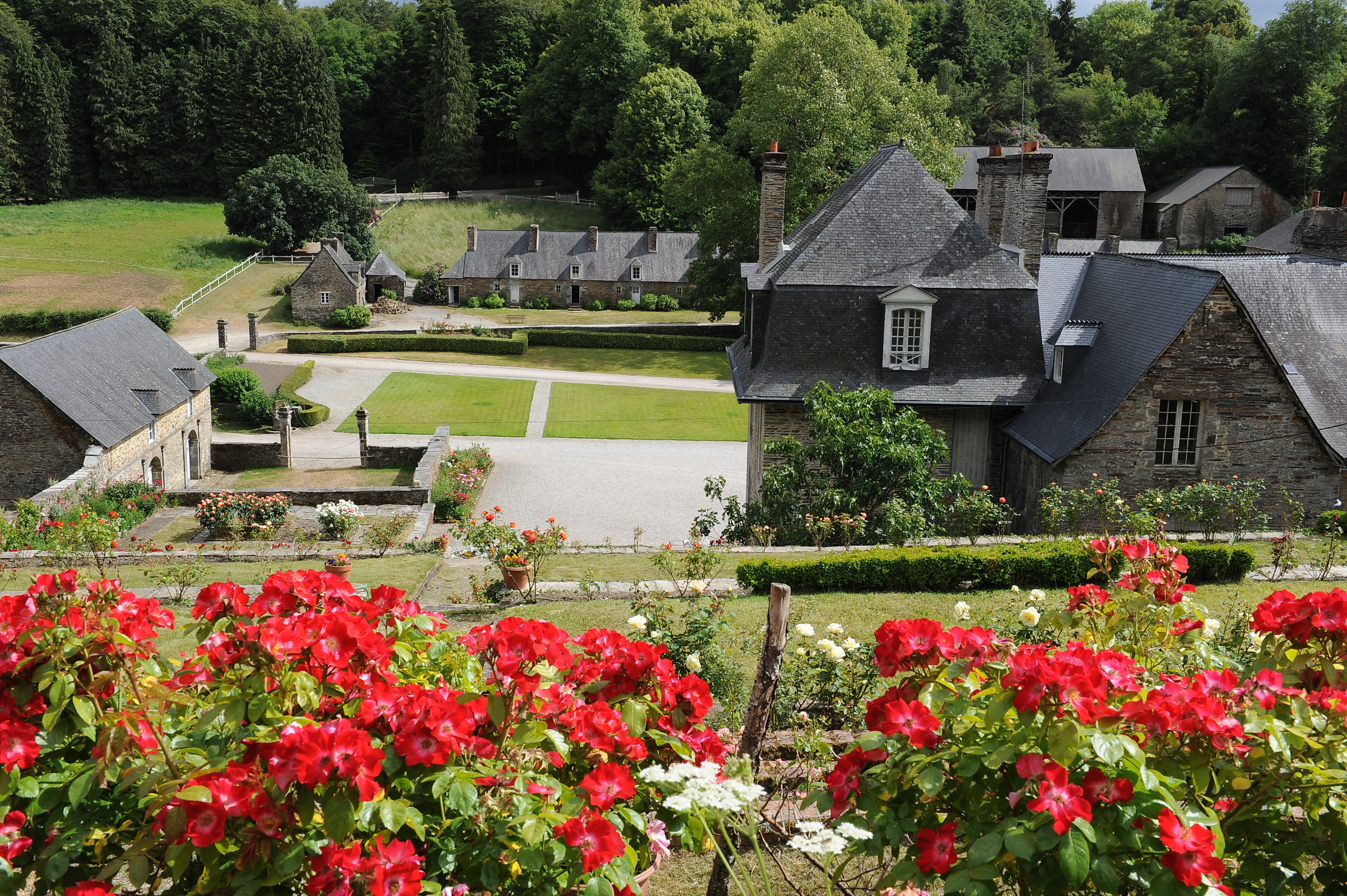
General view of the village of Les Forges des Salles

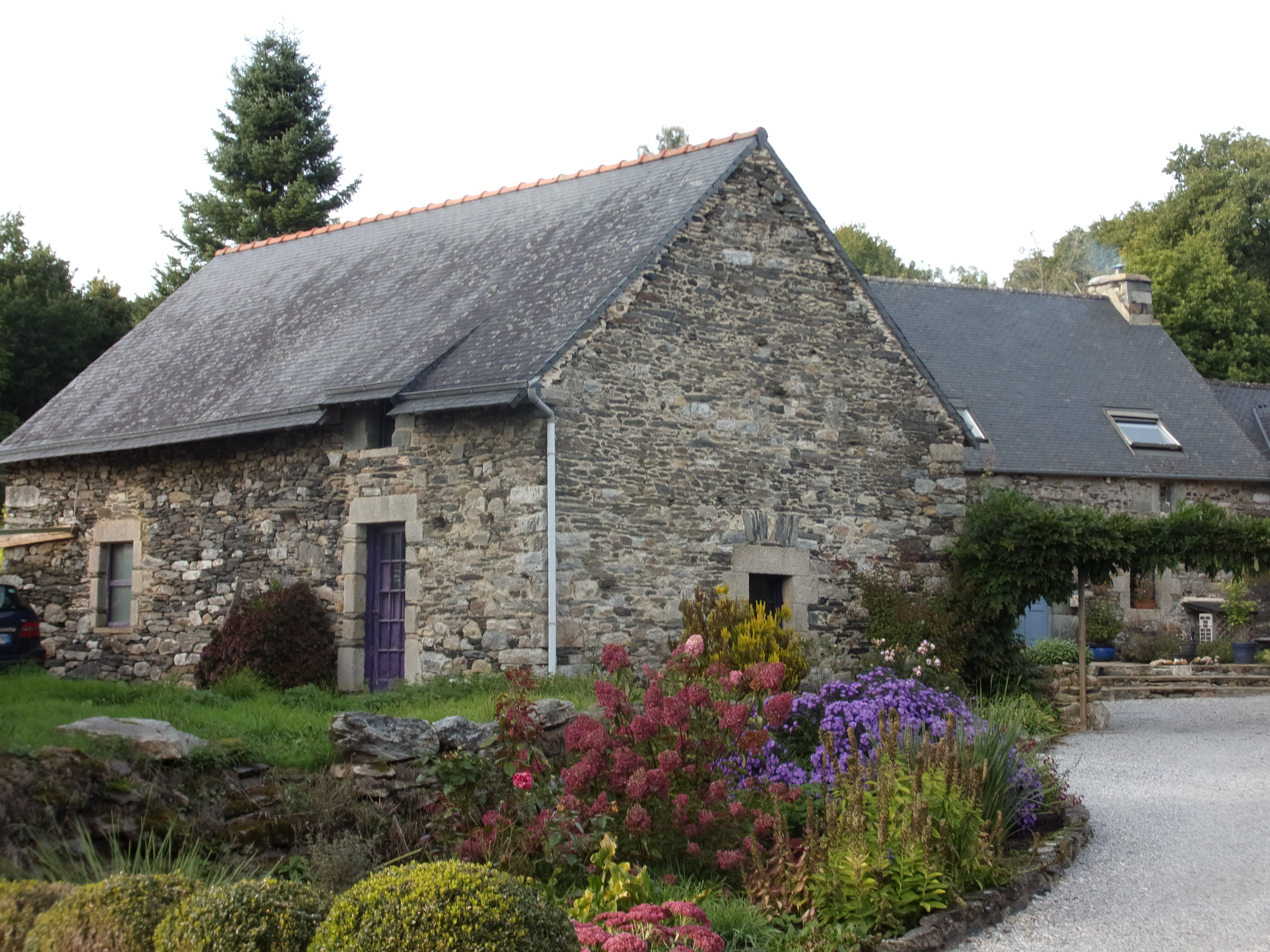
Cottages in the village of Le Gouvello

== See also ==
- Communes of the Morbihan department
