= Berné =

Commune in Brittany, France

Berné Berne
- Commune
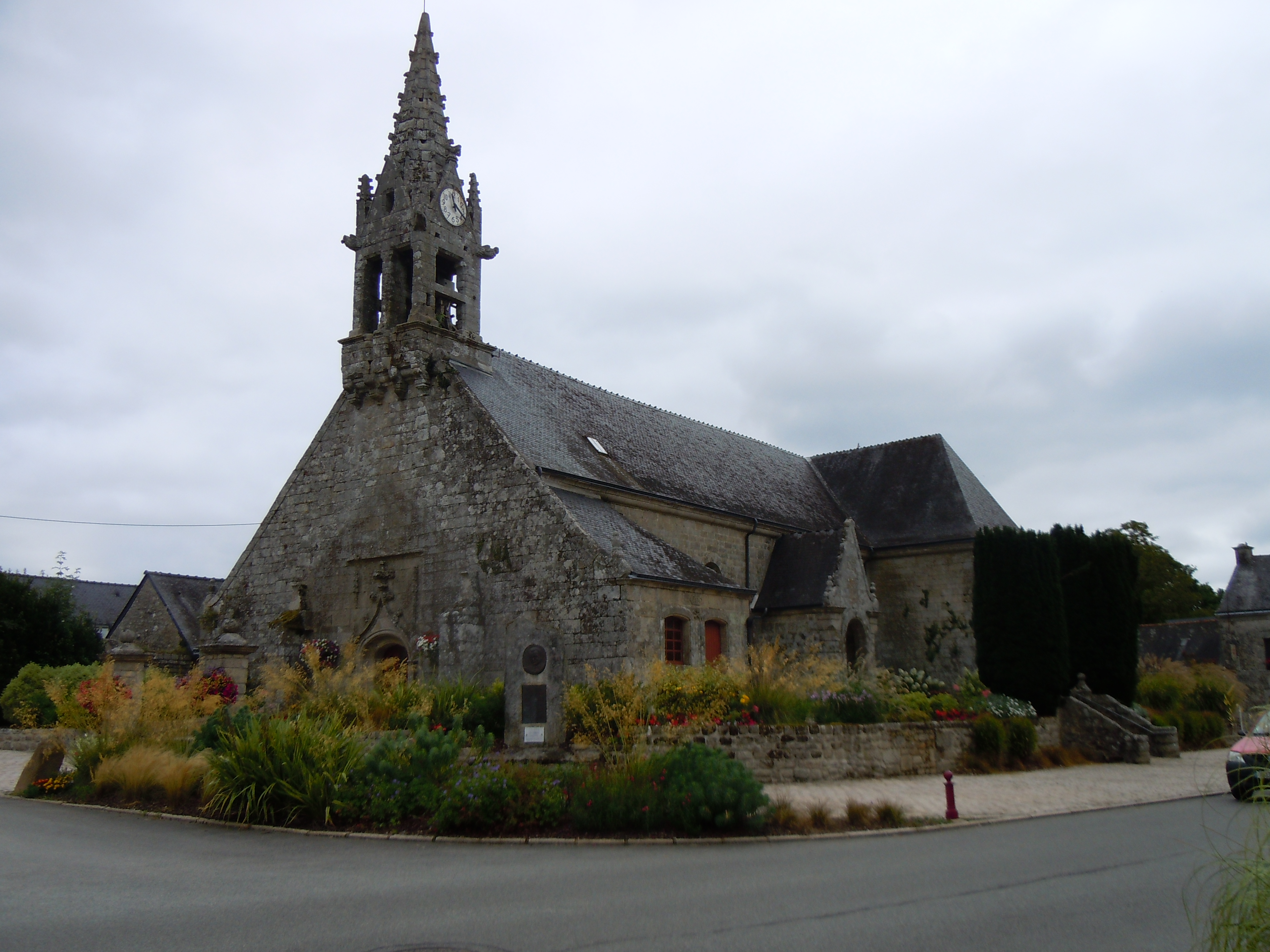
- The parish church in Berné
- Location of Berné
- Location within France Location within Brittany
- Coordinates: 47°59′44″N 3°23′28″W
- Country: France
- Region: Brittany
- Department: Morbihan
- Arrondissement: Pontivy
- Canton: Gourin
- Intercommunality: Roi Morvan Communauté

Government
  - Mayor (2026–32): David Guilloux
- Area^{1}: 34.77 km^{2} (13.42 sq mi)
- Highest elevation: 166 m (545 ft)
- Lowest elevation: 36 m (118 ft)
- Population (2023): 1,551
  - Density: 44.61/km^{2} (115.5/sq mi)
- Time zone: UTC+01:00 (CET)
  - Summer (DST): UTC+02:00 (CEST)
- INSEE/Postal code: 56014 /56240
- ^{1} French Land Register data, which excludes lakes, ponds, glaciers > 1 km^{2} (0.386 sq mi or 247 acres) and river estuaries.

Berné (French pronunciation: [bɛʁne]; Berne in Breton) is a commune in the Morbihan department in Brittany in northwestern France.

== Population ==
Inhabitants of Berné are called Bernéens in French.

Historical population

Year	Pop.	±% p.a.
1793	1,751	—
1800	1,764	+0.11%
1806	1,773	+0.08%
1821	2,022	+0.88%
1831	2,668	+2.81%
1836	2,210	−3.70%
1841	1,876	−3.22%
1846	1,959	+0.87%
1851	1,941	−0.18%
1856	1,711	−2.49%
1861	1,766	+0.63%
1866	1,863	+1.08%
1872	1,777	−0.78%
1876	1,912	+1.85%
1881	1,984	+0.74%
1886	1,886	−1.01%
1891	1,904	+0.19%
1896	1,953	+0.51%
1901	1,930	−0.24%

Year	Pop.	±% p.a.
1906	1,953	+0.24%
1911	2,030	+0.78%
1921	1,993	−0.18%
1926	1,989	−0.04%
1931	1,918	−0.72%
1936	1,897	−0.22%
1946	1,968	+0.37%
1954	1,804	−1.08%
1962	1,685	−0.85%
1968	1,592	−0.94%
1975	1,508	−0.77%
1982	1,425	−0.81%
1990	1,350	−0.67%
1999	1,316	−0.28%
2007	1,386	+0.65%
2012	1,551	+2.28%
2017	1,531	−0.26%
2023	1,551	+0.22%

Source: EHESS and INSEE (1968-2023)

== Geography ==
Berné is located in the western part of Morbihan, 28 km (17 mi) north of Lorient, 32 km (20 mi) west of Pontivy and 40 km (25 mi) northwest of Vannes. The commune is wooded and hilly. The forest of Pontcallec cover a large part of the commune's area. The river Scorff forms the commune's eastern and southern borders.

== Map ==
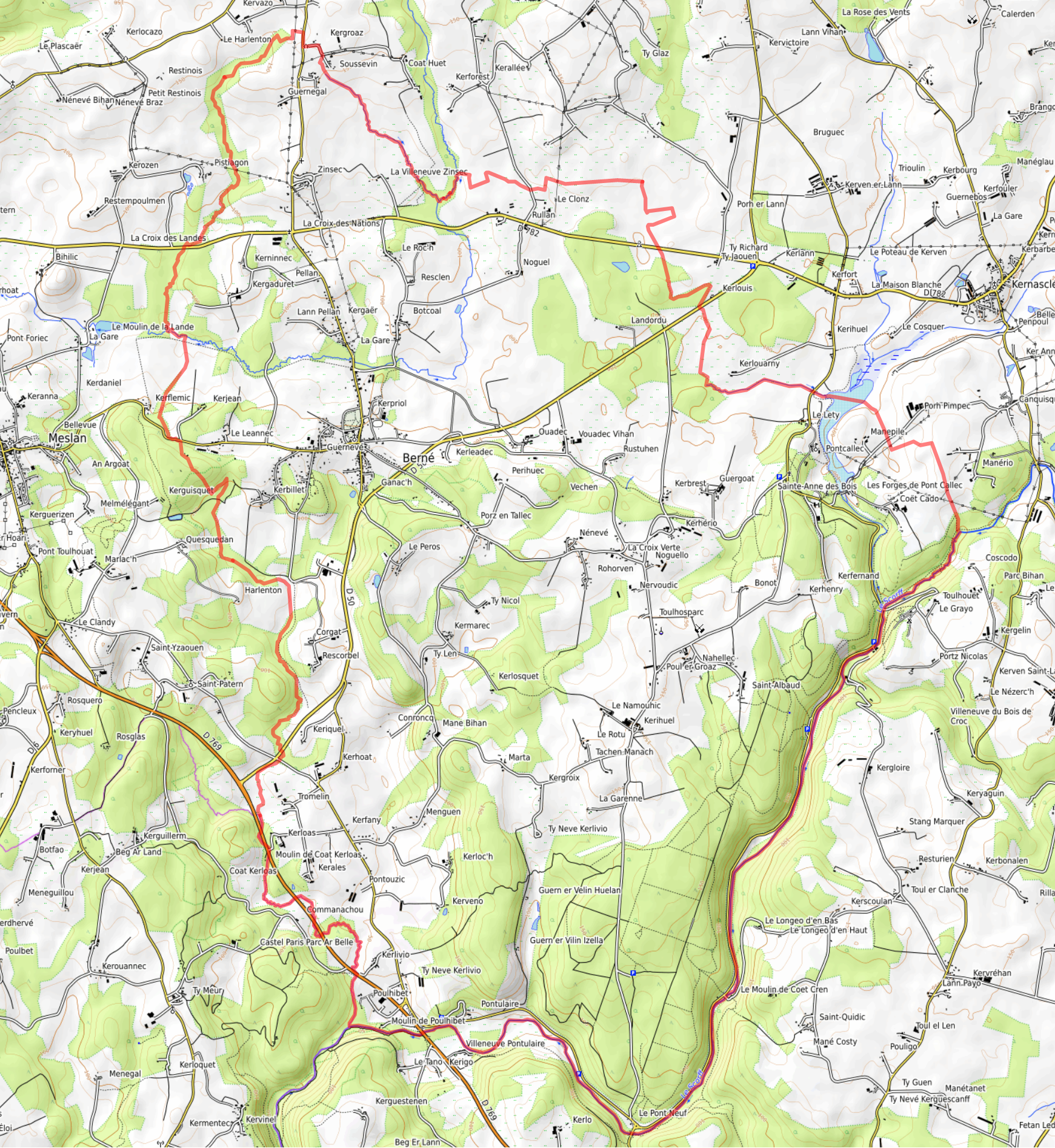
Topographic map

== History ==
=== Second world war ===
Seventeen French resistance fighters were shot dead by the German soldiers in the Landordu wood. Some victims were buried alive. Their bodies were exhumed on 6 July 1944.

== List of places ==
- Bel Air
- Bois du Crocq
- Bonot
- Botcoal
- Castel Bouille
- Château de Pontcallec
- Clonze, le
- Coadic Noguel
- Coat Cren
- Coët Cado
- Corgat
- Corroncq, le
- Cosquer
- Croix des Nations, la
- Croix Verte, la
- Foloben
- Forges, les
- Ganach
- Gare, la
- Garenne, la
- Guergoat
- Guernalgout
- Guernegal
- Guernemoulin
- Guernevé
- Keralès
- Keravel
- Kerbillet
- Kerbrest
- Kerfany
- Kerfernand
- Kergaduret
- Kergal
- Kergroise
- Kerham
- Kerharff
- Kerhenry
- Kerhério
- Kerhoat
- Kerihuel
- Keriquel
- Kerjean
- Kerléadec
- Kerlivio
- Kerloc
- Kerloise
- Kerlosquet
- Kermarrec
- Kerninnec
- Kerpriol
- Kersivy
- Kerveno
- Kerybois
- Lan Pellan
- Landordu
- Leannec, le
- Léty, le
- Leurven
- Manébihan
- Manépile
- Marta, le
- Mengleu
- Menguen
- Moulin de Corroncq
- Moulin de Kerlous
- Moulin de Poulhibet
- Nahellec
- Namouhic
- Nénévé, le
- Nervoudic
- Noguel
- Noguello
- Ouadec Vihan
- Ouadec Vras
- Pellan
- Perihuec
- Péros, le
- Pont Bellec
- Pont Callec
- Pont Neuf, le
- Pont Zinsec
- Pontouzic
- Pontulaire
- Portz en Tallec
- Poulgroix
- Poulhibet
- Prat er Gazec
- Resclen
- Rescorbel
- Roc, le
- Rohorven
- Ronz er Moal
- Rotu, le
- Rullan
- Rustehen
- Saint Albaud
- Saint Germain
- Sainte Anne des Bois
- Storec
- Sur la Bosse
- Tachen Manac'h
- Toulhosparc
- Tromelin
- Ty Neve Kerlivio
- Tylen
- Ty Nevé
- Ty Nicol
- Véchen
- Villeneuve Zinzec
- Zinzec

== Gallery ==
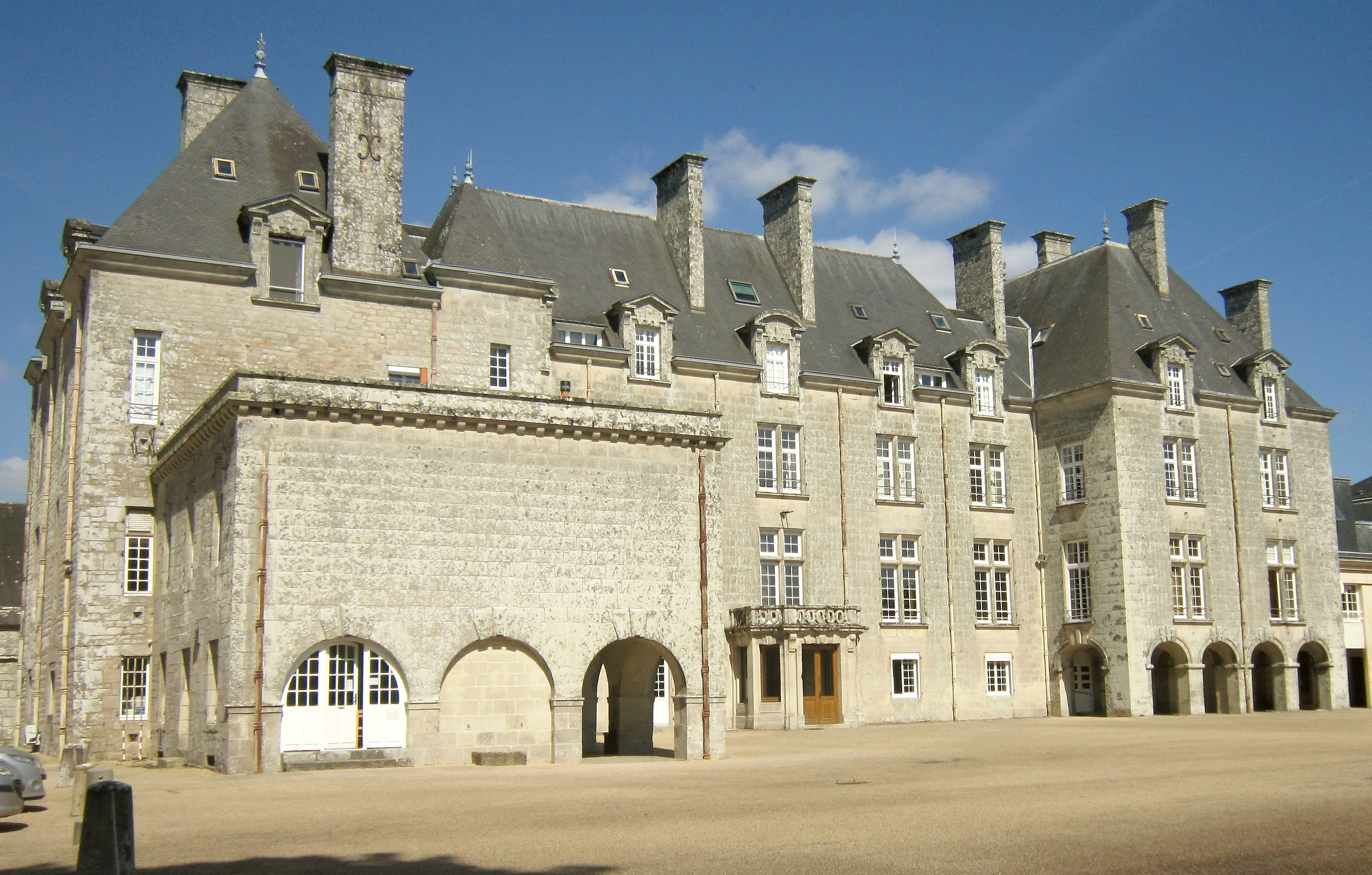
Pontcallec castle

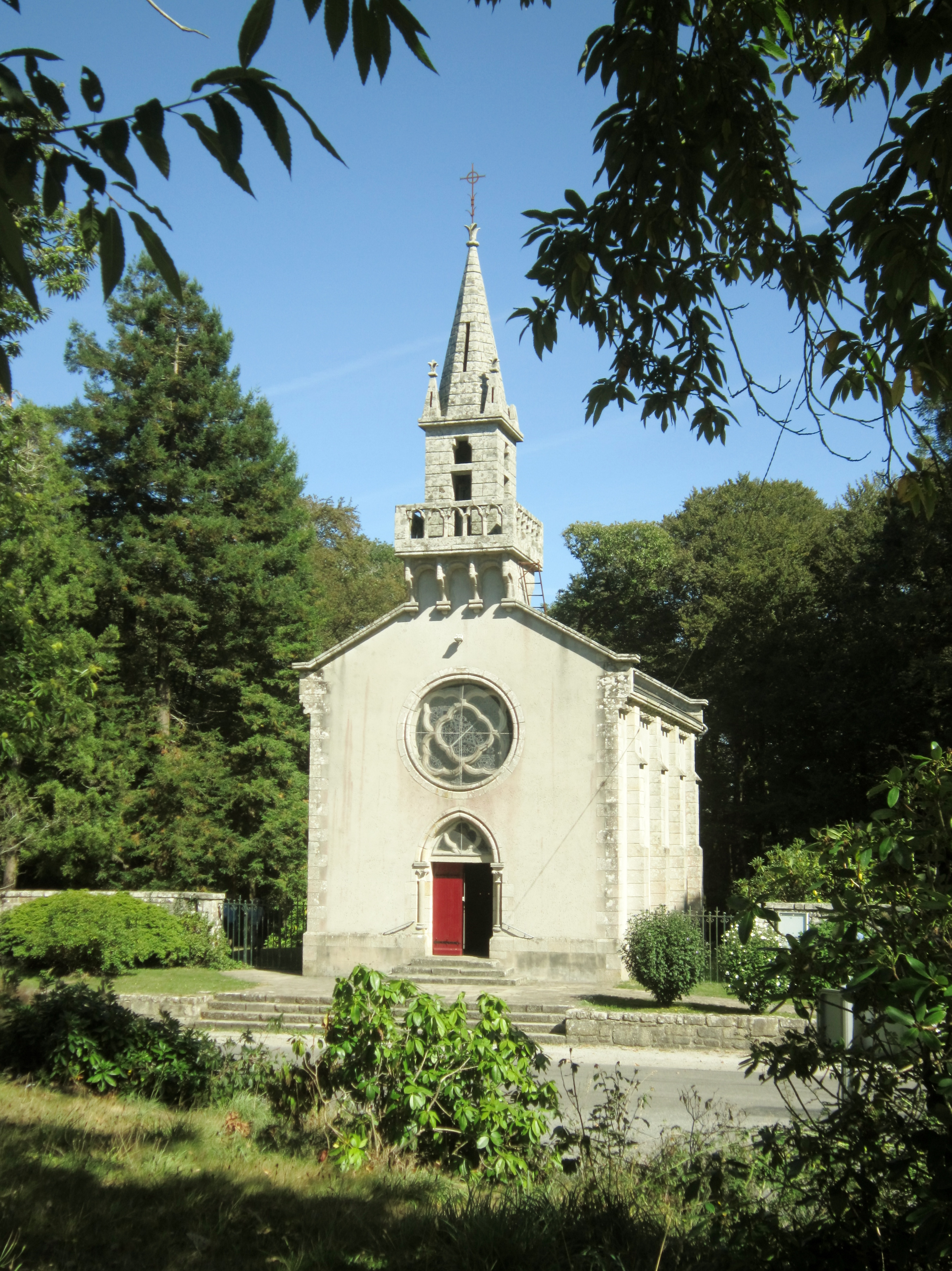
St Anne des Bois's chapel

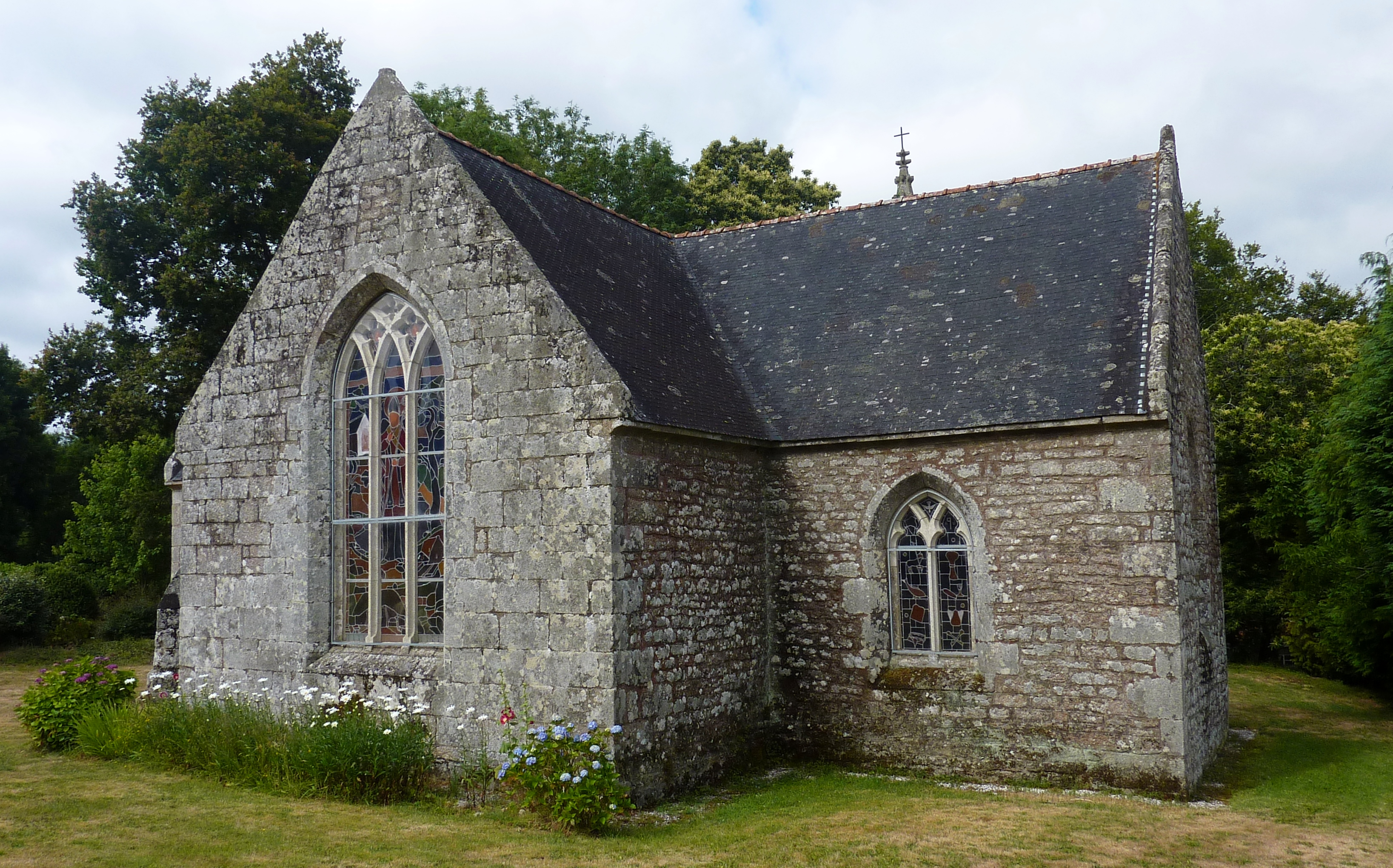
St Albaud's chapel

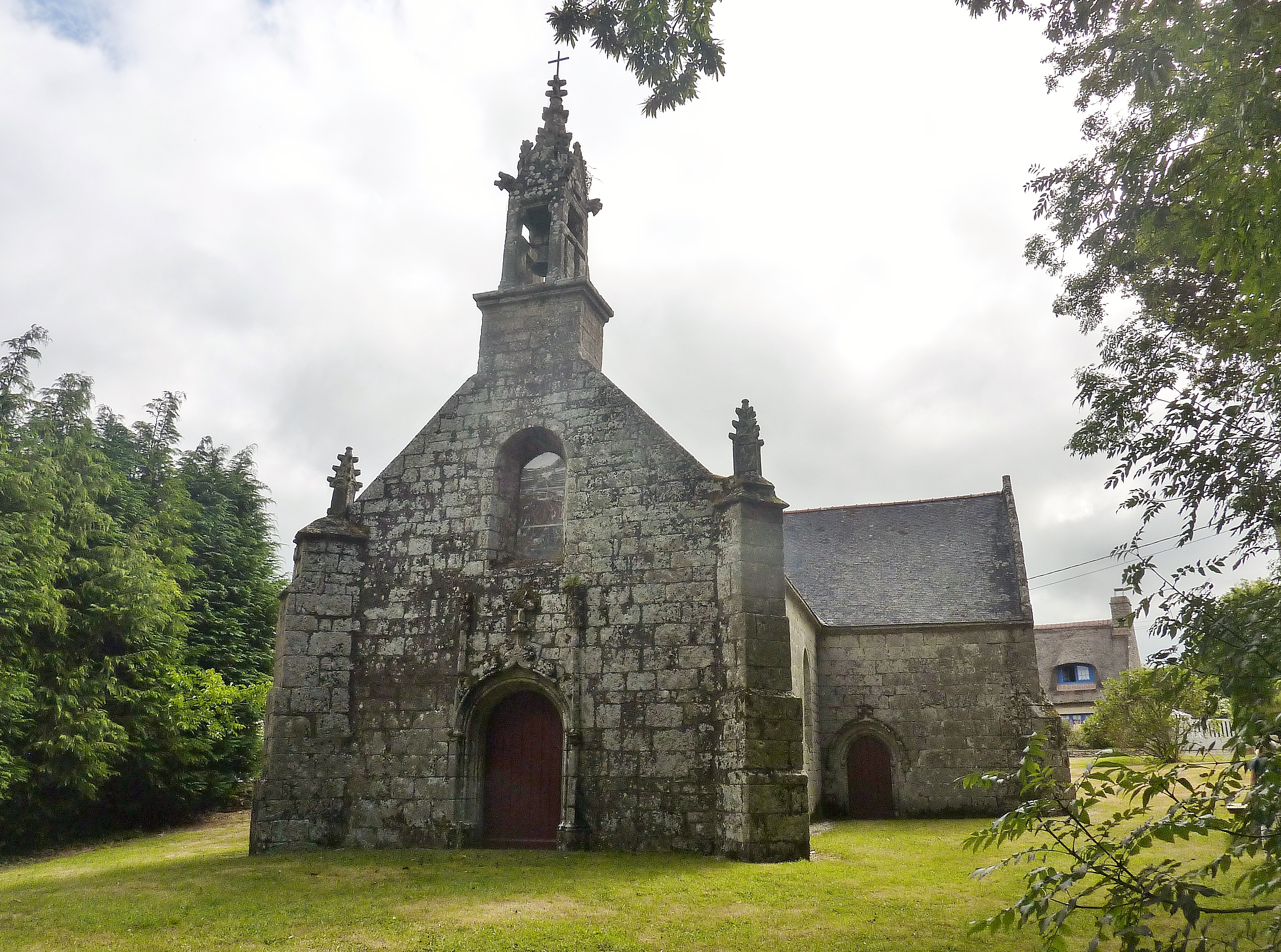
St Albaud's chapel

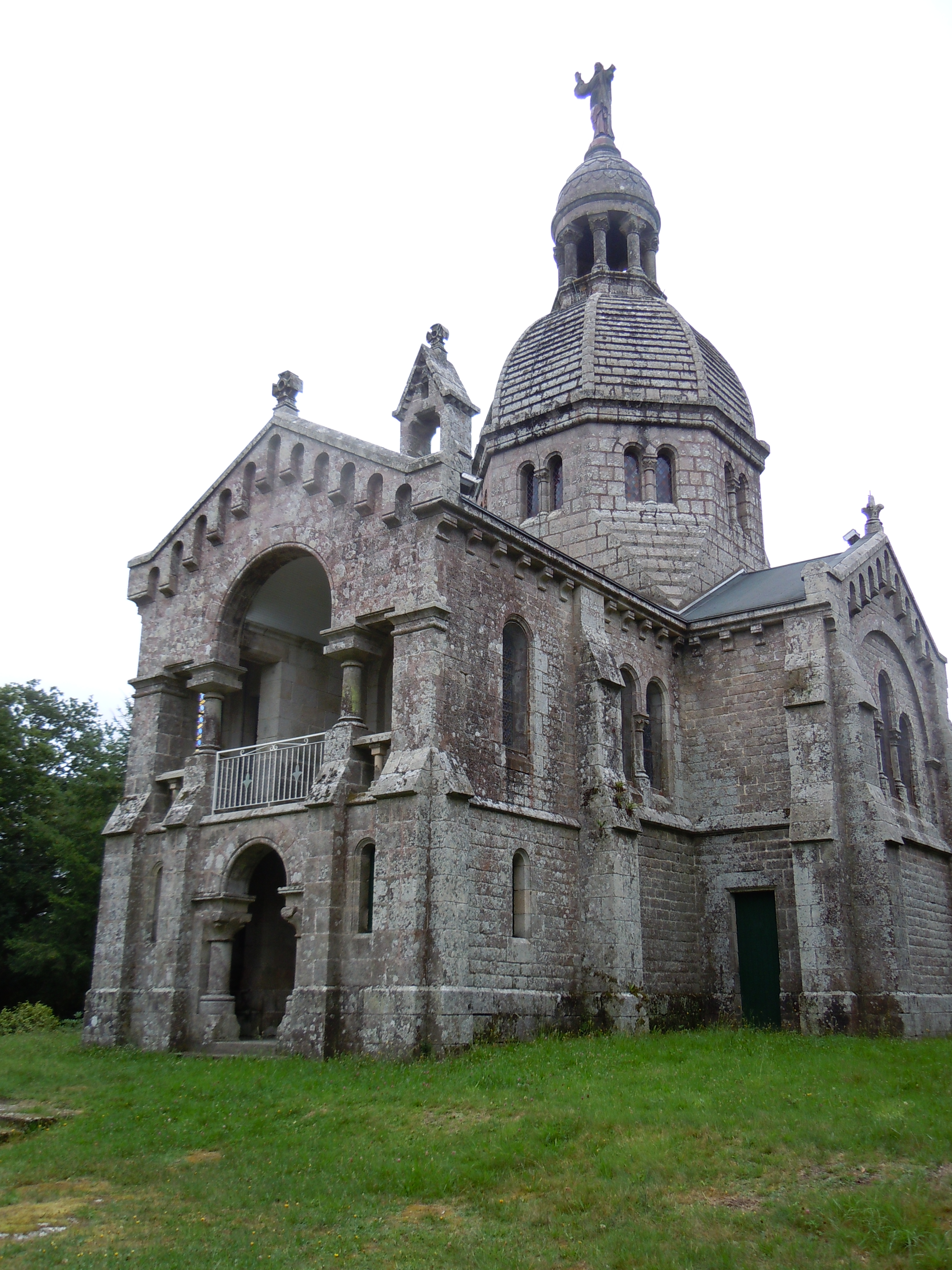
Sacré Coeur

== See also ==
- Communes of the Morbihan department
