= Lignol, Morbihan =

Commune in Brittany, France

Lignol An Ignol
- Commune
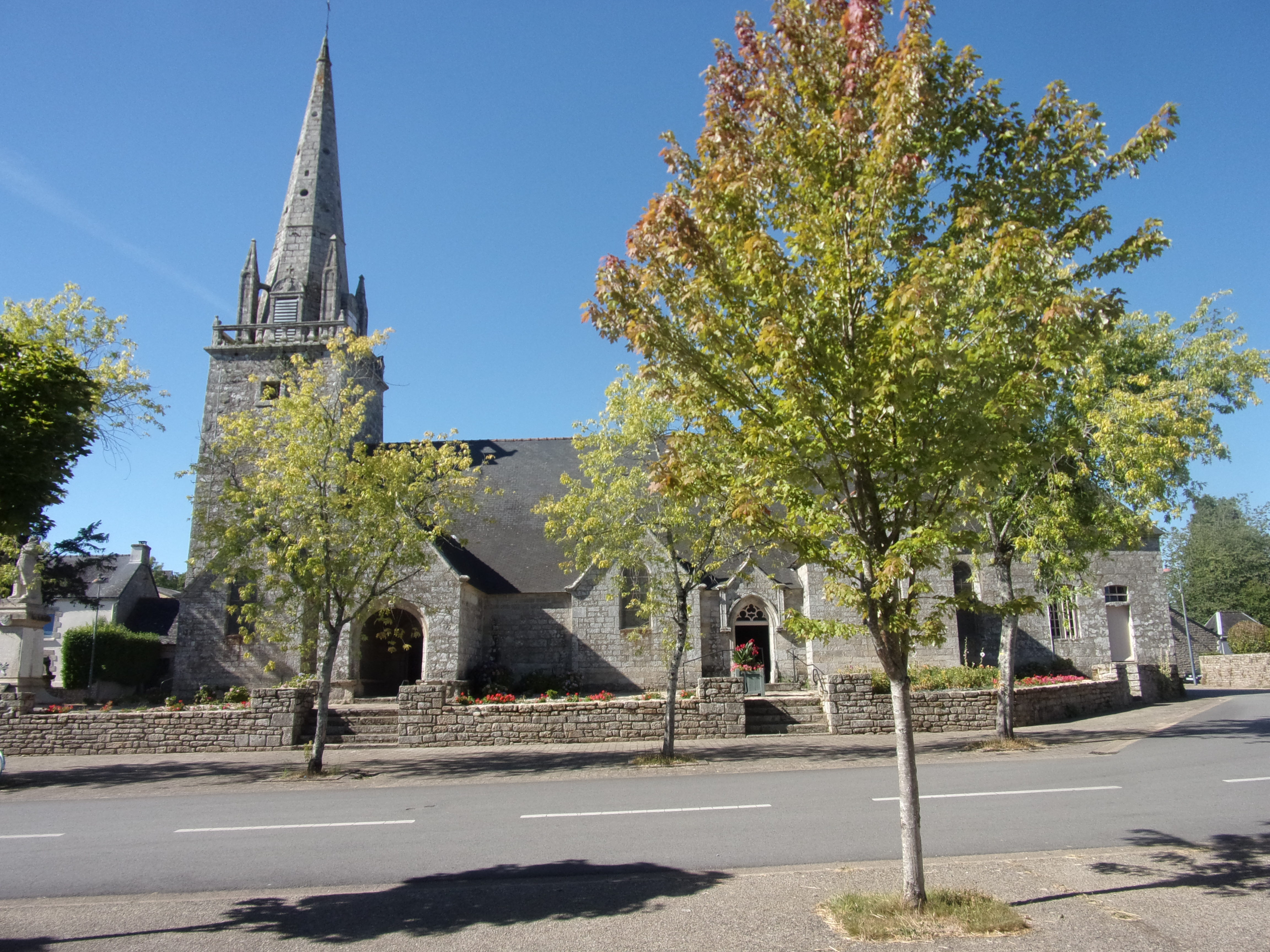
- The parish church
- Location of Lignol
- Location within France Location within Brittany
- Coordinates: 48°02′18″N 3°16′10″W
- Country: France
- Region: Brittany
- Department: Morbihan
- Arrondissement: Pontivy
- Canton: Gourin
- Intercommunality: Roi Morvan Communauté

Government
  - Mayor (2026–32): Laurent Boukandja
- Area^{1}: 38.43 km^{2} (14.84 sq mi)
- Highest elevation: 187 m (614 ft)
- Lowest elevation: 93 m (305 ft)
- Population (2023): 861
  - Density: 22.4/km^{2} (58.0/sq mi)
- Demonym(s): Lignolais, Lignolaises
- Time zone: UTC+01:00 (CET)
  - Summer (DST): UTC+02:00 (CEST)
- INSEE/Postal code: 56110 /56160
- ^{1} French Land Register data, which excludes lakes, ponds, glaciers > 1 km^{2} (0.386 sq mi or 247 acres) and river estuaries.

Lignol (French pronunciation: [liɲɔl]; Breton: An Ignol) is a commune in the Morbihan department of Brittany in north-western France.

== Population ==
Lignol's population peaked in 1911. Lignol's population has been decreased by 58% since this date because of rural exodus. Inhabitants of Lignol are called in French Lignolais.

Historical population

Year	Pop.	±% p.a.
1793	1,911	—
1800	1,914	+0.02%
1821	1,715	−0.52%
1831	1,780	+0.37%
1836	1,734	−0.52%
1841	1,722	−0.14%
1846	2,029	+3.34%
1851	1,925	−1.05%
1856	1,779	−1.57%
1861	1,844	+0.72%
1866	1,876	+0.34%
1872	1,661	−2.01%
1876	1,778	+1.72%
1881	1,928	+1.63%
1886	1,880	−0.50%
1891	1,809	−0.77%
1896	1,802	−0.08%
1901	1,785	−0.19%

Year	Pop.	±% p.a.
1906	1,896	+1.21%
1911	2,029	+1.37%
1921	2,008	−0.10%
1926	1,985	−0.23%
1931	1,931	−0.55%
1936	1,832	−1.05%
1946	1,887	+0.30%
1954	1,593	−2.09%
1962	1,512	−0.65%
1968	1,370	−1.63%
1975	1,203	−1.84%
1982	1,042	−2.03%
1990	906	−1.73%
1999	859	−0.59%
2007	892	+0.47%
2012	910	+0.40%
2017	853	−1.29%
2023	861	+0.16%

Source: EHESS and INSEE (1968-2023)

== Geography ==
Lignol lies in the valley of the river Scorff. The village centre is located 16 km (9.9 mi) east of Le Faouët, 22 km (14 mi) west of Pontivy and 33 km (21 mi) north of Lorient. Historically, it belongs to Vannetais.

== Map ==
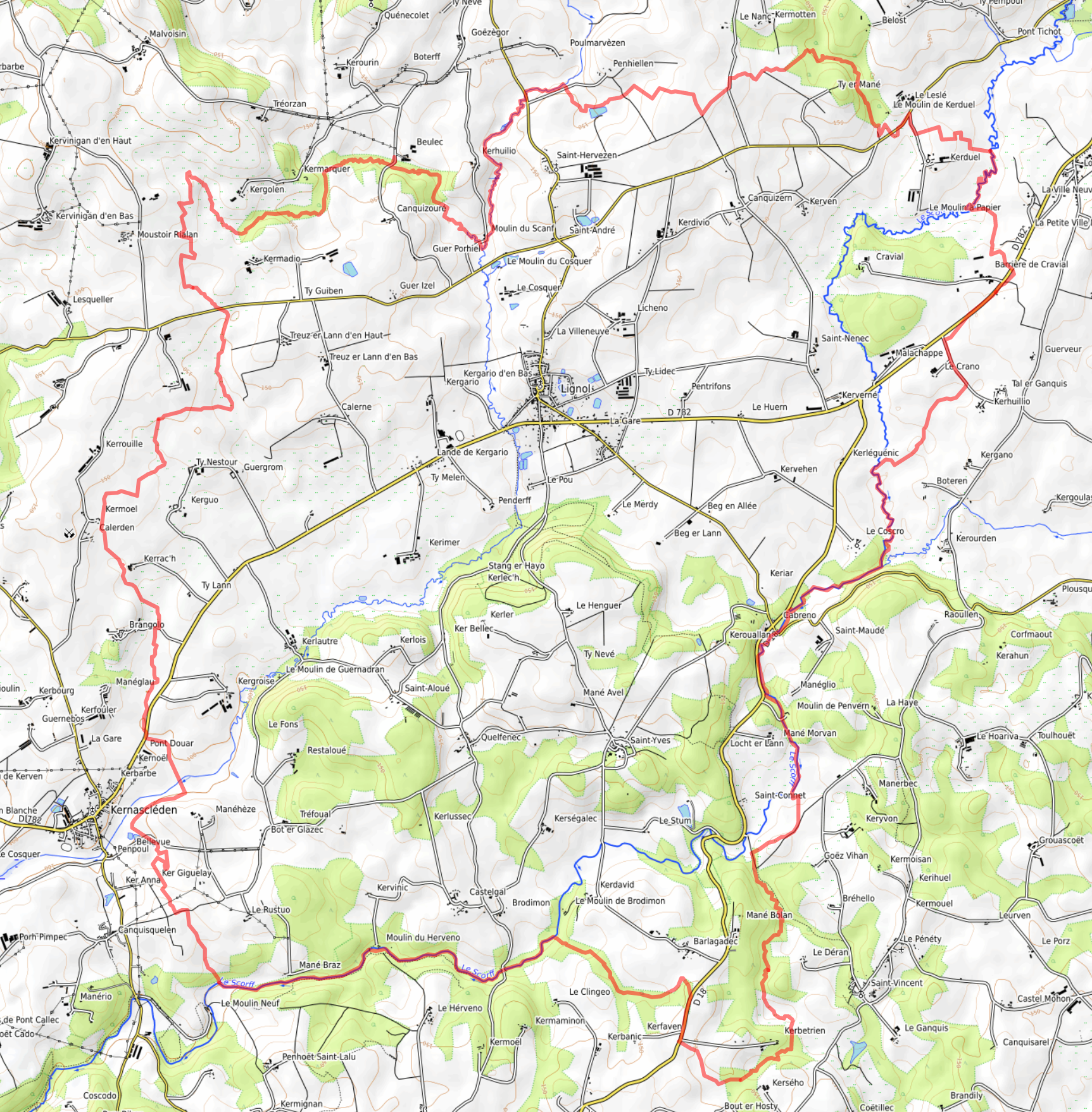
Topographic map

== History ==
There is a church in this town that was built during the 14th century. Lignol also has two castles, they were the homes of the dukes that used to rule the place and were under the domination of the House of Rohan. Lignol was the main place of the French resistance against the German occupation in the Guémené-sur-Scorff area. Since the Nazis occupied Guémené-sur-Scorff, the Resistance used the nearby towns as bases. Langoëlan and Lignol were their main ones in the region.

== Economy ==
Agriculture is the main source of resources of the town.

== Politics ==
During the presidential 2007 elections, inhabitants voted for Nicolas Sarkozy. Its current mayor is a former farmworker.

== Sport ==
Lignol has a soccer club in association with the neighbouring town of Kernaskleden.

== Gallery ==
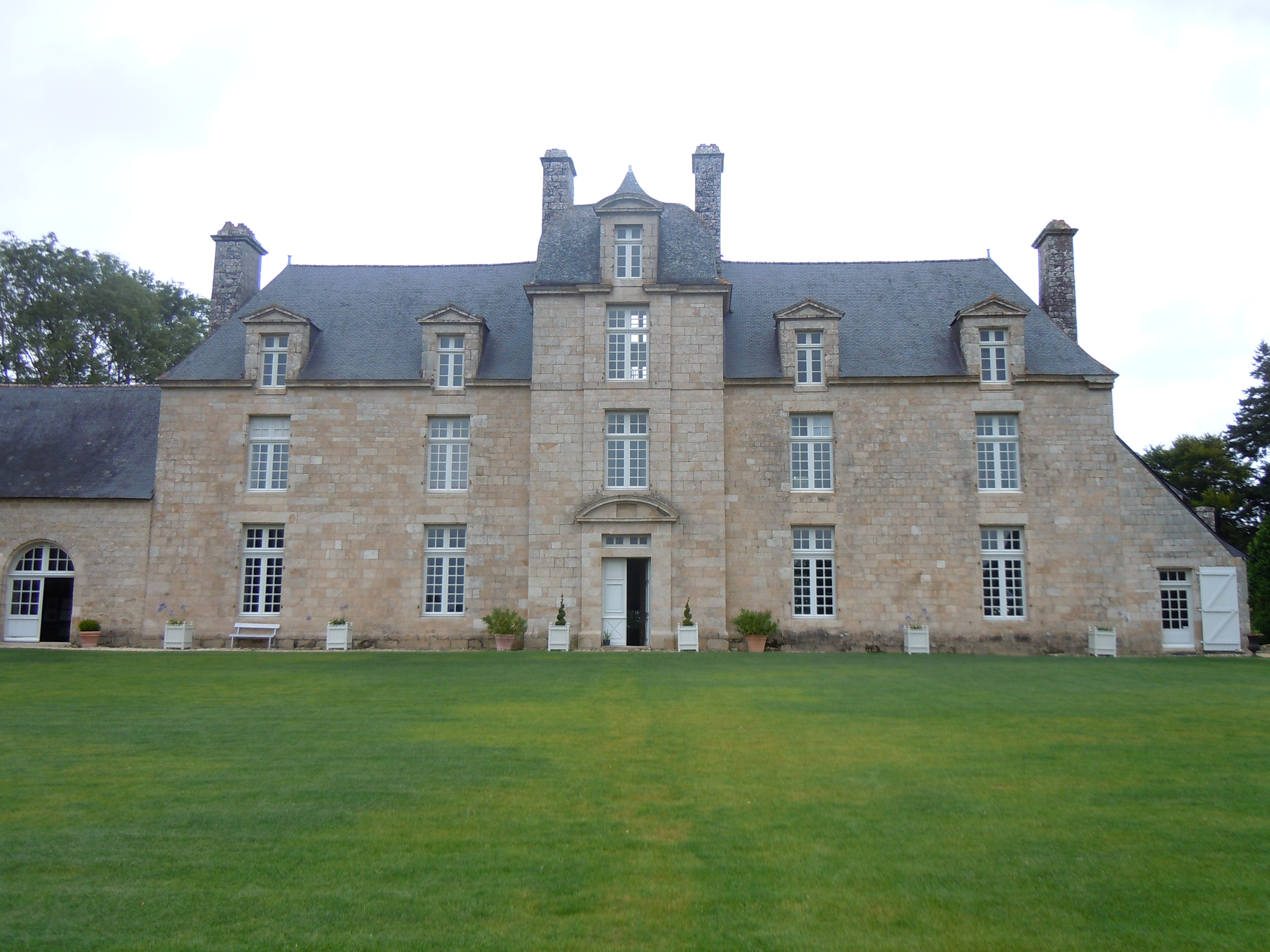
Coscro castle

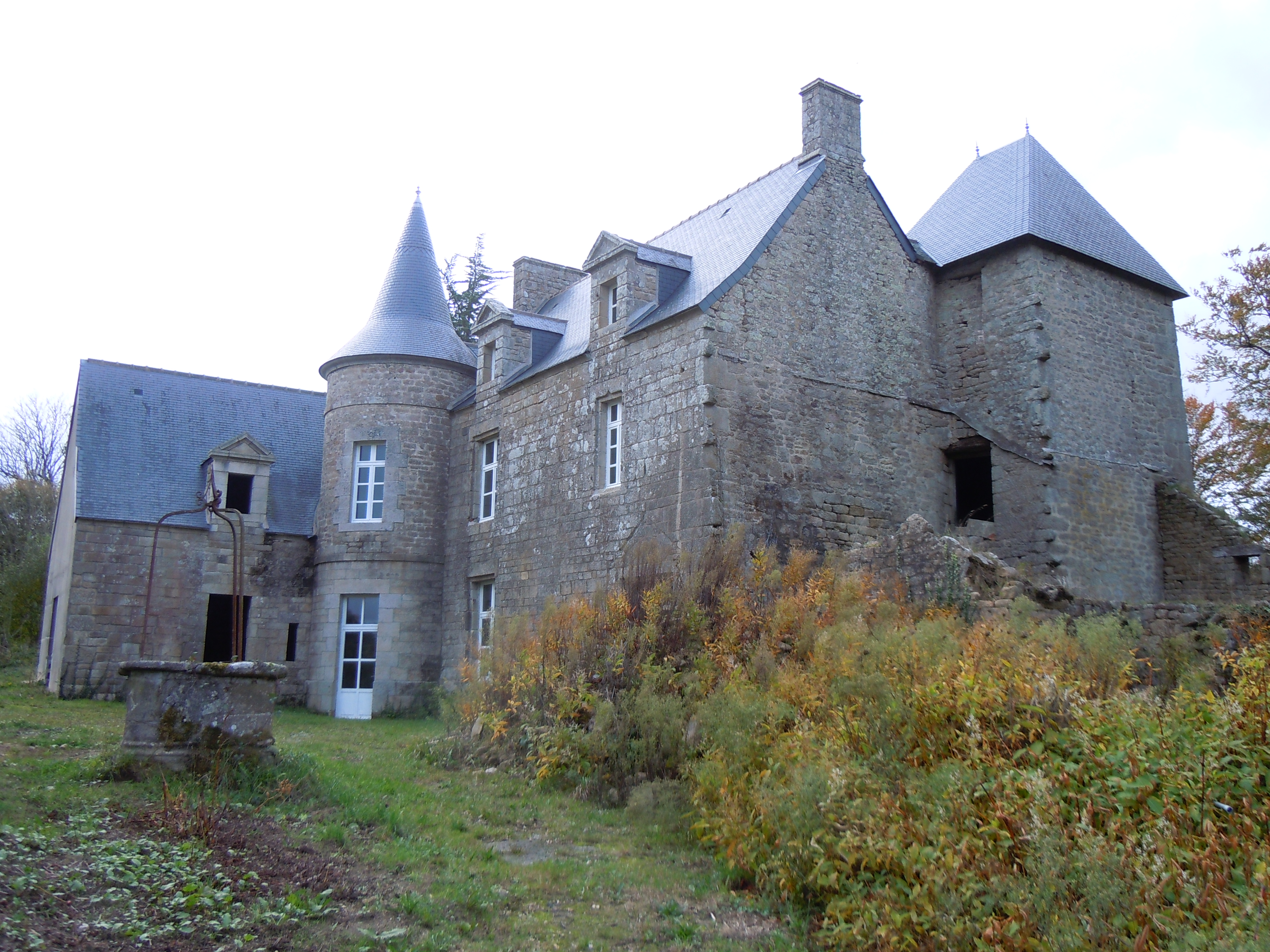
Manor of Kerouallan

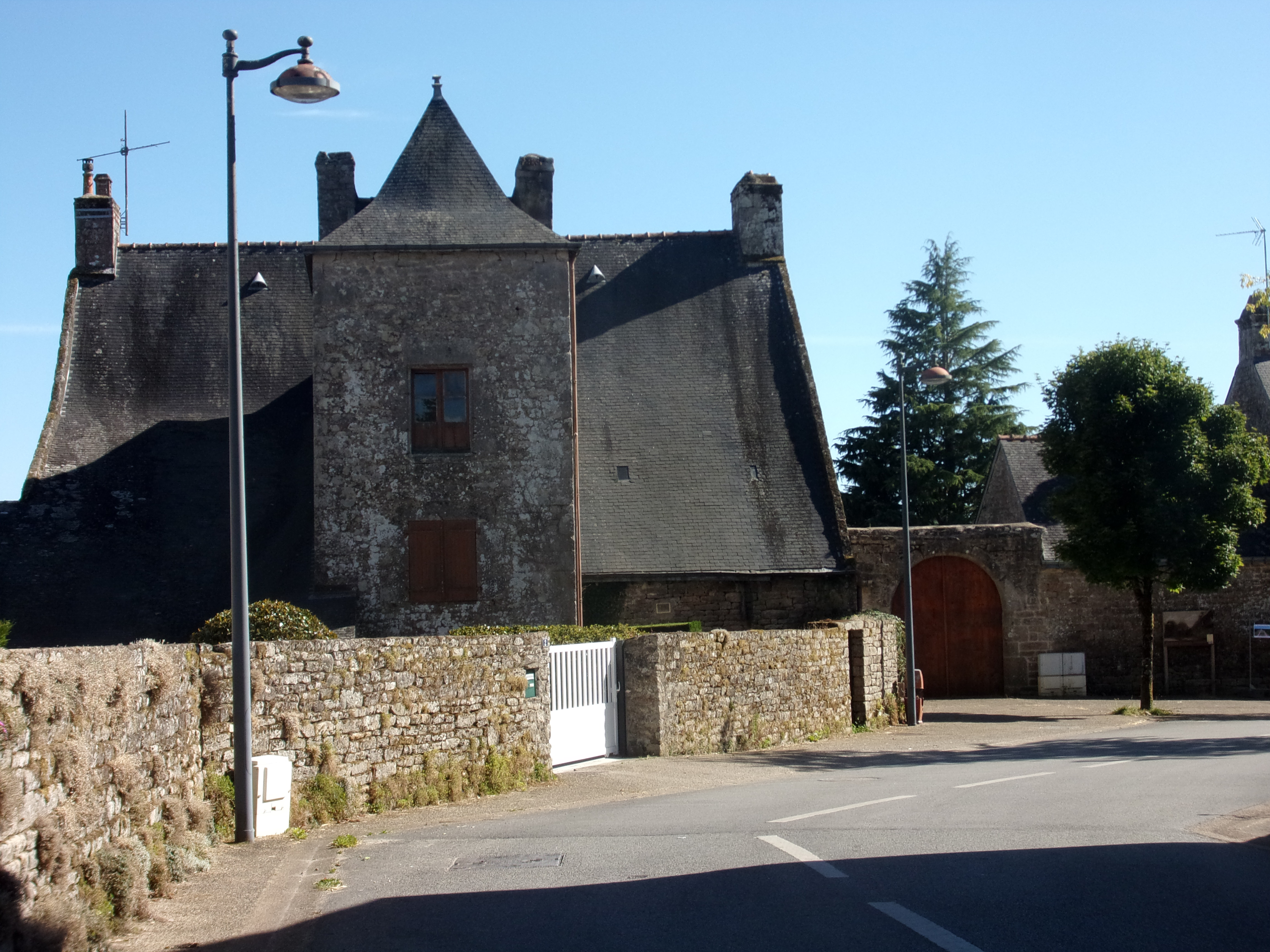
The ancient presbitery

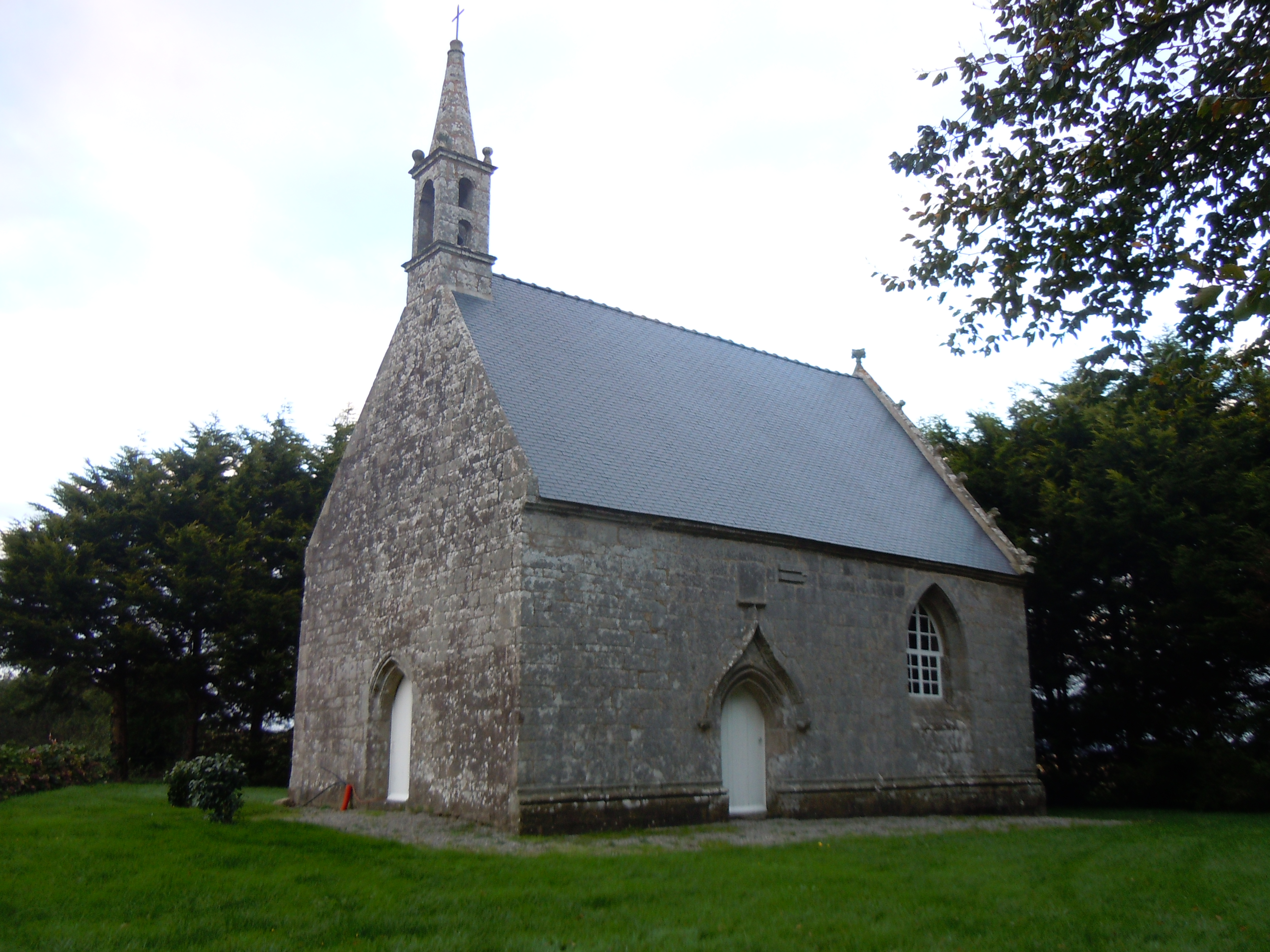
Chapel of Saint Melan

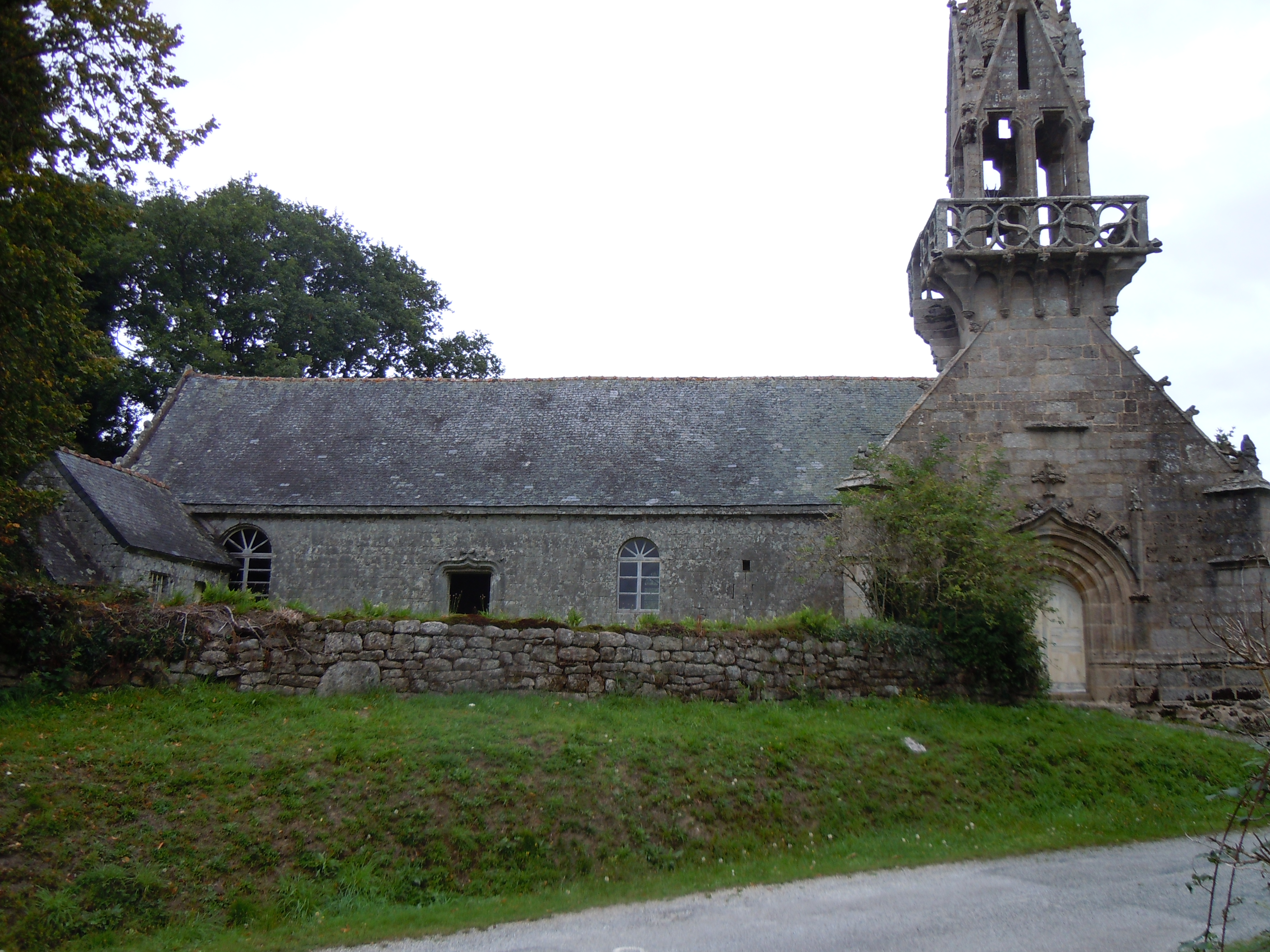
Chapel of Saint Yves

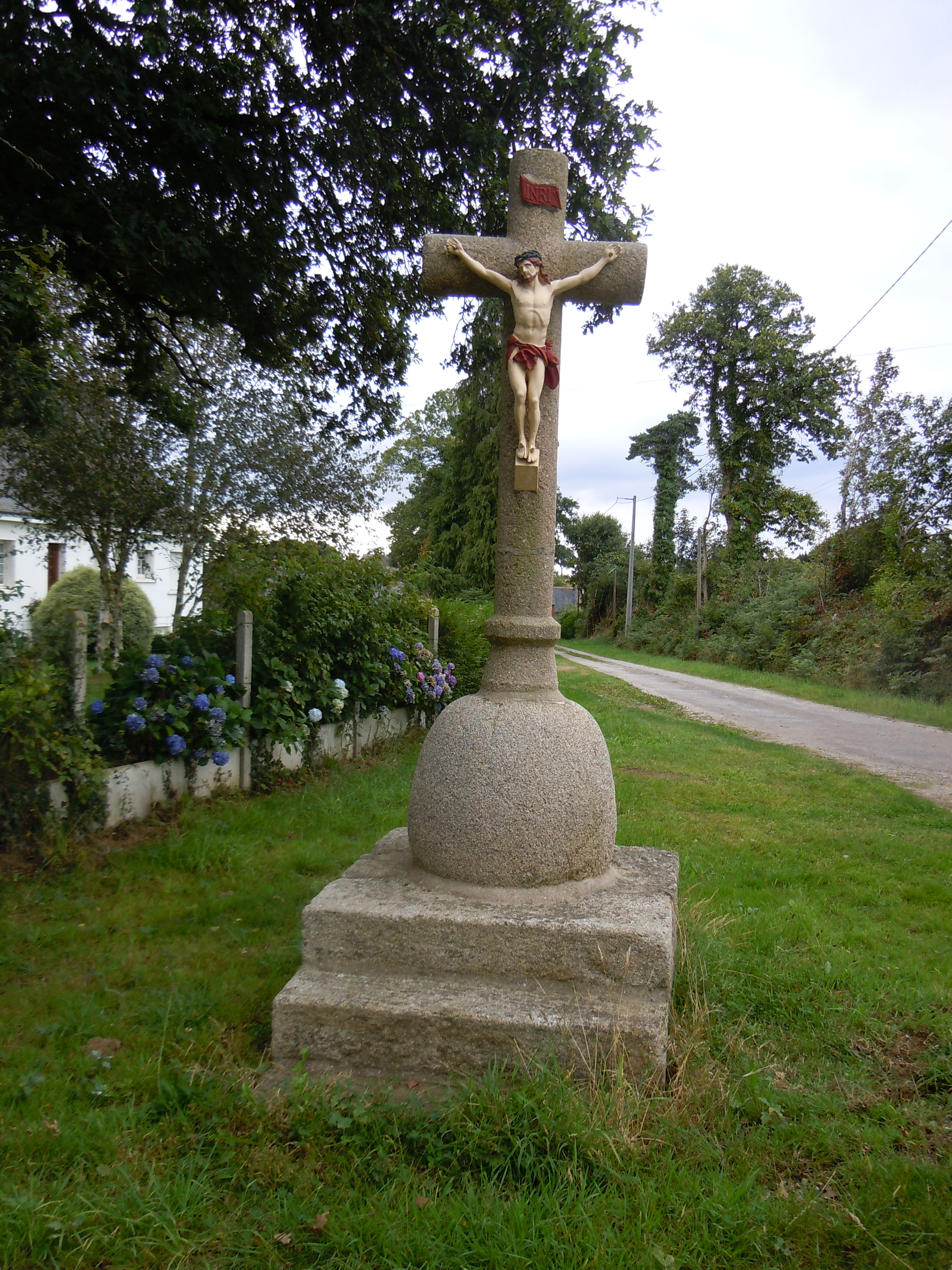
Christianized Iron Age stele

== See also ==
- Communes of the Morbihan department
