= Langonnet Abbey =

Abbey in Langonnet, France

Coordinates: 48.1060°N 3.4329°W

Langonnet Abbey Abbey of Notre-Dame de Langonnet
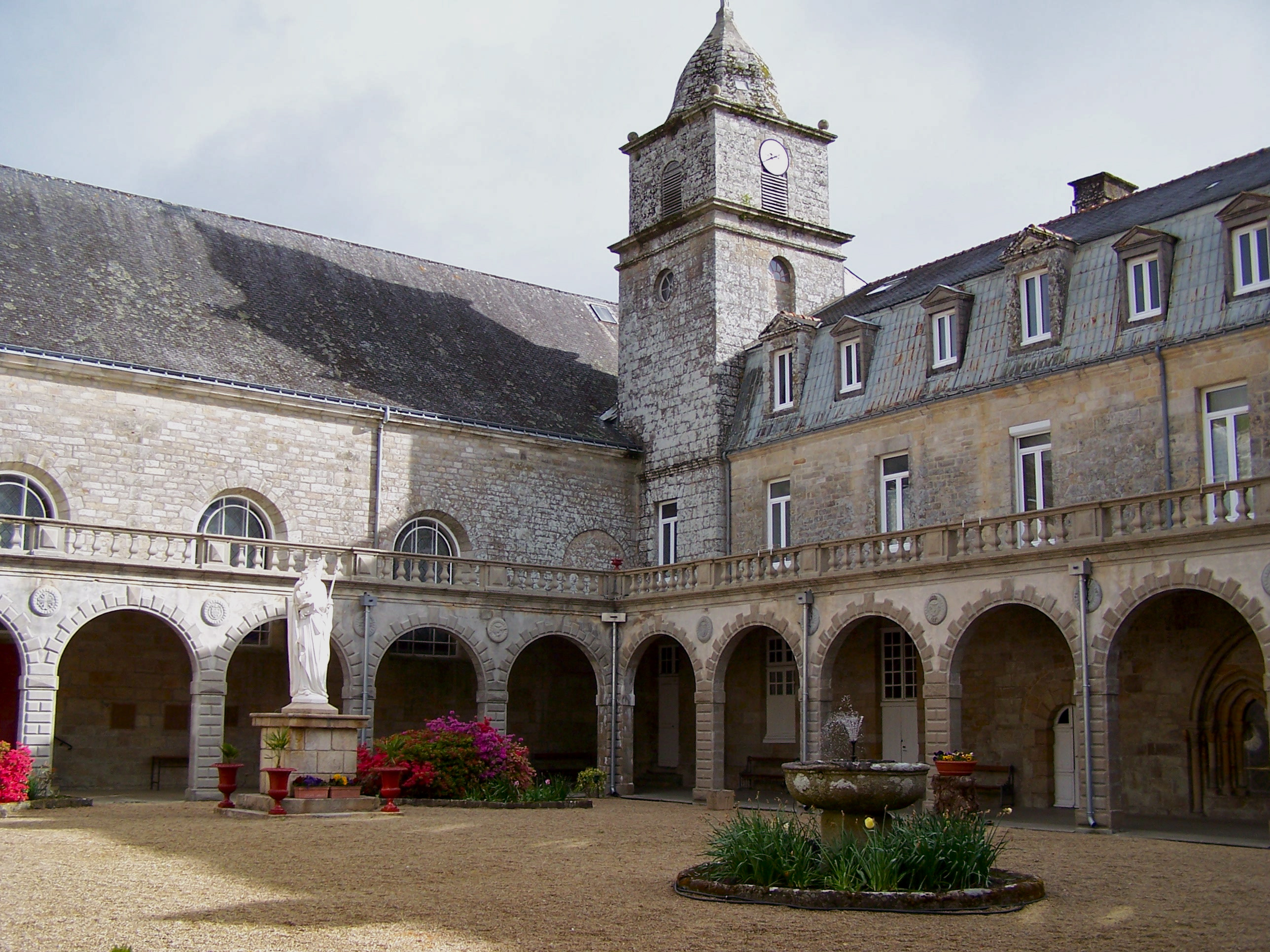
- Langonnet Abbey cloister

Religion
- Affiliation: Roman Catholic church
- District: Langonnet
- Province: Duchy of Brittany
- Region: Brittany
- Patron: Notre-Dame

Location
- Country: France

Architecture
- Established: June 20, 1136

Website
- https://abbayedelangonnet.fr/

Langonnet Abbey, formally the Abbey of Notre-Dame de Langonnet (French: Abbaye de Langonnet, Abbaye Notre-Dame de Langonnet), which became the Langonnet stud farm between 1807 and 1857, is a former Cistercian abbey belonging to the diocese of Quimper (now Vannes). It is located in the Gourin deanery, east of the village of Langonnet, on the road to Plouray. It now belongs to the Congrégation du Saint-Esprit. It was listed as a monument historique by decree on September 25, 1928. Its ogival-style chapter house dates back to the 13th century.

== History ==
=== Middle age ===
The site of the present-day abbey was probably occupied as early as the 5th century by Breton immigrants from across the Channel, perhaps disciples of Saint Conogan, but nothing remains of the original buildings.

Notre-Dame de Langonnet Abbey was founded on June 20, 1136 by Conan III, sovereign duke of Brittany, and his mother Ermengarde of Anjou. "There were marshes and peat bogs. The Cistercians cleaned up the land and cultivated it. Raoul, bishop of Cornouaille (1130-1158), was buried there. Twelve monks from l'Aumône Abbey, in La Colombe, Loir-et-Cher, in the diocese of Chartres, settled here in 1136.

All ancient titles to foundations and donations have disappeared. A confession dated 1550 attests that the abbey owned 82 villages, manors, noble holdings, mills and forests, including 63 in Langonnet, 14 in Gourin and 5 in Le Faouët. In particular, it owned the Conveau wood in Gourin and the Conveau manor house.

In 1170, Duke Conan IV gave the abbey's Cistercian monks several villages near the Carnoët forest to establish a community. Maurice Duault de Croixanvec (later Saint Maurice de Carnoët), then abbot of Langonnet Abbey, founded an abbey there in 1177, near the banks of the Laïta river, called Notre-Dame de Carnoët, of which he was abbot until his death in 1191. The abbey was later renamed Saint-Maurice de Carnoët.

During the War of the Breton Succession, the abbey was largely ruined (only the chapel and a few sections of wall remain). In 1387, the General Chapter of the Cistercian Order recorded its state of devastation and consequently exempted it from all taxes and arrears. In 1442, the General Chapter of Citeaux noted for a second time the state of devastation of Langonnet Abbey, "which has not yet been repaired". Between 1470 and 1518, abbots Vincent and Henri de Kergoët completely rebuilt the abbey.

=== Modern period ===
In 1595, the monks were expelled during the troubles of the League War. The church was turned into a stable by the soldiers of League leader Guy Éder de La Fontenelle. They returned in 1598, but the abbey was in ruins and the surrounding lords had seized most of their lands. It was largely rebuilt between 1650 and 1780: "The main body of the abbey is a large square building, of which the church occupies one side; most of this building was constructed in the time of the abbot commendataire Claude de Marbœuf" (an inscription Aeternitati positum [built for eternity] gives the date 1688), "the church is the newest part, built by abbé François Chevreul and dedicated in 1789".

=== French Revolution ===
The monks were expelled at the end of 1790 during the French Revolution, and the abbey was put up for sale as bien national. Unable to find a buyer, it was rented to the Bréban family, who hid a number of refractory priests there. It soon became a refuge for the Chouans, who were dislodged by a detachment of republican soldiers from Le Faouët, who vandalized the premises and took up residence there to keep watch over the surrounding area.

On Pluviôse 24, Year IX (February 13, 1801), the Langonnet gendarmes were attacked in the abbey by more than 50 armed men.

=== The nineteenth century ===
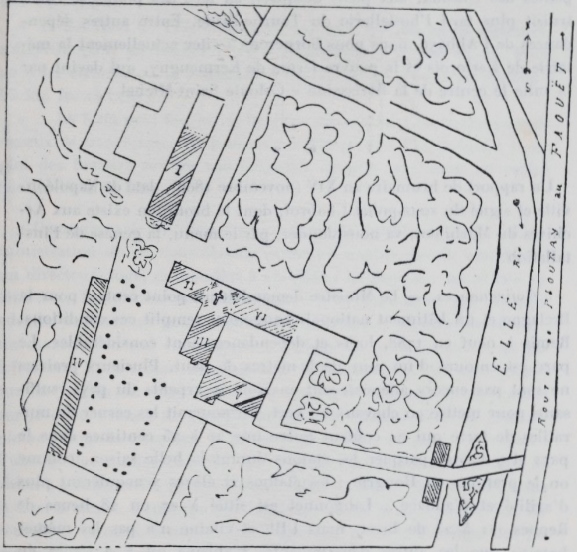
Plan of the Langonnet stud farm (hatched areas show the various buildings occupied by the stud farm).

At the time, the abbey was in a sorry state: "No doors, no windows, no woodwork; collapsed roofs, rotten frames! (...) Urgent repairs had to be carried out to install a stud farm. The upper part of the chapel was converted into a hayloft".

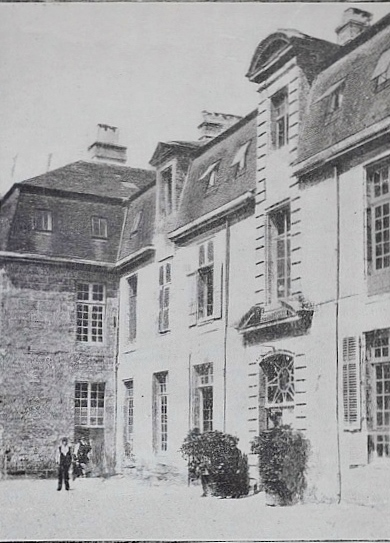
The front of the Langonnet stud's main building, photographed in 1931.

By decree of June 10, 1806, Napoleon I established Brittany's first public stud farm with forty stallions and ten brood mares. The choice of Langonnet was debated: "Langonnet (...) is located in the most appalling desert of Lower Brittany: the premises, a stone hovel, without roof or framework, the ruin of an abbey, with a few hovels around. You can only get supplies from Pontivi (Pontivy) or Hennebon (Hennebont)" wrote General Baron de Wimpfen, clearly unfavorable to this choice, in a report dated May 28, 1807.

The establishment prospered for a time, however: "It is now a first-class stallion depot serving the four departments of the Brittany peninsula. Its position is very advantageous, in the middle of beautiful meadows watered by the lovely Ellé river, and surrounded by a walled park. The Langonnet depot is made up of beautiful buildings and vast courtyards. A great deal of work has been carried out over the last few years, and if the roads had been made passable, it would have become one of the most magnificent in France, just as it is one of the most important. The Langonnet depot now has seventy stallions," write A. Marteville and P. Varin. Marteville and P. Varin in 1843.

The establishment was moved to Hennebont in 1856-1857, and the abbey was returned to the "Missionaries of the Holy Spirit", where he rediscovers his religious vocation. A model farm was then established by Achille du Clésieux, which became an agricultural colony for children.

In 1880, the establishment of Notre-Dame de Langonnet, directed by the Brothers of the Holy Spirit and the Sacred Heart of Mary, ran "a secondary school, a scholasticate and a Brothers' novitiate for those destined for the Missions".

Saint-Maurice de Carnoët Abbey owned 5 cm of Saint Maurice's right humerus. As the abbey was falling into ruin, the translation of the precious relic to the Abbaye Notre-Dame de Langonnet on August 7 and 8, 1880, in the presence of the bishops of Quimper and Vannes, 150 priests and 20,000 devotees.

=== The twentieth century and the twenty-first century ===
In August 1930, great solemnities celebrated the fiftieth anniversary of the translation of the relics of Saint Maurice of Carnoët.

"In the heart of Breton Brittany, which by 1930 had already given 153 Fathers and Brothers of the Holy Spirit to religious France, Notre-Dame de Langonnet has become a citadel of the missionary spirit," particularly in Africa. "The old missionaries reside there, to put an interval between their life of action and supreme rest; there, in an apostolic school, are formed the children who will later perpetuate the lineage" wrote Georges Goyau in 1936.

Sam Poupon founded the cercle de l'abbaye in 1950 (Korollerien an Ellé), one of the first (after the Poullaouen group) to revive Breton dance.

The abbey now serves as a resting place for elderly Spiritan missionaries, and houses a museum of African art and its collection of objects gathered by former missionaries to Africa, as well as a missionary animation center.

== Architecture ==
Today's abbey comprises a chapter house, cloister, dwelling, guest quarters, chapel, school (former abbot's dwelling) and workshops. The abbey has undergone many alterations, and it is impossible to trace the layout and dimensions of the original building. The chapter house, surrounded by buildings dating from the modern era, is the only vestige dating back to the 13th century: "it has an ogival doorway overlooking the cloister, flanked on either side by twin bays, all with a lancet arch, with several recesses formed by toroids falling on columns with bases and leafy capitals; each of the double bays is also framed by an arcade, also ogival. Inside, the hall, now converted into a chapel, consists of two naves with three bays, with stone vaults and ribbed cross vaults resting on columns with foliate capitals. Next to this beautiful room, which is reminiscent of the rooms at Mont-Saint-Michel, is another apartment dating back to the same period, vaulted in stone and ogival, which is thought to have been the monks' penitentiary ".

Various reconstructions were carried out between the 17th century (abbot's dwelling) and the 20th century (the current cloister was built between 1930 and 1936). The chapel dates from the second half of the 19th century. The abbey also boasts a museum of African art.

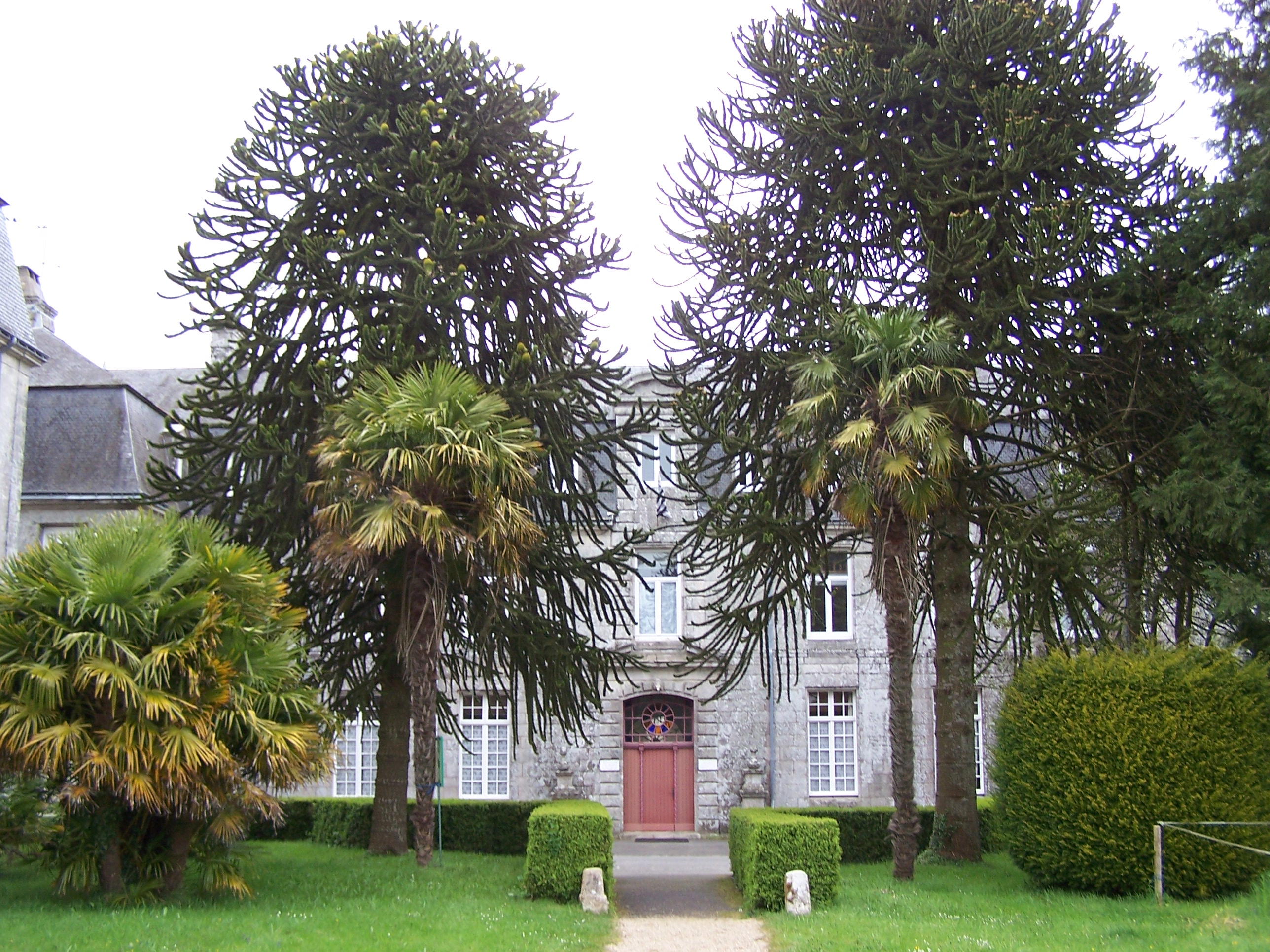
The entrance to the abbey

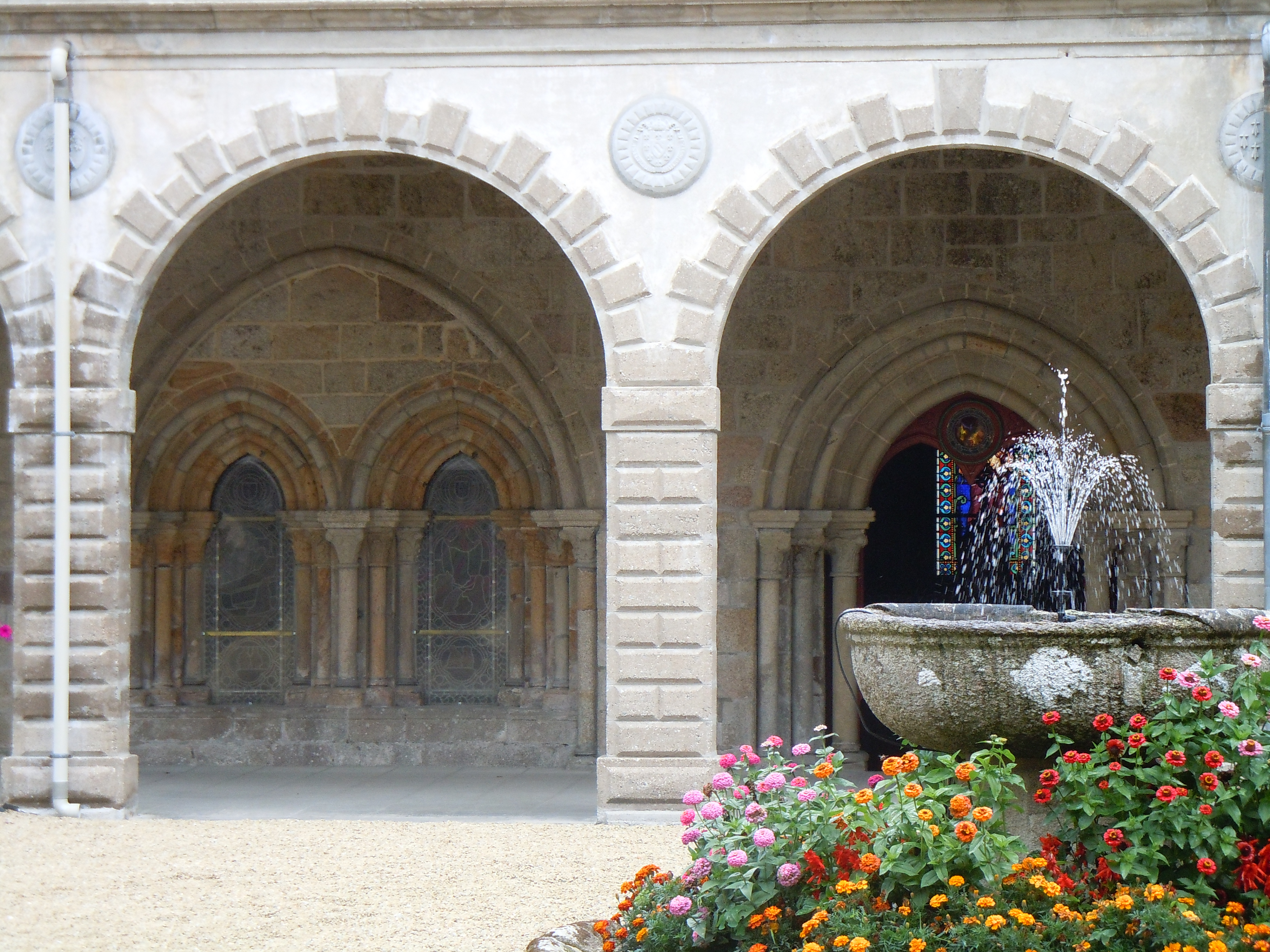
The entrance to the chapter house.

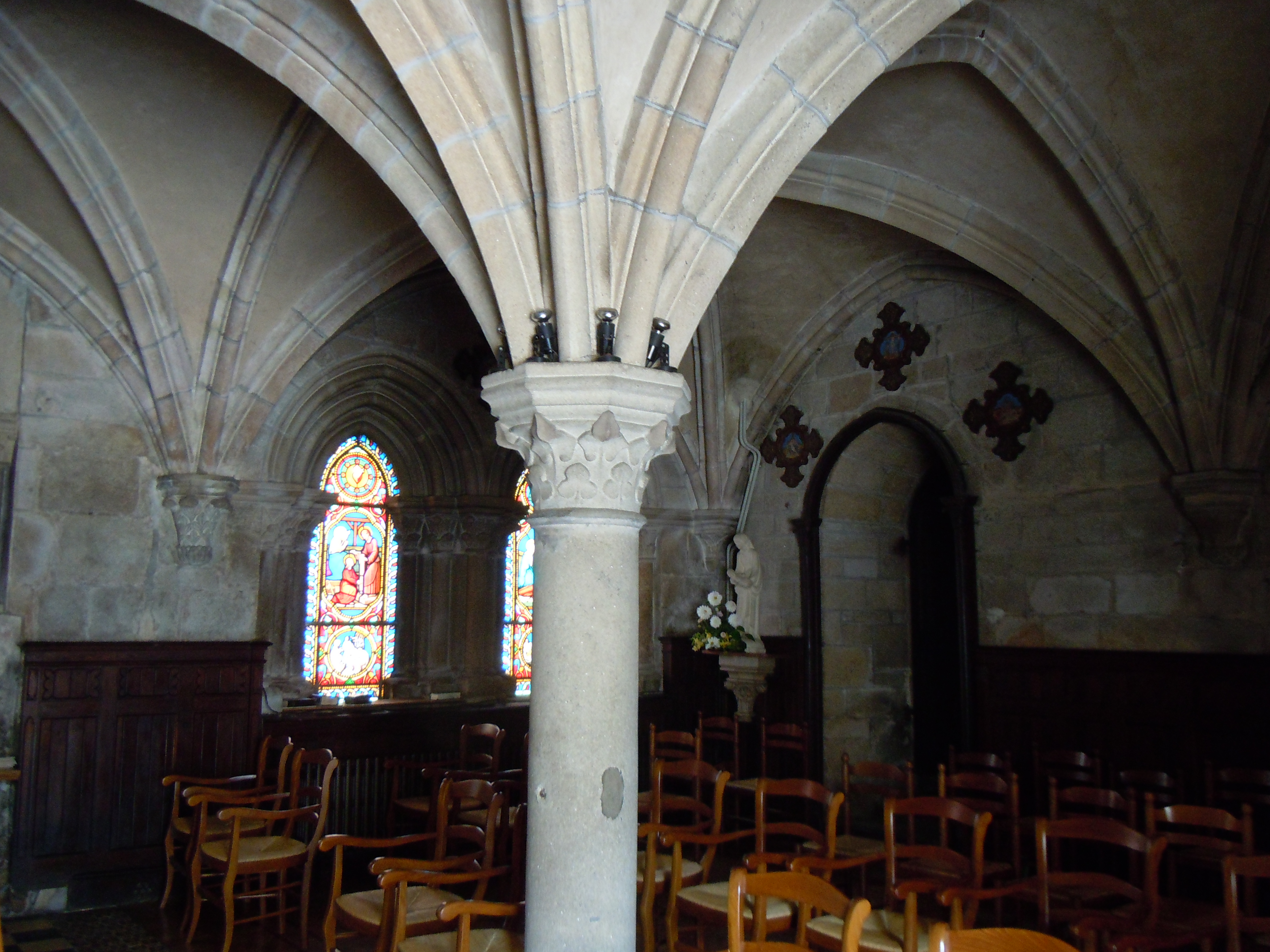
The chapter house

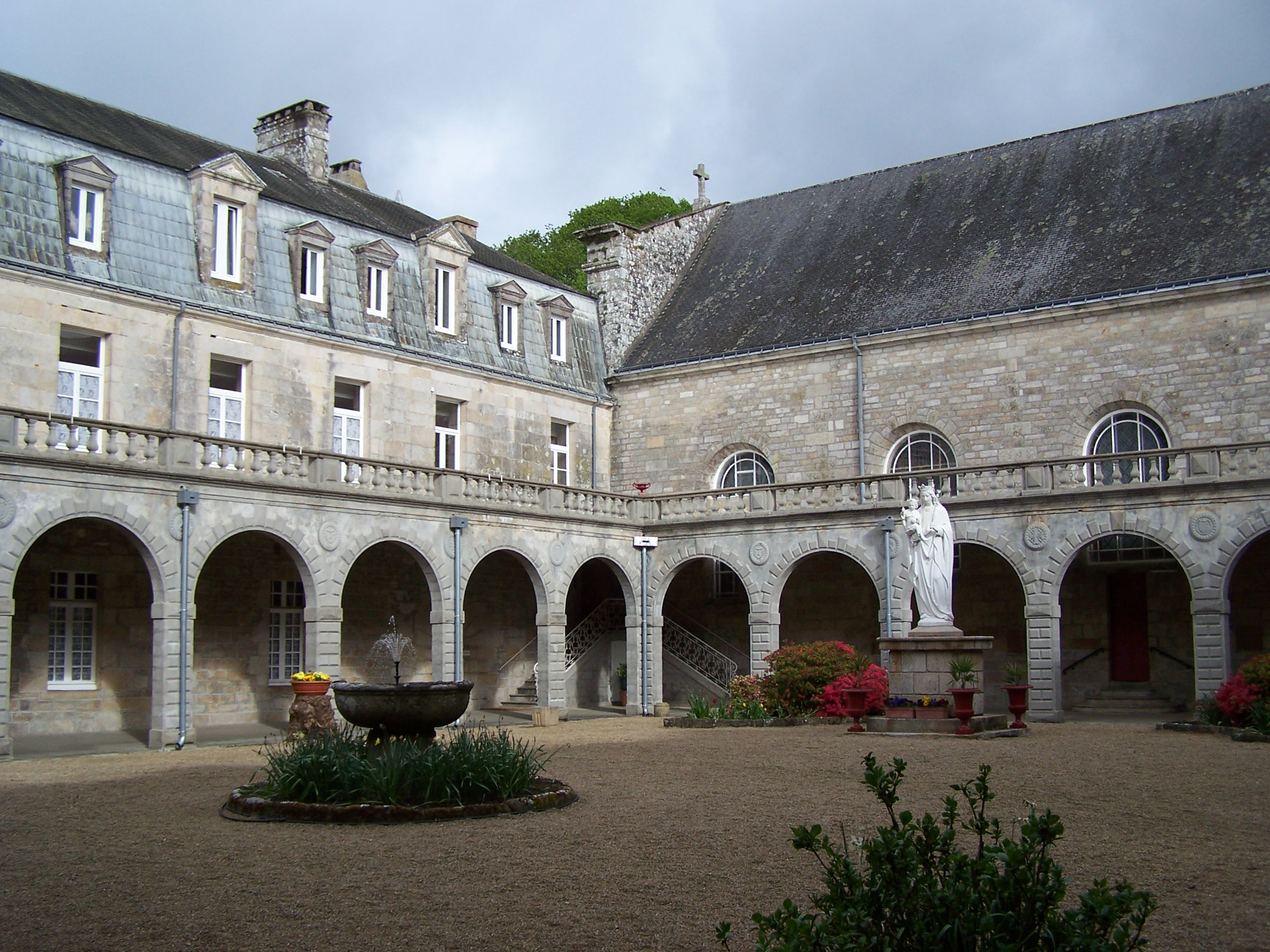
The abbey cloister.

== Filiation and dependencies ==
Langonnet Abbey is the daughter of Aumône Abbey and the mother of Carnoët Abbey.

=== Filiation ===
- Cîteaux Abbey
- L'Aumône Abbey
- Clairvaux Abbey
- Buzay Abbey
- Villeneuve Abbey
- Prières Abbey

== List of Abbots ==
Abbey of Notre-Dame de Langonnet

=== Regular abbots ===
- 1136-1138 : N ?
- 1146-1191: Maurice Duault
- 1192-1220 : Hervé de Cabostel
- ---/---
- 1307: Guillaume
- ---/---
- 1393-1435: Guillaume de Kermain
- ---/---
- 1470-1482: Henri de Kergoët
- 1510-1514: Vincent de Kergoët
- 1518-1536: Yves de Boutteville
- 1540-1540: Jean Nicolas

=== Commendatory abbots ===
- 1540-1590: Laurent Buonaccorsi
- 1590-1641: Paul Buonaccorsi15
- 1641-1647: Jacques de Montenay
- 1648-1674: Isaac de Marbœuf (baptized April 30, 1615, died January 28, 1679)
- 1674-1723: Claude de Marbœuf, nephew of the above15
- 1723-1754: René-Auguste de Marbœuf, his nephew
- 1754-1765: François de Lesquen
- 1766-1785: Toussaint Conen de Saint-Luc
- 1786-1790: François-Charles Chevreul

== People who died at Langonnet Abbey ==
- Father Jean Prat, linguist (Tarbes 1868 - Langonnet 1952)
- Mgr François Cléret de Langavant (Saint-Malo 1896 - Langonnet 1991)

== See also ==
- Cistercians
- Congregation of the Holy Spirit
- List of Cistercian monasteries in France
- Abbey La Joie Notre-Dame

== Bibliography ==
- Saint Gal de Pons, A. (1931). Les origines du cheval breton - Le haras de Langonnet - Les Dépôts d'Etalons de Lamballe et d'Hennebont - Le Dépôt de Remonte de Guingamp.
- Abbaye Notre-Dame Langonnet. Histoire et Découverte de l'abbaye. Congrégation du Saint-Esprit.
- "L'Église de Langonnet, son histoire, son architecture, Supplément à l'Écho des Montagnes Noires". Journal Paroissial. 1996.
- Les Abbayes Bretonnes. Paris: B.A.B & Fayard. 1983. pp. 395–403. ISBN 978-2-213-01313-8.
- Le Franc, Erwann (2019). "Reconstruction et réaménagement des abbayes cisterciennes dans le diocèse de Vannes au XVIIe et XVIIIe siècles". Les Abbayes Cisterciennes. Langonnet: Association des abbayes cisterciennes bretonnes.

== External articles ==
- History
- Sculptural and architectural details
