= Définitoire =

Protected building of Cîteaux Abbey

The Définitoire is a building located within the Notre-Dame de Cîteaux Abbey in Burgundy, France. Built from 1685 onwards, it served as the meeting place of the General Chapter of the Cistercian Order, the body responsible in particular for the Order's decisions and governance. Closely connected with the institutional history of the Cistercians, this space reflects the central role of Cîteaux Abbey in the organization of its monastic Order.

== History ==
The construction of the Définitoire began in 1685 under the abbacy of Dom Jean Petit (1670-1692). The building served two main purposes: providing better facilities for the General Chapter, which could include up to 600 participants in the 17th century, and expanding areas devoted to the novitiate.

From 1601 onwards, the different Cistercian abbeys shared a common novitiate to strengthen monastic life. Until then, novices were trained in the abbey they had entered. In 1623, the common novitiate was placed under the responsibility of the Abbot of Cîteaux and the first four Fathers. In 1635, the General Chapter asked the abbeys concerned to adapt their buildings for this new organisation.

== Heritage designation ==
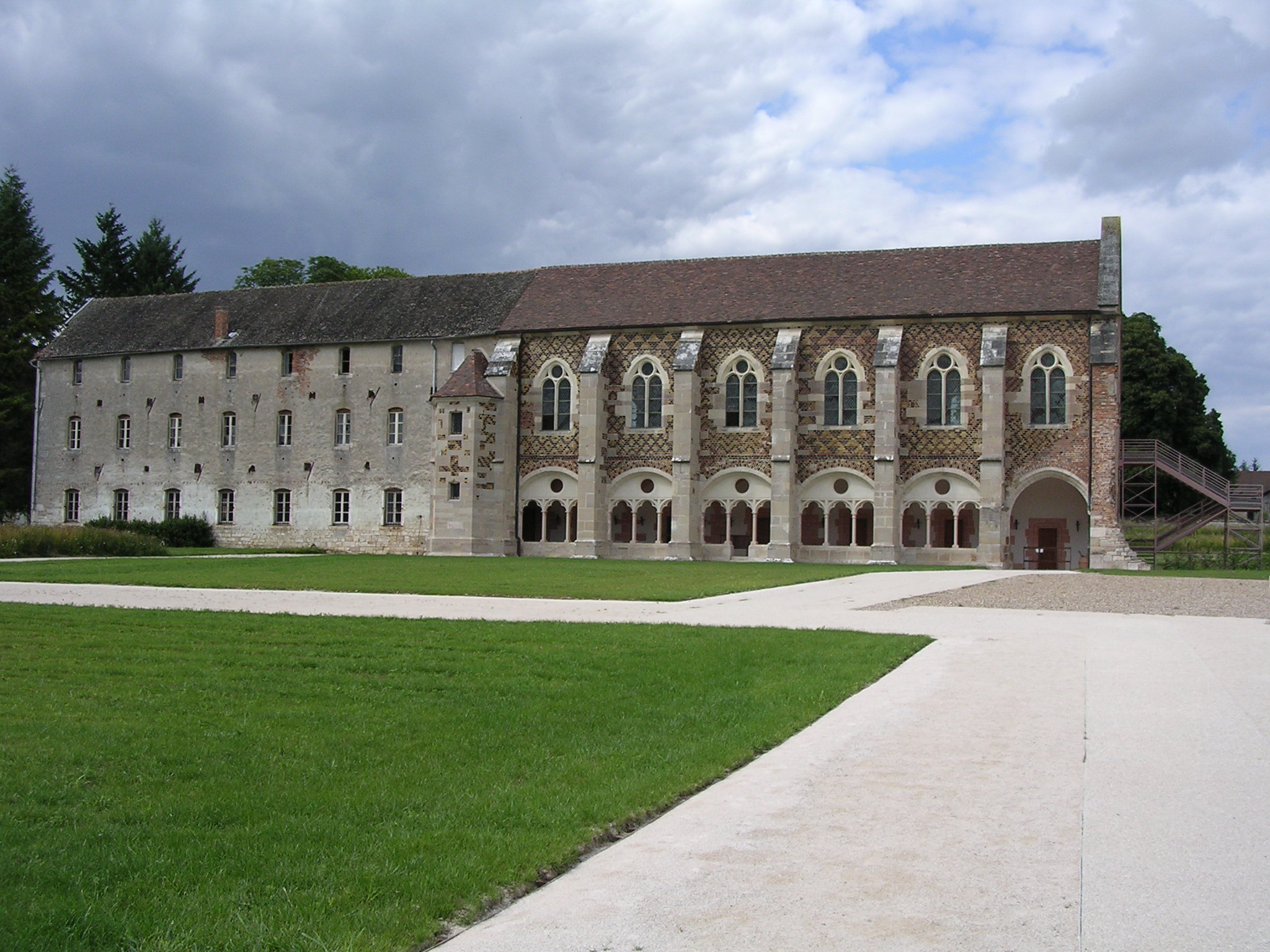
The Cîteaux Abbaye Library

Like the Lenoir Building and the Library Building, the Définitoire is listed as a Historic Monument under French heritage legislation, by decree date 28 December 1978.

== Restoration ==
The Définitoire is currently undergoing restoration. The foundation stone of the project was symbolically laid on 21 March 2025, marking the 927th anniversary of the founding of Cîteaux Abbey. This project aims to preserve and rehabilitate the building while also providing it with a new cultural and scientific purpose. Once the works are completed, the building will house an exhibition space dedicated to the history of the Abbey and the Cistercien Order, as well as facilities for research and interpretation and study of Cistercian heritage, notably supported by the European Centre for the Promotion of Cistercian Culture (CERCCIS - Centre Européen pour le Rayonnement de la Culture Cistercienne)

== Appendix ==
=== Radio Programmes ===
- RCF en Bourgogne, “Définitoire de Cîteaux – 01 – Brother Benoît, the History”, in Plein soleil, published online on 6 July 2026. URL: https://www.rcf.fr/culture/plein-soleil?episode=700111
- RCF en Bourgogne, “Définitoire de Cîteaux – 02 – Martin Bacot, Historic Monuments Architect”, in Plein soleil, published online on 7 July 2026. URL: https://www.rcf.fr/culture/plein-soleil?episode=701225
- RCF en Bourgogne, “Définitoire de Cîteaux – 03 – Ismael Ouberdon, Joiner and Carpenter”, in Plein soleil, published online on 8 July 2026. URL: https://www.rcf.fr/culture/plein-soleil?episode=700973
- RCF en Bourgogne, “Définitoire de Cîteaux – 04 – Denis Coulomb, Masonry Site Manager”, in Plein soleil, published online on 9 July 2026. URL: https://www.rcf.fr/culture/plein-soleil?episode=701194
- RCF en Bourgogne, “Définitoire de Cîteaux – 05 – Brother Benoît, the Project”, in Plein soleil, published online on 10 July 2026. URL: https://www.rcf.fr/culture/plein-soleil?episode=701226

=== Bibliography ===
- Rey, Coraline. "Les bâtiments de l'abbaye de Cîteaux : bilan et nouvelles données issues des sources comptables, XIIe-XVe siècle." Bulletin du Centre d'Etudes Médiévales d'Auxerre / BUCEMA [online], vol. 25.1, 2021. Published online on 25 June 2021. Accessed 26 June 2026. URL : http://journals.openedition.org/cem/18424
- Arabeyre, Patrick (1998). Plouvier, Martine; Saint-Denis, Alain (eds.). Pour une histoire monumentale de l'abbaye de Cîteaux [Towards a monumental history of Cîteaux Abbey]. Vitreux: C̄iteaux : Commentarii cisterciense. ISBN 978-90-800413-9-4. OCLC 797592482.

=== See also ===
- Cîteaux Abbey
- Order of Cistercians
- Order of Cistercians of the Strict Observance
