= Jules Harder =

French-American chef (1844–1918)

Jules Arthur Harder (January 1844 – 9 June 1918) was a French-American chef who was the first chef of the Palace Hotel in San Francisco, when it first opened in 1876. He had previously been chef at Delmonico's and the Union Club in New York City, and the Grand Union Hotel in Saratoga. In 1885, he authored The Physiology of Taste: Harder’s Book of Practical American Cookery, the first (and only) of a planned six-volume book on cooking.

Harder was born in Saint-Nicolas-lès-Cîteaux, Burgundy, and moved to the United States in 1856. He had a sister, Julia, and brother, Victor Achilles Harder. His nephew George Achilles Harder survived the sinking of the Titanic. Jules died in San Francisco, aged 74.
