= Nicolas I Boucherat =

Nicolas I Boucherat (1515 Pont-sur-Seine, Aube - March 12, 1586) was Abbot of Cîteaux 1571-1583/84 and thereby Abbot General of the Cistercian Order.

== Family background ==
Nicolas I Boucherat, born in 1515 in the small town of Pont-sur-Seine in today's Département of Aube (called Pont-le-Roi until the French Revolution), came from an established family in Champagne that had already produced several high-ranking military officers, civil servants, and clergymen. His uncle, Nicolas Boucherat, was a doctor of theology and abbot of the Cistercian monastery of Notre-Dame de Reclus in the diocese of Troyes; his brother Edmond became Advocate General at the Parlement of Paris in 1557.

== Early years as a Cistercian, then procurator general ==
Boucherat entered the abbey of Le Reclus, where his uncle was the abbot. In 1534 Nicolas received his doctorate in Paris. In Reclus he became prior; later he worked in the Vatican as procurator general of his order, but it is not known when. In any case, he is documented as one of the few Cistercians who took part in the sessions of the Council of Trent.

== Abbot General ==
On December 12, 1571, Boucherat was elected abbot of Cîteaux. In 1572, 1573, and 1574 Boucherat made visitation trips through the Lower German and Upper German provinces. In the spring of 1561 or 1569, Boucherat visited the Cistercian abbeys in the Papal States and the kingdoms of Naples and Sicily. In many cases, these were commendatory abbeys, i.e. those that were managed as financial investments and had little monastic life. The visitation report has been preserved. Where monks were still present in these monasteries, Boucherat endeavored to improve discipline.

He endeavored to reintroduce regular general chapters. In 1573, only 19 abbots attended, the next chapter took place only after five years, with 25 abbots, and again in 1584 with 24 abbots.

On January 11, 1578, he received a patent from King Henry III, which guaranteed the abbot and all his successors the position of being doyen of the Parliament of Burgundy. The speech that Boucherat delivered to the king on June 18, 1578, appeared in print that same year, together with the king's (disapproving) reply. Boucherat's efforts to implement the decrees of the Council of Trent in France were unsuccessful.

In Cîteaux, Abbot Boucherat had a new high altar with a large reredos and 25-foot copper figures erected, as well as his own tomb with his life-size statue, also made of copper, on the Gospel side of the abbey church. The annalist Nicolas Cotheret records the cost of both works at 12,300 livres. In 1576, the Grangie Toutenant, one of the oldest granges in Cîteaux, and other properties had to be sold to pay off debts. They were the consequences of a long period of mismanagement by the abbey. In 1576, soldiers occupied the abbey and looted all the supplies, but left the buildings intact.

In December 1583, Boucherat resigned after securing an annual pension of 1200 livres. He also bought a mill in Gilly in 1584, the proceeds of which were to be used to celebrate masses for his salvation for all eternity. This arrangement was confirmed by the Chapter General in the same year. Nicolas Boucherat died on March 12, 1586 and was buried in the abbey church near the high altar. His tomb, like the copper altar statues, was destroyed by Huguenots in 1589, but replaced by a replica in 1601.

== Works ==
- Remonstrance faite au roy le 18 de iuin 1578 en la ville de Rouen par Frère Nicolas Boucherat, abbé de Cisteaux : pour & au nom des estats de Bourgogne : ensemble la responce de Sa Maiesté [S.l. : s.n.], 1578 und Dijon, J. des Planches, 1579. [Digitalisat]

== Literature ==
- Dictionnaire des Auteurs Cisterciens, edited by Émile Brouette, Anselme Dimier (vol. 1) and Eugène Manning. Rochefort, 1975–1977 (Émile Brouette).
- Eberl, Immo, Die Zisterzienser: Geschichte eines europäischen Ordens, Thorbecke, Stuttgart 2002, pp. 393–394.
- La Chesnaye-Desbois, Franc̜ois-Alexandre-Aubert de, Dictionnaire de la noblesse, contenant les généalogies, l'histoire & la chronologie des familles nobles de France, vol. IV, 2nd edition, Paris: La veuve Duchesne, 1772, pp. 666–671.
- Lekai, Louis J., Nicolas Cotheret's Annals of Citeaux. Kalamazoo, Michigan 1982 (Cistercian Studies; 57), pp. 66–69.
- Postina, Alois, "Beiträge zur Geschichte der Cistercienserklöster des 16. Jahrhunderts in Italien", Cistercienser Chronik 13 (1901), pp. 193–205, 225–237, 257–266.
- Zakar, Polykarp, "Generaläbte der Zisterzienser auf dem Konzil von Trient. Zur Vorgeschichte der Fürstenfelder Äbteversammlung von 1595", Analecta Cisterciensia 52 (1996), pp. 49–175, at 64–70.
