= Marchenoir =

- Commune
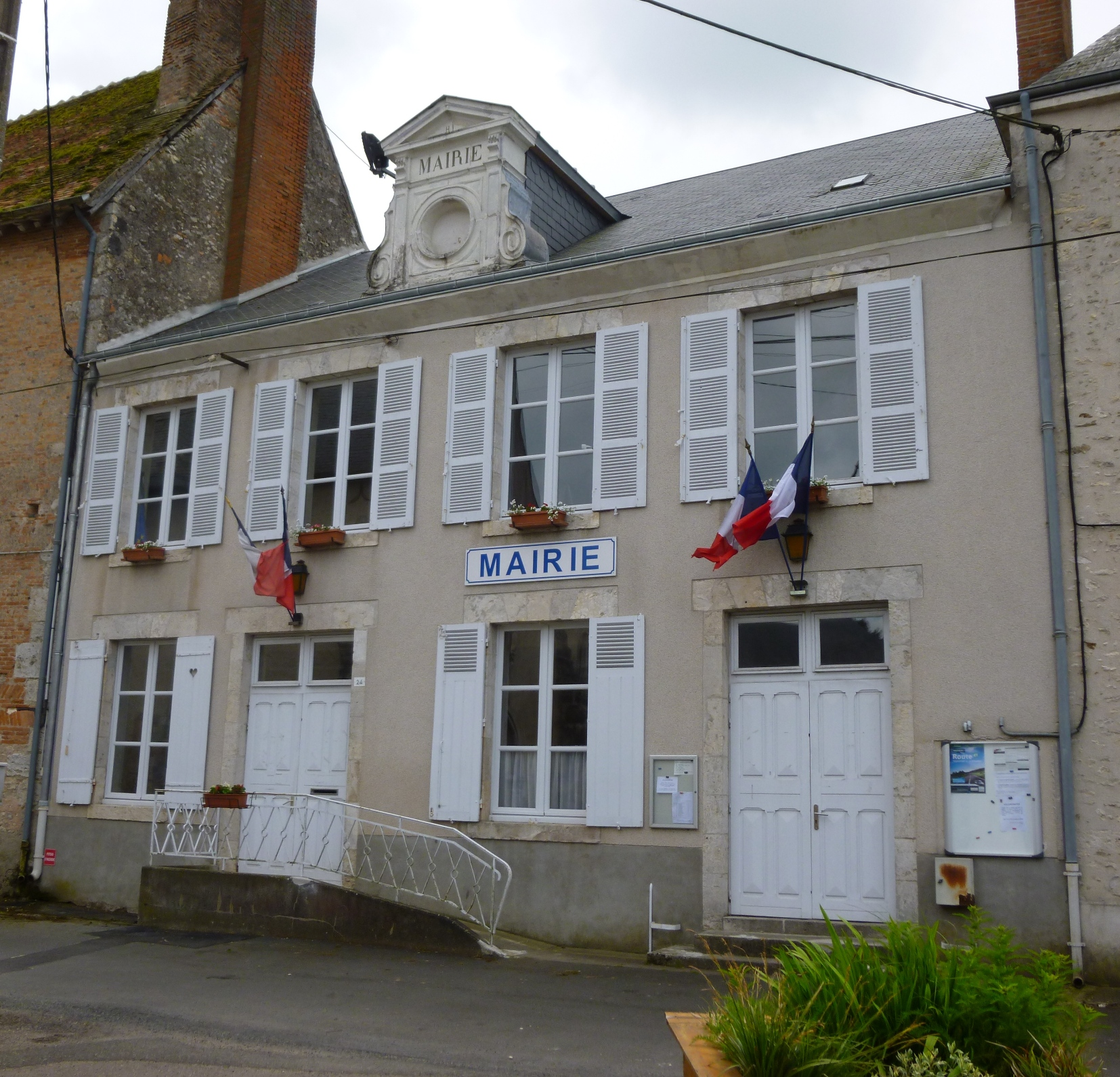
- Town hall

- Coat of arms
- Location of Marchenoir
- Location within France Location within Centre-Val de Loire
- Coordinates: 47°49′27″N 1°23′44″E
- Country: France
- Region: Centre-Val de Loire
- Department: Loir-et-Cher
- Arrondissement: Blois
- Canton: La Beauce
- Intercommunality: Beauce Val de Loire

Government
  - Mayor (2020–2026): Julien Catala
- Area^{1}: 9.42 km^{2} (3.64 sq mi)
- Elevation: 135 m (443 ft)
- Highest elevation: 151 m (495 ft)
- Lowest elevation: 124 m (407 ft)
- Population (2023): 677
  - Density: 71.9/km^{2} (186/sq mi)
- Time zone: UTC+01:00 (CET)
  - Summer (DST): UTC+02:00 (CEST)
- INSEE/Postal code: 41123 /41370
- ^{1} French Land Register data, which excludes lakes, ponds, glaciers > 1 km^{2} (0.386 sq mi or 247 acres) and river estuaries.

Marchenoir (French pronunciation: [maʁʃənwaʁ]) is a commune in the Loir-et-Cher department of central France. The nearby forest of Marchenoir was the site of L'Aumône Abbey, a Cistercian daughter house of Cîteaux Abbey. The Earl of Buckingham stayed at the Abbey in 1380 whilst his army was quartered in the Forest.

== History ==
In 1650 Claude Pajon was appointed to be pastor to the Reformed Church at Marchenoir.

The husband and wife comedians Raymond Bussières and Annette Poivre are buried in the Marchenoir cemetery.

== Population ==
Historical population
Year	Pop.	±% p.a.
1968	669	—
1975	667	−0.04%
1982	633	−0.74%
1990	627	−0.12%
1999	632	+0.09%
2007	687	+1.05%
2012	664	−0.68%
2017	659	−0.15%
2023	677	+0.45%
Source: INSEE

== See also ==
- Communes of the Loir-et-Cher department
