= Raynald of Bar =

French abbot

Blessed Raynald of Bar (Note: Also spelled Rainald, Renaud, Raynard, Reinard or Rainhard.) (died 16 December 1150) was the fifth Abbot of Cîteaux from 1134 until his death. He succeeded the deposed Guy and under him the Cistercian Order prospered and grew.

Raynald was the second son of Count Milo II of Bar-sur-Seine and Matilda of Noyers. He became a monk at Clairvaux Abbey and a personal friend of Bernard of Clairvaux.

Raynald is generally credited with compiling the Instituta generalis capituli apud Cistercium, the earliest collection of the decisions of the Cistercian general chapter, and may also be credited with the shorter Capitula, a summary and rearrangement of the Instituta.

== Sources ==
- Elder, E. Rozanne, ed. (2012). The Great Beginning of Cîteaux: A Narrative of the Beginning of the Cistercian Order. The Exordium Magnum of Conrad of Eberbach. Translated by Benedicta Ward; Paul Savage. Collegeville, MN: Liturgical Press.
- Perry, Guy (2018). The Briennes: The Rise and Fall of a Champenois Dynasty in the Age of the Crusades, c.950–1356. Cambridge University Press.
- Williams, Watkin (1938). "The First Cistercian Era". Monastic Studies. Manchester University Press. pp. 44–51.
