= Gilbert the Great =

Gilbert the Great (died 17 October 1167) was an English monk and theologian who served as the ninth abbot of Cîteaux from 1163 until his death.

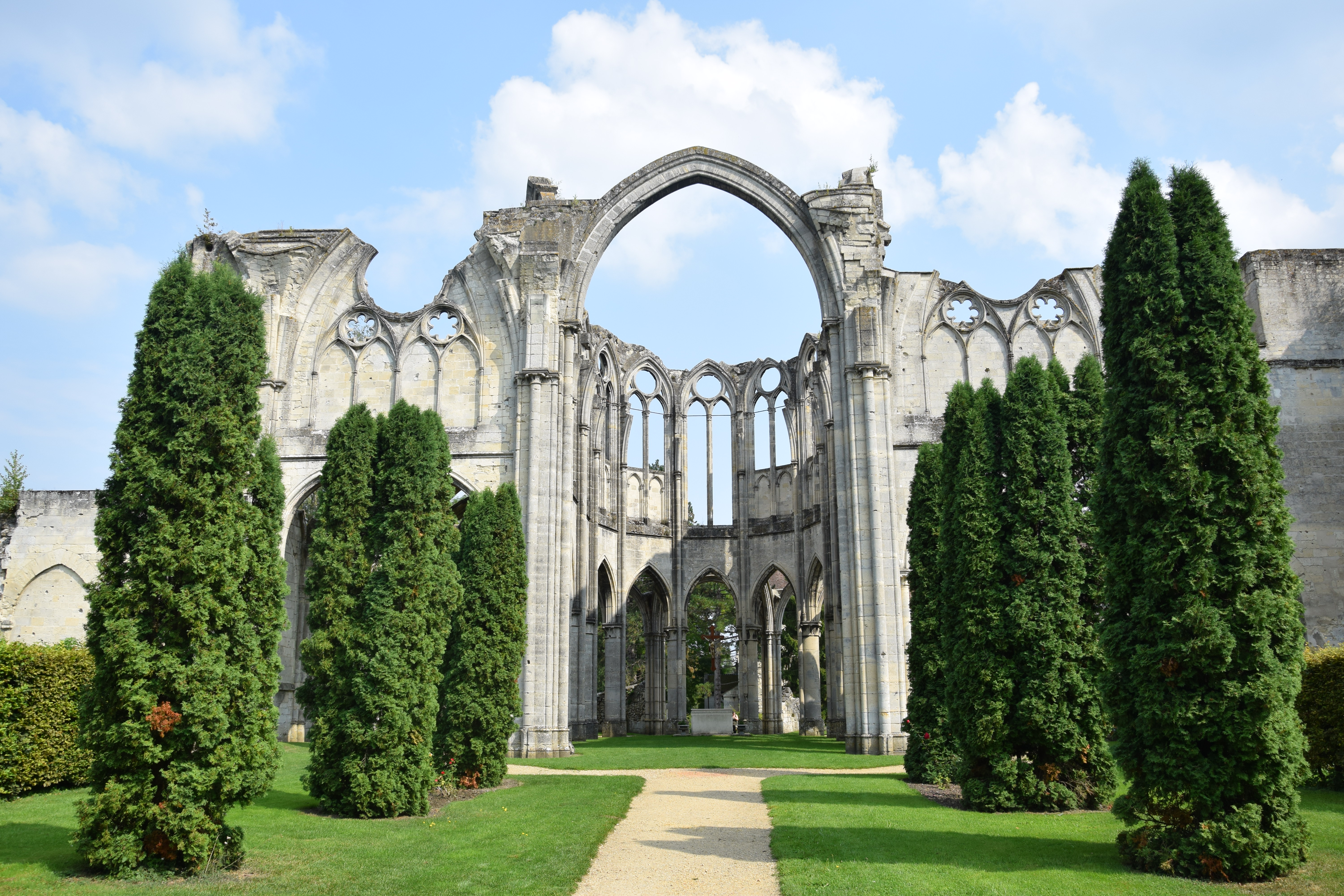
Ourscamp today

Prior to coming to Cîteaux, Gilbert served as the abbot of Ourscamp Abbey from 1143. In 1164, he wrote the statutes of the Order of Calatrava. In 1165, he received from Pope Alexander III the exemption of the Cistercians from episcopal jurisdiction. When, in 1166, the dispute between King Henry II of England and Archbishop Thomas Becket embroiled the Cistercians, Gilbert asked Becket to leave Pontigny Abbey, where he was staying.

Gilbert was nicknamed "the Great" in his own time, but the reason is unknown. Of his writings, three letters to King Louis VII of France are preserved. A biblical commentary and some works on theological distinctions have been attributed to him, but these attributions are uncertain. John Bale credited him with a commentary on the Song of Songs.
