= Palace Hotel, San Francisco =

Hotel in California, United States

The Palace Hotel
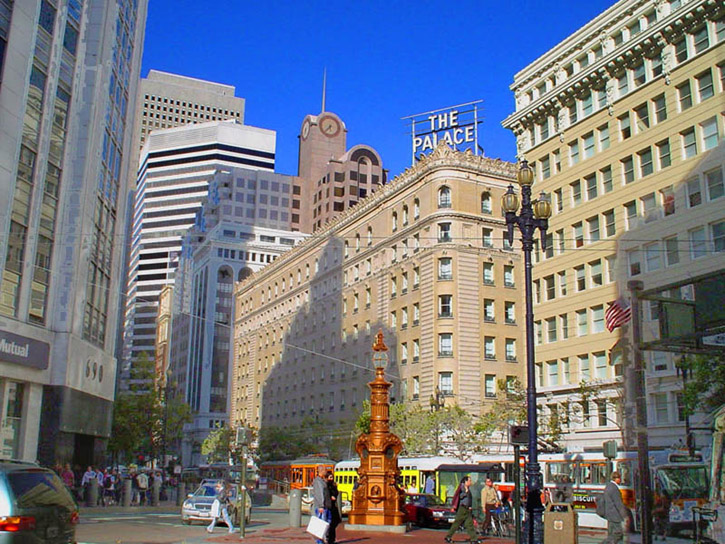
- The Palace Hotel on Market Street in San Francisco, 2008

- Location within San Francisco Location within California Location within the United States

General information
- Location: United States, 2 New Montgomery Street; San Francisco, California
- Coordinates: 37.7884°N 122.4020°W
- Opened: December 19, 1909; 116 years ago
- Owner: Kyo-Ya Hotels & Resorts
- Operator: Marriott International

Height
- Height: 35 m (115 ft)

Technical details
- Floor count: 9
- Floor area: 592,000 sq ft (55,000 m^{2})

Design and construction
- Architect: Trowbridge & Livingston

Other information
- Number of rooms: 556
- Number of suites: 53
- Number of restaurants: The Garden Court; Pied Piper Bar & Grill

Website
- www.sfpalace.com ThePalaceHotel.org (History)

San Francisco Designated Landmark
- Designated: 1969
- Reference no.: 18

The Palace Hotel is a landmark historic hotel in San Francisco, California, located at the southwest corner of Market and New Montgomery streets. The hotel is also referred to as the New Palace Hotel to distinguish it from the original 1875 Palace Hotel, which had been demolished after being gutted by the fire caused by the 1906 San Francisco earthquake. A temporary hotel, called the "Baby" Palace Hotel, was erected at a nearby site as accommodations until an adequate replacement could be built.

The present structure opened on December 19, 1909, on the same site as its predecessor. The hotel was closed from January 1989 to April 1991 to undergo a two-year renovation and seismic retrofit. Occupying most of a city block, the hotel's now more than century-old, nine-story main building stands immediately adjacent to both the BART Montgomery Street Station and the Monadnock Building, and across Market Street from Lotta's Fountain. The Palace Hotel is a member of Historic Hotels of America, the official program of the National Trust for Historic Preservation.

== The original Palace Hotel (1875–1906) ==
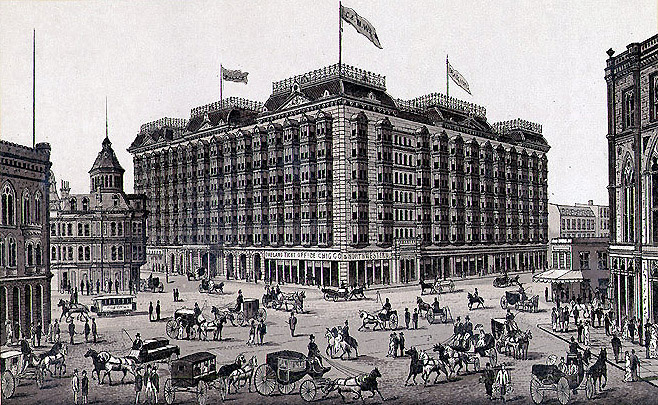
The 1875 Palace Hotel

The original Palace Hotel was built by San Francisco banker and entrepreneur William Chapman Ralston, who heavily depended on his shaky banking empire to help finance the $5 million project. Although Ralston's Bank of California collapsed in late August 1875, and Ralston himself drowned in San Francisco Bay on the same day that he lost control of the institution, it did not interfere with the opening of the Palace Hotel two months later on October 2, 1875. Ralston's business partner in the project was U.S. Senator William Sharon, who had helped cause the collapse of the bank when he dumped his stock in the Comstock Lode. Sharon ended up in full control of the hotel as well as both the bank and Ralston's debts, both of which he paid off at just pennies on the dollar.

With 755 guest rooms, the original Palace Hotel (also known colloquially as the "Bonanza Inn") was at the time of its construction the largest hotel in the Western United States. At 120 feet (37 m) in height, the hotel was San Francisco's tallest building for over a decade. The skylighted open center of the building featured a Grand Court overlooked by seven stories of white columned balconies which served as an elegant carriage entrance. Shortly after 1900 this area was converted into a lounge called the "Palm Court". The first chef was Jules Harder and the bartender, William "Cocktail" Boothby, was a fixture at the hotel for some years. The hotel featured large redwood-paneled hydraulic elevators which were known as "rising rooms". Each guest room or suite was equipped with a private bathroom as well as an electric call button to summon a member of the hotel's staff. All guest rooms could be joined to create suites, or to make up large apartments for long-term residents, and the parlor of each guest room featured a large bay window overlooking the street below.

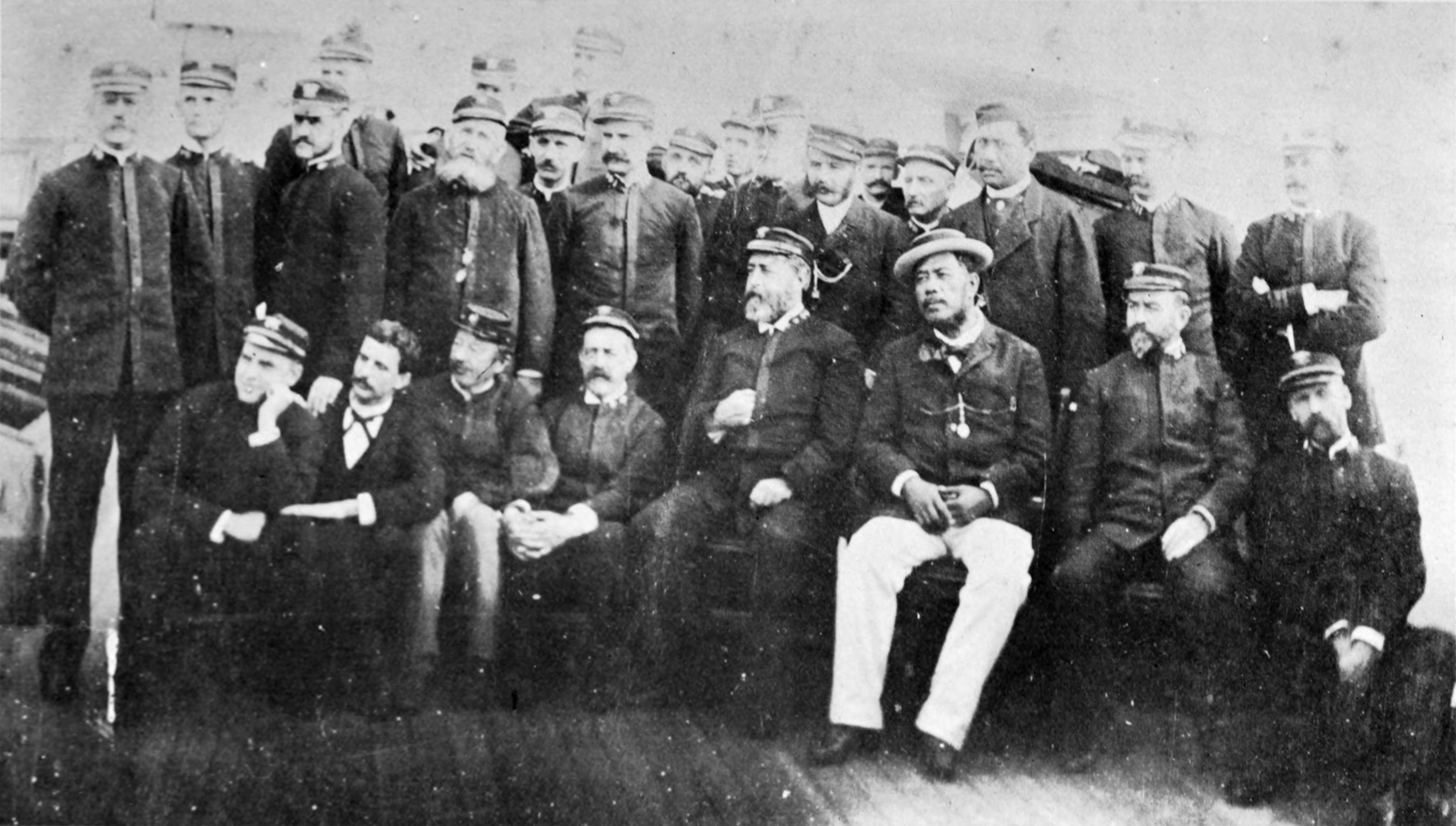
Mōʻī, David Kalakaua (in white slacks), aboard the USS Charleston en route to San Francisco, died at the Palace Hotel after suffering a stroke in Santa Barbara.

On November 25, 1890, Mōʻī (King) David Kalakaua visited California aboard the U.S.S. Charleston with business between the Kingdom of Hawaii and the US Government. Kalakaua, whose health had been declining, stayed in a suite at the Palace Hotel. Traveling throughout Mexico and Southern California and reportedly drinking excessively, the monarch suffered a stroke in Santa Barbara and was rushed back to San Francisco. Kalakaua fell into a coma in his suite on January 18 and died two days later on January 20, 1891. The official cause of death as listed by US Navy officials was that the king had died from Bright's disease (inflammation of the kidneys).

Financed primarily by Bank of California co-founder William Ralston, it offered many innovative modern conveniences including an intercom system and four oversized hydraulic elevators called lifting rooms. The most notable feature of the hotel was the Grand Court that served as an entry area for horse-drawn carriages. The area was converted to the palm filled "Garden Court" a few years before the 1906 earthquake.

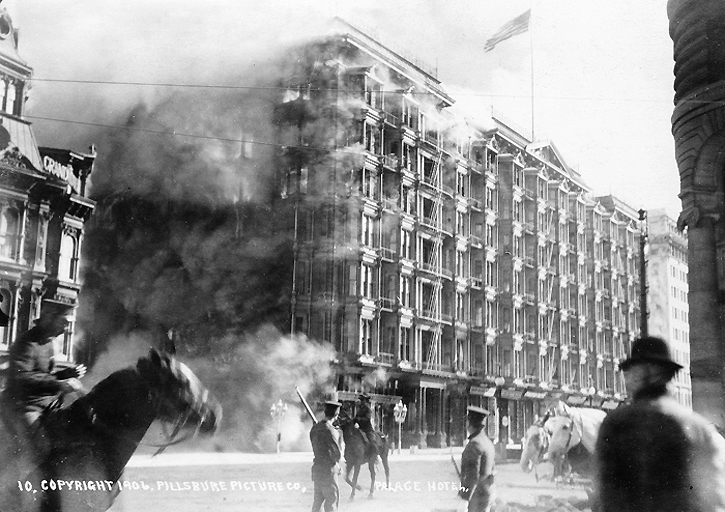
1906 fire

The Palace Hotel in San Francisco was praised by industrialist Andrew Carnegie in his travelogue Round the World, where he described the building as unmatched worldwide in its structural design compared to contemporary establishments such as the Windsor Hotel and the Grand Hotel in Paris. Free guided tours of the hotel are offered by volunteers from San Francisco City Guides, a program operated under the San Francisco Public Library.

Although the hotel survived the initial damage from the early morning April 18, 1906, San Francisco earthquake, by late that afternoon it had been consumed by the subsequent fires. Notably, tenor Enrico Caruso (who had sung the role of Don José in Carmen the night before) was staying in the hotel at the time of the quake, and swore never to return to the city. The urban legend is Caruso, "stood in his nightshirt holding a personally autographed photograph of President Theodore Roosevelt and demanded special treatment."

== The "baby" Palace Hotel (1906–1907) ==
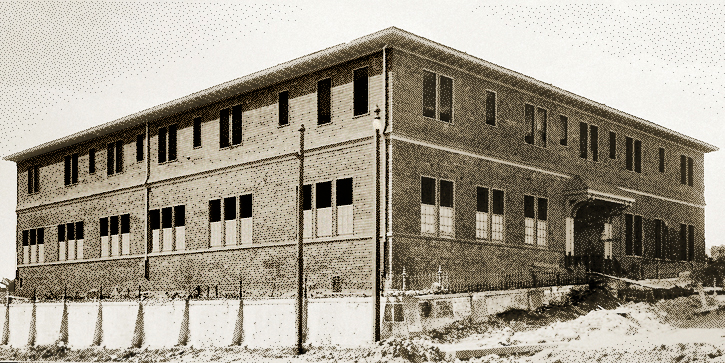
The "Baby" Palace Hotel

While the ruins of the original hotel were being razed and its permanent replacement built, a temporary 23-room facility known as the "Little" or "Baby" Palace Hotel was quickly designed and constructed about eight blocks west of the Market Street site at the NW corner of Post and Leavenworth Streets. A modest two-story frame structure, the "Baby" Palace was opened with considerable fanfare on November 17, 1906, just seven months after the earthquake and fire had devastated the city.

The hotel only remained open to the public until July 1907, however, when the Palace Hotel Company leased the nearby Fairmont Hotel on Nob Hill for ten years, and in turn leased the Post Street building to The Olympic Club for five years as a temporary clubhouse while that organization's facility was also being rebuilt. Within a decade of its construction, the building had already been replaced by a four-story brick apartment block built in 1916, which still occupies much of the northwest corner lot at Post and Leavenworth streets where the "Baby" Palace Hotel had briefly stood.

== The "new" Palace Hotel (opened 1909) ==
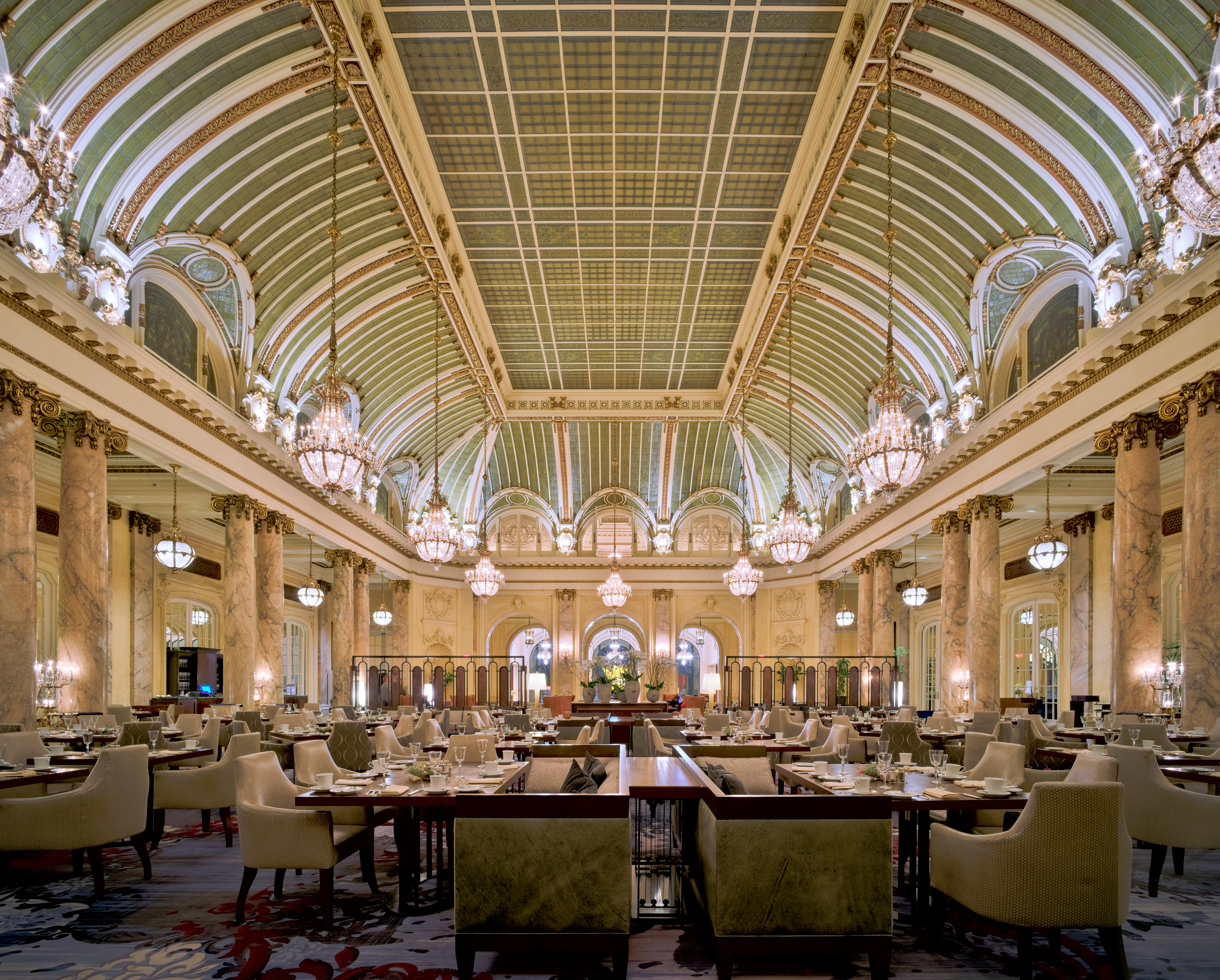
The Garden Court Restaurant, also known as the "Palm Court"

Completely rebuilt from the ground up, the "New" Palace Hotel opened on December 19, 1909, and quickly resumed the role of its namesake predecessor as an important San Francisco landmark, as well as host to many of the city's events. While externally much plainer than the original Palace, the new "Bonanza Inn" is similarly elegant, sumptuous, and gracious on the inside to the 1875 building. The "Garden Court" (also called the "Palm Court")—which occupies the same area that the Grand Court did in the earlier structure—has been called one of San Francisco's most prestigious hotel dining rooms since the day it opened.

Also well known was the "Pied Piper" Bar located just off the gleaming polished marble lobby, which was dominated by Maxfield Parrish's 16-by-6-foot (4.9 by 1.8 m), 250-pound (110 kg) painting of the same name.

The Ralston Room, named for co-founder William Ralston, is off the main lobby to the left of the painting.

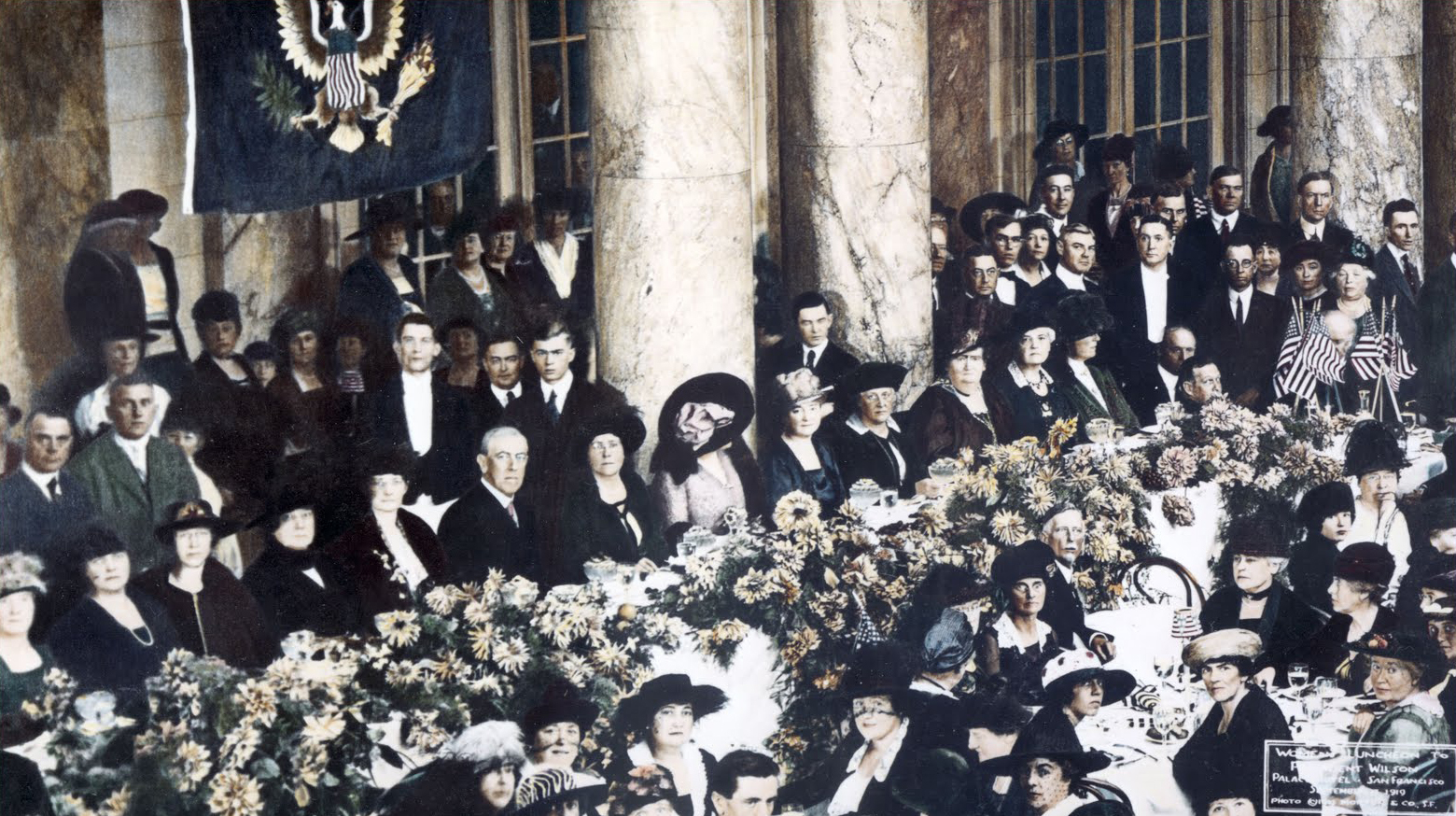
President Woodrow Wilson hosting a luncheon to support the Versailles Treaty at the Garden Court of the Palace Hotel in 1919

The hotel served as the stage for several important events. In 1919, Woodrow Wilson gave speeches in the Garden Court in support of the Treaty of Versailles and the League of Nations. In 1923, Warren G. Harding's term as president ended suddenly when he died at the Palace Hotel, in Room 8064, an eighth floor suite that overlooks Market Street. In 1945, the Palace Hotel hosted a banquet to mark the opening session of the United Nations.

The Palace was sold to Sheraton Hotels in 1954 and became the Sheraton-Palace Hotel. Soviet Premier Nikita Khrushchev spoke at a banquet at the Sheraton-Palace during his American tour in 1959. The Garden Court was declared a San Francisco Landmark in 1969. In 1973, not long after Sheraton was bought by ITT, it sold the Palace to the Japanese Kyo-Ya group, along with all of their hotels in the Hawaiian islands. Sheraton continued to manage the hotel and the name stayed the same. The entire structure of the Sheraton-Palace was declared a landmark in 1984.

The Sheraton-Palace Hotel closed on January 8, 1989, for a $150 million restoration that garnered national media attention and numerous awards. It reopened on April 3, 1991, as the Sheraton Palace Hotel, without the hyphen in its name. The Sheraton Palace was placed in The Luxury Collection division of ITT Sheraton when it was founded in 1992. The hotel dropped the Sheraton name in 1995, becoming again the Palace Hotel.

A 60 story, 204 to 207 m (669 to 679 ft) residential tower addition was proposed in 2006, to be named the Palace Hotel Residential Tower, designed by the architecture firm Skidmore, Owings & Merrill. Construction never began due to the Great Recession.

The hotel's owners controversially removed the famed Pied Piper mural on March 23, 2013, for sale at a planned auction at Christie's. It was anticipated that the painting might sell for up to $5 million. In the light of strong public opposition to the painting's removal, however, the hotel's owners relented and instead had the painting cleaned, restored, and returned to the bar where it was rehung with considerable fanfare on August 22, 2013.

In 2015, the hotel underwent an extensive renovation designed by Beatrice Girelli of Indidesign to its guest rooms, indoor pool and fitness center, lobby, promenade, and The Garden Court, and also became part of the Marriott chain when Marriott acquired Starwood. In 2016, the Palace was named the Best Historic Hotel in the over 400 guest room category by Historic Hotels of America, an official program of the U.S. National Trust for Historic Preservation.

On October 20, 2024, workers at the Palace Hotel who were UNITE HERE members joined other San Francisco hotel workers in going on strike. On December 24, 2024, a four-year labor agreement was ratified, bringing the strike to an end.

== In literature and popular culture ==
- The finale of the 1997 David Fincher film The Game, starring Michael Douglas, was shot in the hotel's Garden Court.
- A chase scene in the 1974 Disney movie Herbie Rides Again was filmed inside the hotel, where Herbie, a Volkswagen Beetle, drives through the Garden Court.
- The last chapter of the third part of the main story in the 2007 novel The Gravedigger's Daughter by American writer Joyce Carol Oates takes place at the Palace Hotel.
- In the novel Time of Fog and Fire by writer Rhys Bowen, the protagonist, Molly Murphy Sullivan, travels to San Francisco and stays at the Palace Hotel while searching for her missing husband, days before the 1906 earthquake, describing the aftermath of the city's destruction and chaos.
- The cover photo of Nicolette Larson's 1978 album Nicolette shows the singer in the hotel's Garden Court restaurant.

== Gallery ==
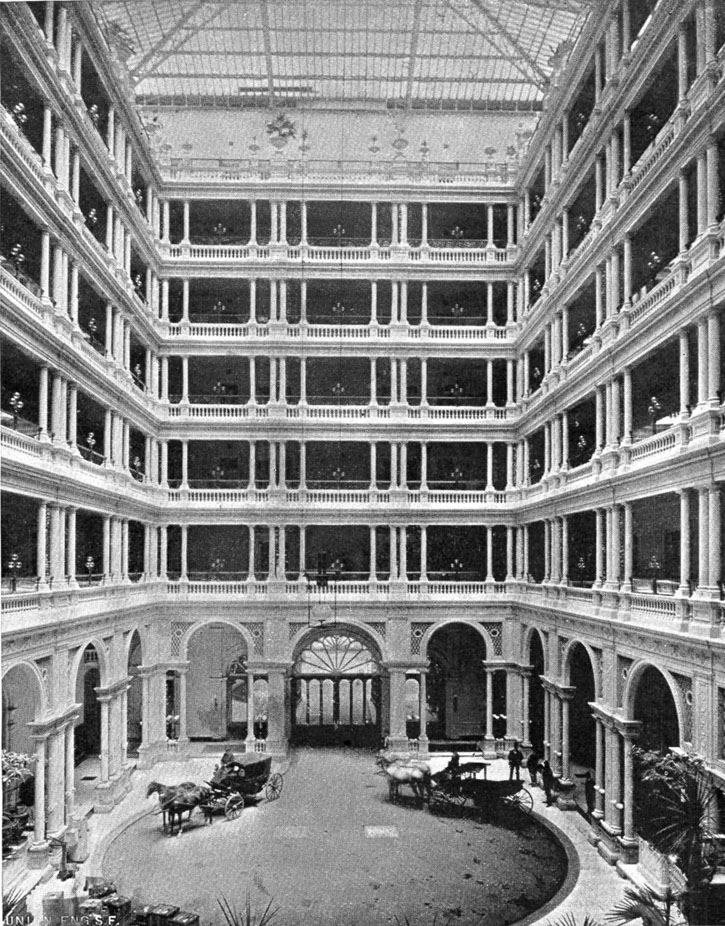
The "Grand Court" of the original Palace Hotel c.1895

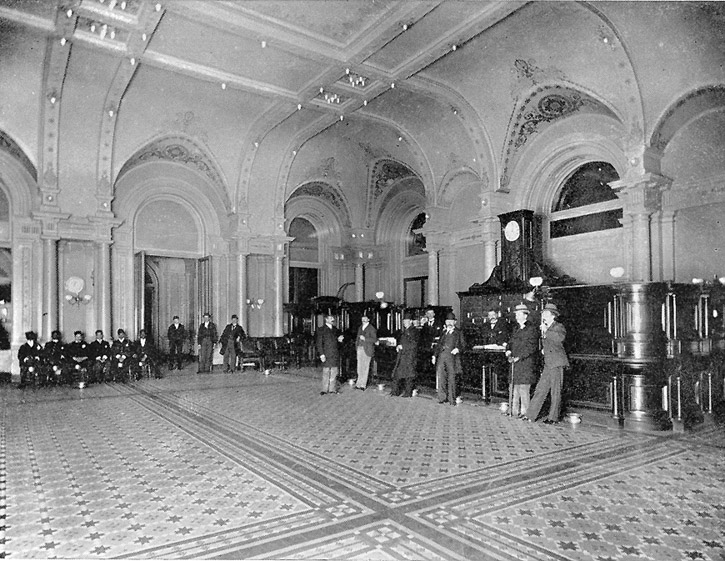
The Reception Desk of the original Palace Hotel c.1895

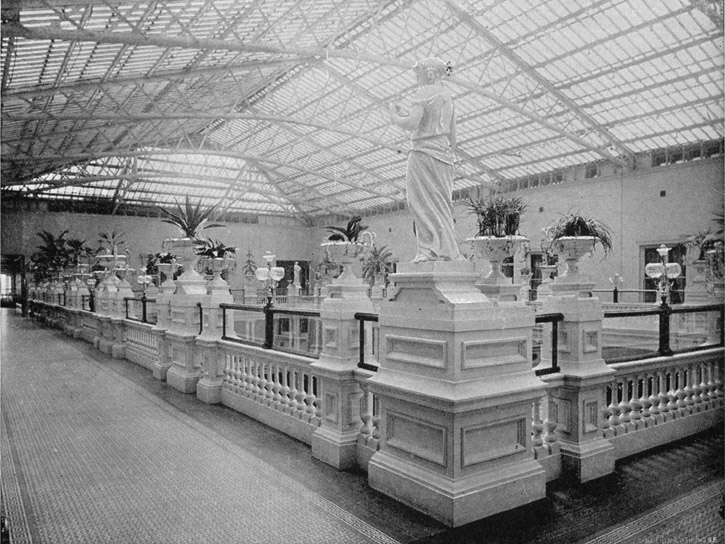
The "Conservatory Floor" (7th floor) of the original Palace Hotel c.1895

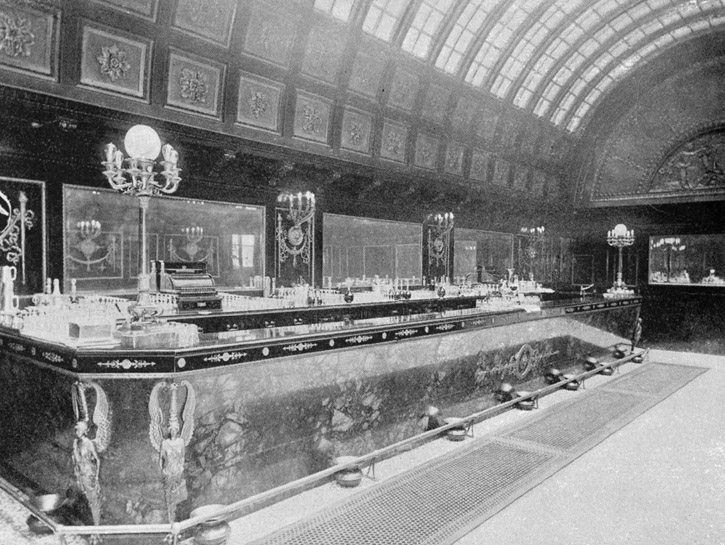
The Bar of the original Palace Hotel c.1895

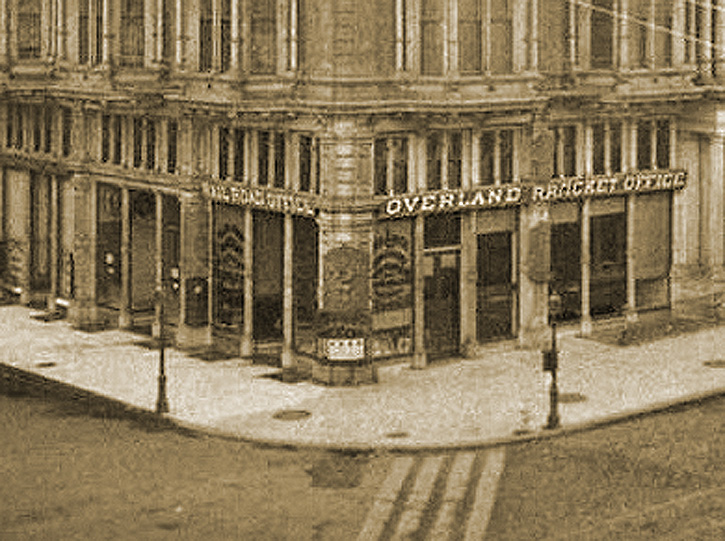
The "Overland Railroad" ticket office at the Palace Hotel, c.1890

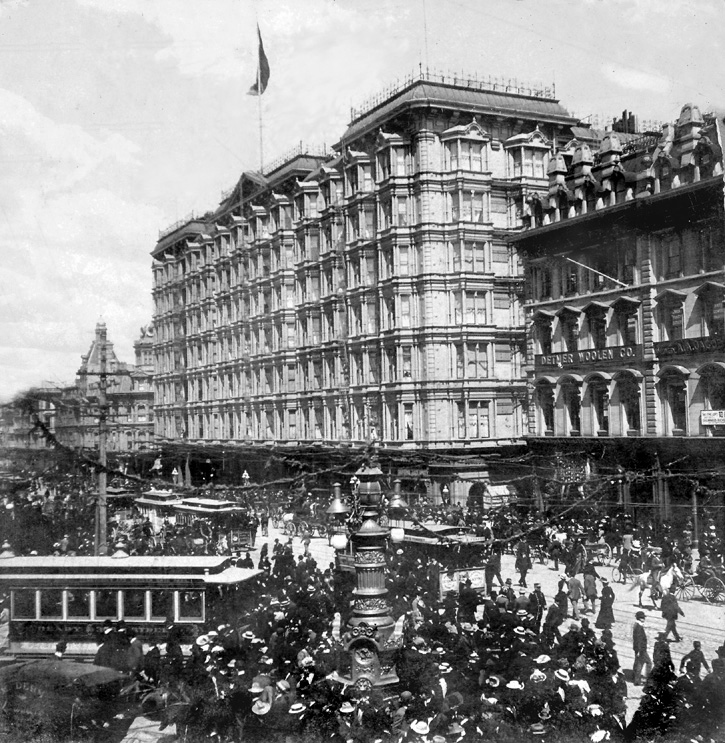
President William McKinley visits the original Palace Hotel 1901

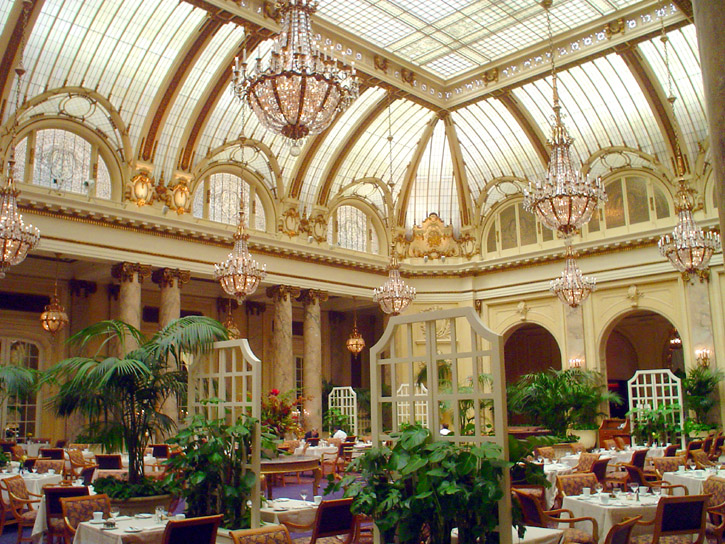
The Garden Court at the new Palace Hotel

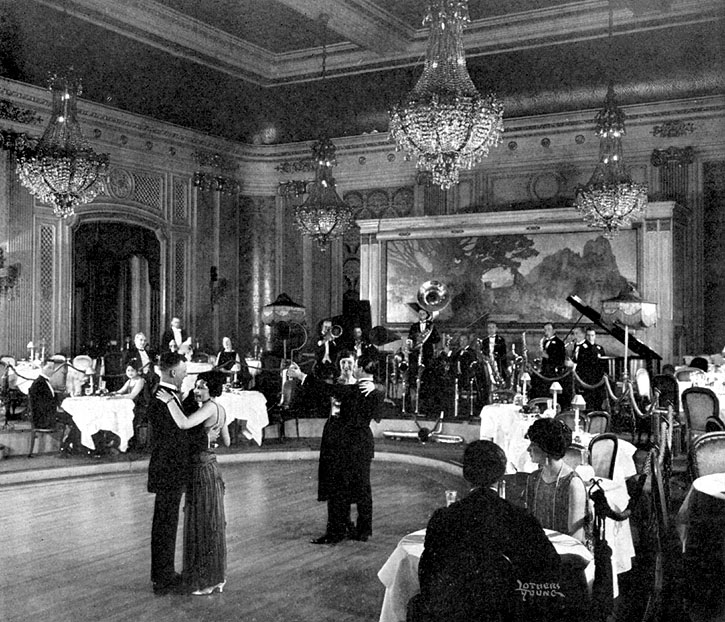
The Ballroom at the new Palace Hotel (1920)

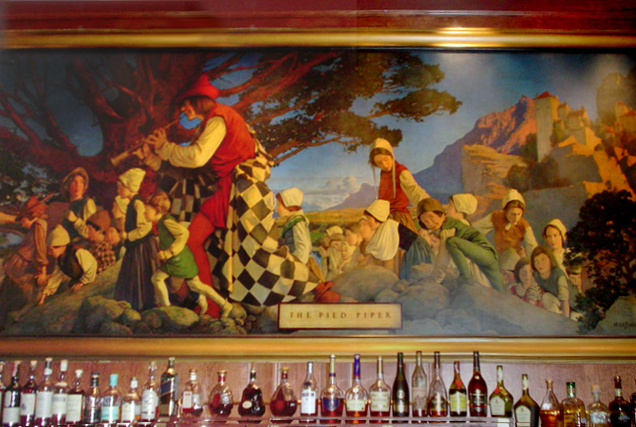
The "Pied Piper" mural by Maxfield Parrish in the "Pied Piper Bar" at the new Palace Hotel

== See also ==
- List of San Francisco Designated Landmarks

== Bibliography ==
- Berger, Molly W (2011). Hotel Dreams: Luxury, Technology, and Urban Ambition in America, 1829–1929. Baltimore: Johns Hopkins University Press. ISBN 978-0-8018-9987-4.
