= Abbey of La Joie-Notre-Dame =

Cistercian abbey in Hennebont, France

Coordinates: 47.8141°N 3.2817°W

Abbey of La Joie-Notre-Dame La Joie Abbey
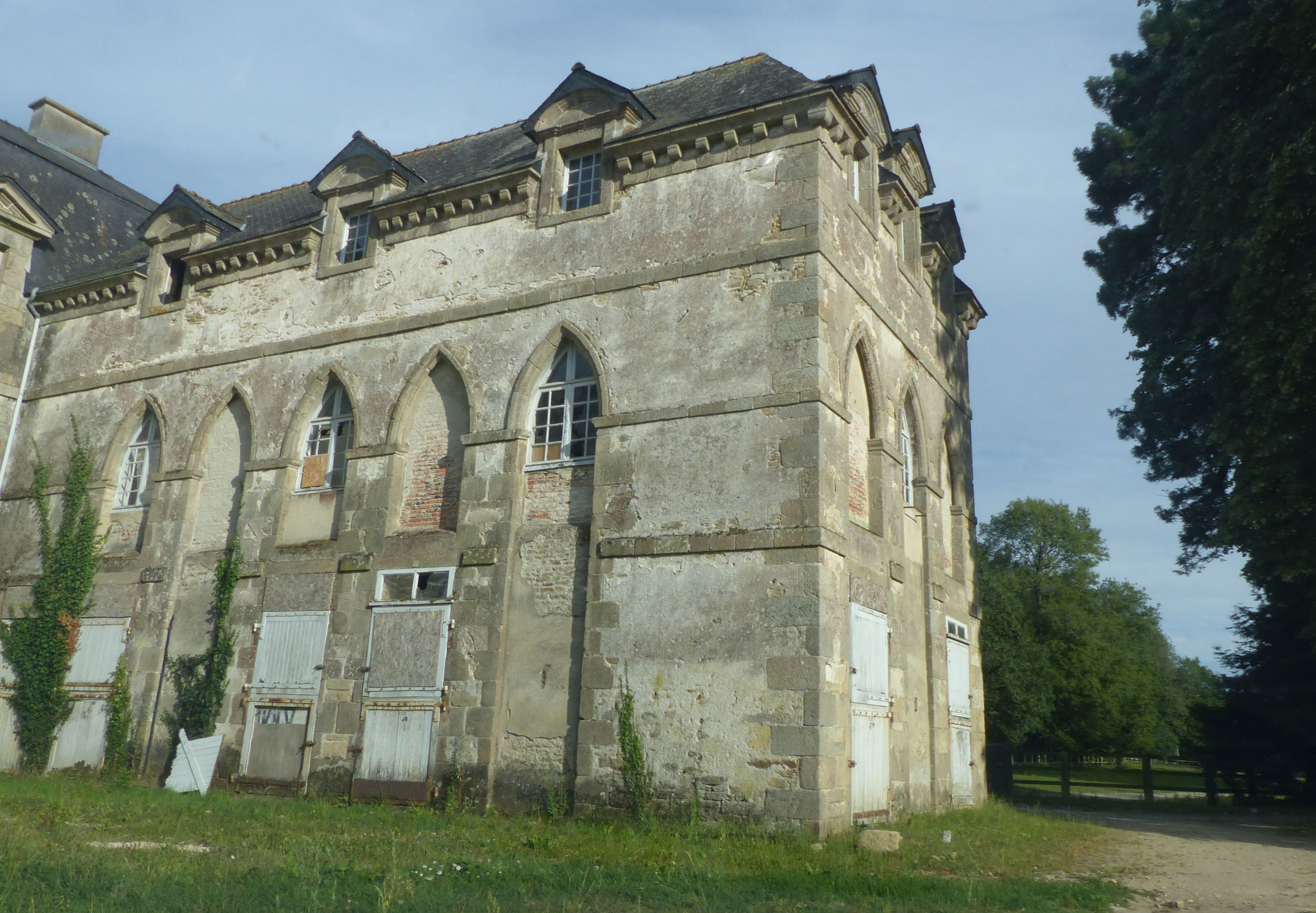

Religion
- Affiliation: Catholic church Historic monument
- District: Hennebont
- Province: Morbihan
- Region: Brittany

Location
- Country: France
- Interactive map of Abbey of La Joie-Notre-Dame; La Joie Abbey

La Joie Abbey, also the Abbey of La Joie-Notre-Dame (French: Abbaye de la Joie, Abbaye de la Joie-Notre-Dame), is a former Cistercian abbey on the territory of Hennebont. It was part of the diocese of Vannes. Today, it is the site of the national stud farm.

The Maison des Confesseurs has been listed as a monument historique since June 27, 1921. It is now owned by the town of Hennebont.

The façades, roofs and staircases of the abbey dwelling and the façades and roofs of the outbuildings have been listed as monuments historiques since November 6, 1995.

== History ==
Notre-Dame-de-Joye Abbey was founded on October 5, 1275, by Blanche de Champagne, wife of John I the Red (1217-† 1286), Duke of Brittany, and mother of John II (1239–1305), Duke of Brittany. The abbey was ravaged by fire in 1512. It was rebuilt in 1693.

The abbey's 17th-century buildings include the gatehouse, the abbot's dwelling and a farm building. In the 19th century, a south wing was added to these buildings.

The site was chosen to become one of France's national stud farms. The choice was initially between the Ursulines de Pontivy enclosure, and the Abbey of Notre-Dame de Langonnet, which was chosen to become a stud farm, but the Langonnet abbey was returned to the Spiritans in 1860 when the stallion depot was moved to Hennebont, around the Abbey de la Joie.

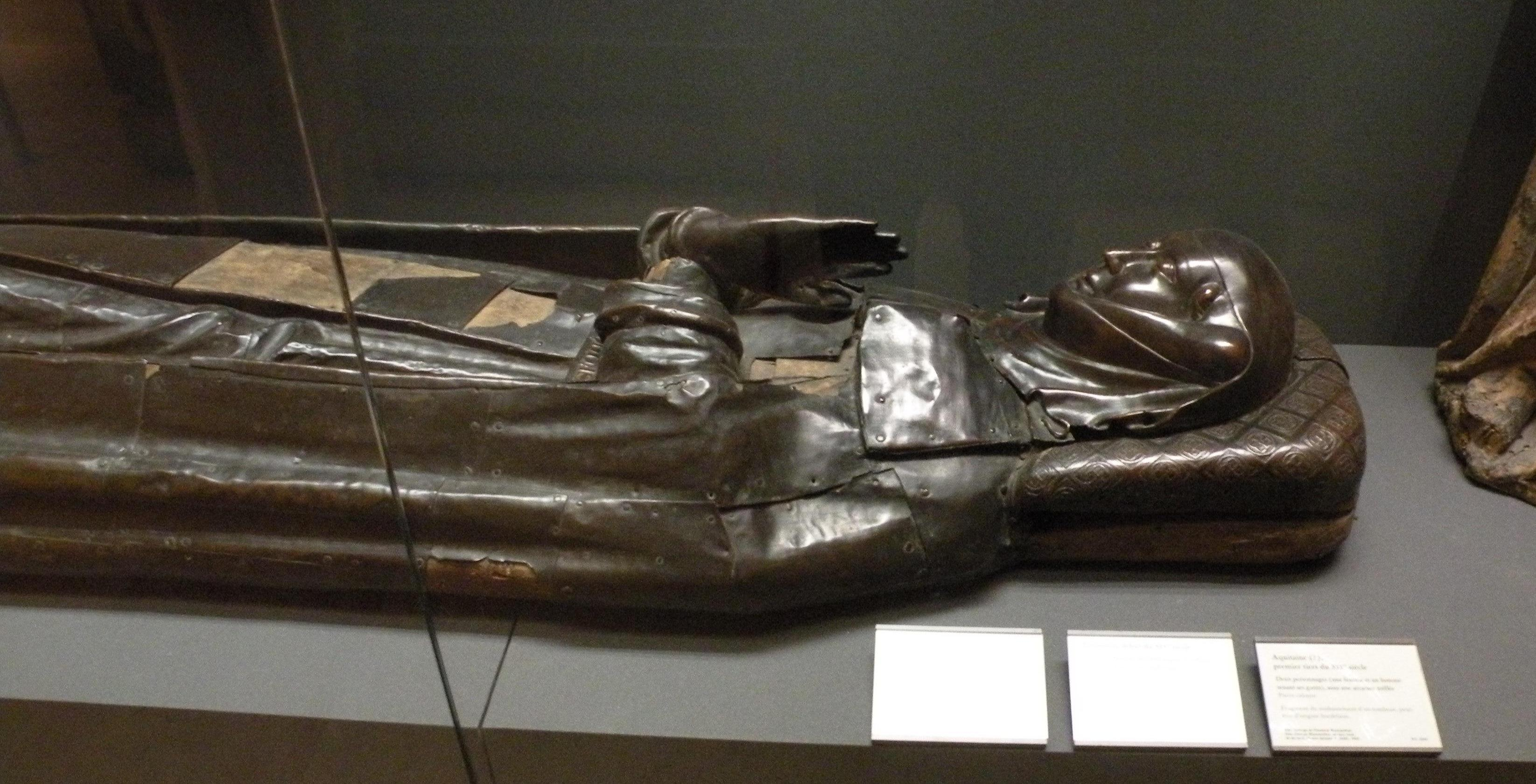
Recumbent statue of Blanche de Champagne Abbey of La Joie-Notre-Dame in Hennebont now in the Louvre Museum.

The first abbess was Sibille de Beaugé (died 1320), daughter of Renaud sire de Beaugé and Sibille de Beaujeu, and first cousin of Duchess Blanche, who occupied the abbey with sisters from the Saint-Antoine-des-Champs abbey in Paris. In 1279, however, the abbey was affiliated to L'Aumône Abbey in the diocese of Chartres, like other Breton Cistercian abbeys. The abbey was rebuilt and enlarged in the seventeenth century (1693), after a fire destroyed the church, sacristy, chapter house, dormitory above and a large part of the cloister on July 25, 1510.

During the French Revolution, following the expulsion of the last abbess and nuns in October 1792, the abbey church was turned over to quarrymen.

In 1835, an "iron factory" was set up in the remaining buildings (abbey dwelling, refectory, dormitories and part of the cloister). When the factory was dismantled, all that remained were the Confessors' house, the abbot's dwelling and a farm building.

Around 1840, the whole complex became private property. The name "Porterie", given to the Maison des Confesseurs, dates from this period. This small pavilion, rebuilt in 1699, as attested by the date engraved on the pediment of one of the dormer windows, was originally the residence of the priests in charge of the Divine Office for the nuns. With the canalization of the Blavet, the installation of the factory and its subsequent transformation into a private residence, the pavilion became one of the entrances and was henceforth known as the porterie.

The Maison des Confesseurs, acquired and restored by the town of Hennebont, has become a place of residence for artists, writers, playwrights, etc., as part of the town's cultural projects.

At the end of the 17th century, Abbess Suzanne de Plœuc commissioned the construction of a new building, the logis abbatial. Of this building, which bears the date 1693 in several places, two main buildings remain, forming an "L" shape. The third is a chapel built after 1840. The abbess's private garden lies to the west of the complex.

In 1856, the National Stud moved to the upper plateau above the abbey site. In 1920, the Haras department, which had taken over the site, installed horse stalls on the first floor, in the salons of the abbey dwelling. The grooms were housed upstairs and in the Confessors' house.

== List of abbesses ==
- 1252–1312: Sybille de Boisgency
- 1312–1339: Jeanne I Bizien
- 1339–1349: Jeanne II Amaury
- 1349–1363: Amicie de Kergroades
- 1363–1370: Jeanne III de Pestivien
- 1370–1390: Jeanne IV de Châteaugal
- 1390–1416: Adelice I Le Barbu
- 1416–1446: Marguerite I Le Barbu
- 1446–1450: Marguerite II Gouyon
- 1450–1452: Adelice II de Couventizian
- 1452–1469: Jeanne V de Coëtivy
- 1469–1470: Isabelle de Bellouan
- 1470–1490ː Annette de Kergroezès
- 1490–1512ː Guillemette de Rigallen
- 1512–1546: Marie I Omnès
- 1546–1562: Françoise I Omnès
- 1562–1590: Catherine I de Carné
- 1590–1595: Françoise II de Kermorvan
- 1595–1605: Catherine II Geoffroy
- 1605–1631: Thomasse de Châteauneuf de Rieux
- 1631–1646: Louise Robert
- 1646–1688: Madeleine I Le Cogneux
- 1688–1705: Suzanne de Plœuc du Timeur
- 1705–1719: Jeanne VI Rogère de Blanchefort
- 1719–1731: Antoinette-Jeanne du Fay d’Athyes de Cilly
- 1731–1739: Marie II Guillemette de Langle
- 1739–1756: Thérèse du Boetiez de Kerorguen
- 1756–1766: Marie III Anne de Bertin de Saint-Géran
- 1766–1776: Marie IV Perrine de Verdière
- 1776–1792: Madeline II Clotilde de La Bourdonnaye de Blossac

== Bibliography ==
- de Sainte Marie, Tanneguy (2012). "Abbayes, couvents et monastères devenus dépôts d'étalons impériaux, royaux et nationaux". In Situ (18). doi:10.4000/insitu.9646. ISSN 1630-7305.

== See also ==
- Abbey of Notre-Dame de Langonnet
- L'Aumône Abbey
- Saint-Antoine-des-Champs
