= L'Aumône Abbey =

Abbey in Loir-et-Cher, France

Coordinates: 47.8738°N 1.3784°E

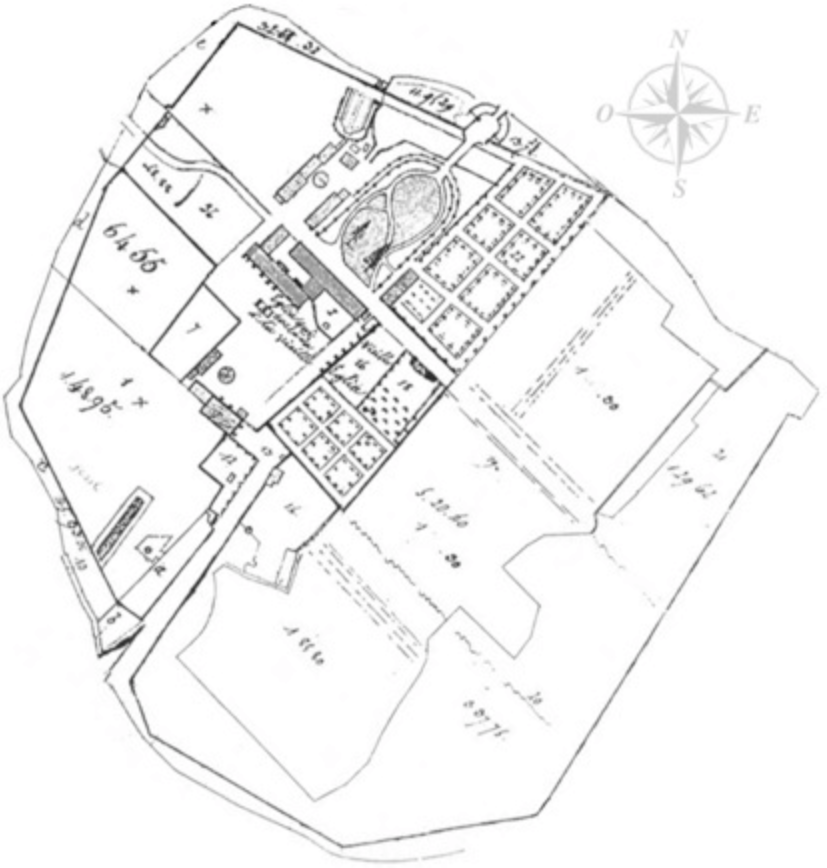
Cadastral plan of the abbey site, 1818

L’Aumône Abbey (French: Abbaye Notre-Dame de l’Aumône, Latin: Eleemosynae; also known as French: Petit-Cîteaux, Latin: Cistercium minus) is a former Cistercian monastery in the commune of La Colombe, Loir-et-Cher, France, 34 kilometres north of Blois in the Forêt de Cîteaux, part of the Forêt de Marchenoir.

== History ==
The abbey was founded in 1121, thanks to a gift from Count Theobald IV of Blois, as the seventh daughter house of Cîteaux Abbey. It became the mother house of 29 abbeys, including Waverley Abbey in England (the first Cistercian foundation in the British Isles), Bégard Abbey, Tintern Abbey, Langonnet Abbey and Le Landais Abbey.

The abbey suffered greatly during the Hundred Years' War and by 1396 lay mostly in ruins. The subsequent reconstruction and the introduction of commendatory abbots proved a serious burden.

The abbey was suppressed in 1791 during the French Revolution. The land was sold in 1818 and the debris from the ruins was used as building material.

== Buildings ==
Of the mediaeval structures there survive a 13th-century dovecote, two 15th-century buildings and a piece of the church wall. Some fragments of the cloister are in the museum in Blois.

== See also ==
- Abbey La Joie Notre-Dame

== Sources ==
- Bernard Peugniez, 2001: Routier cistercien. Abbayes et sites. France, Belgique, Luxembourg, Suisse (new enlarged edition), p. 108 . Moisenay: Éditions Gaud. ISBN 2-84080-044-6
