= Maurice of Carnoet =

French Roman Catholic saint

Saint Maurice of Carnoet
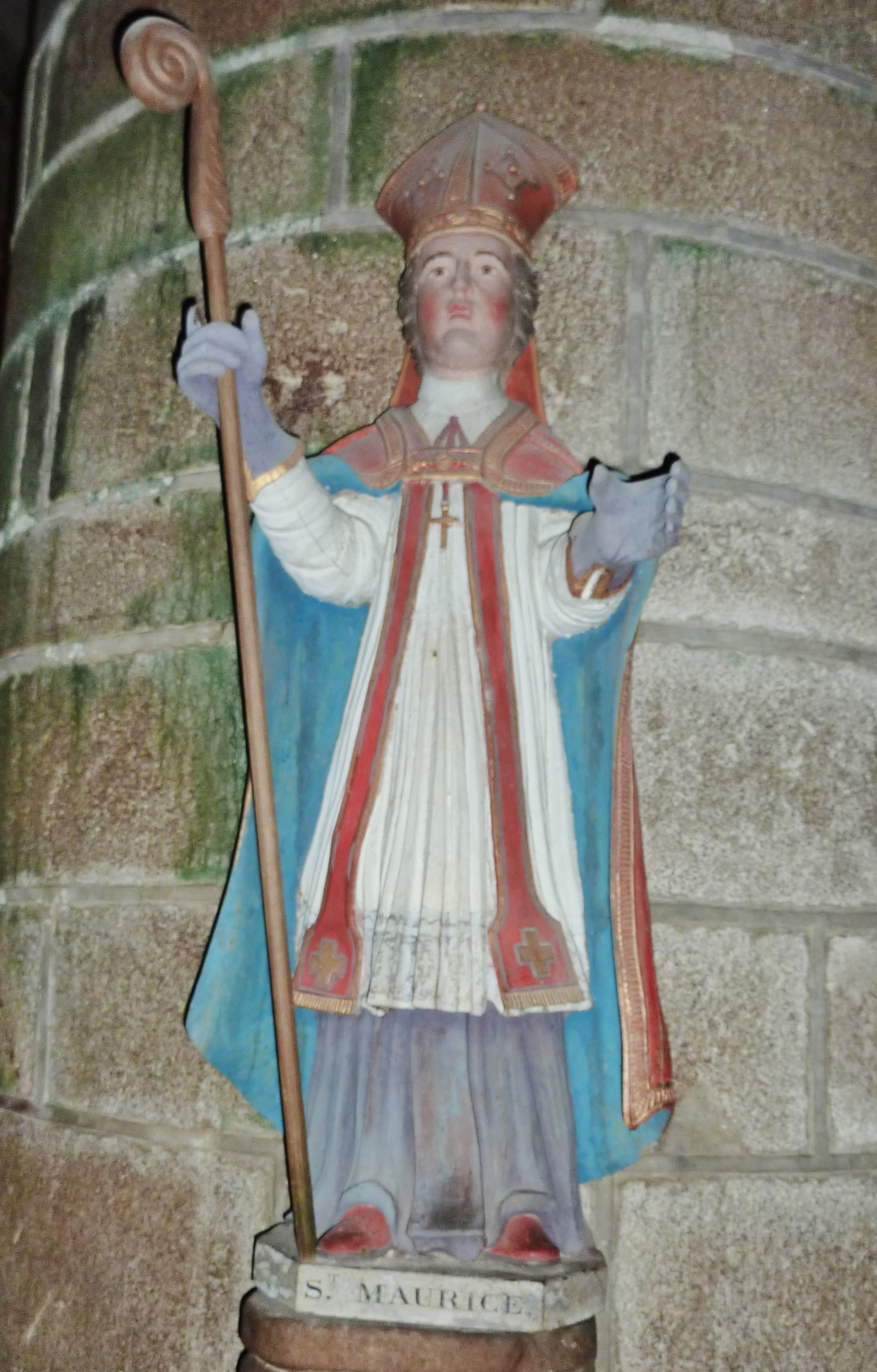
- Statue of Saint Maurice in the Church of Saint-Ronan, Locronan Parish close
- Born: 1117; Kerbarth, Croixanvec, France
- Died: 1191
- Venerated in: Roman Catholic Church
- Feast: 13 October

Maurice of Carnoet was a Cistercian abbot. Born in Brittany, Maurice went on to study at the University of Paris. When he completed his studies he entered the Langonette Monastery in 1144. In 1176 he was elected abbot of Langonette Monastery. Later Duke Conan IV of Brittany build the Carnoet Abbey, for Maurice. In 1176 he became the monastery's first abbot.
