= Saint-Nicolas-lès-Cîteaux =

- Commune
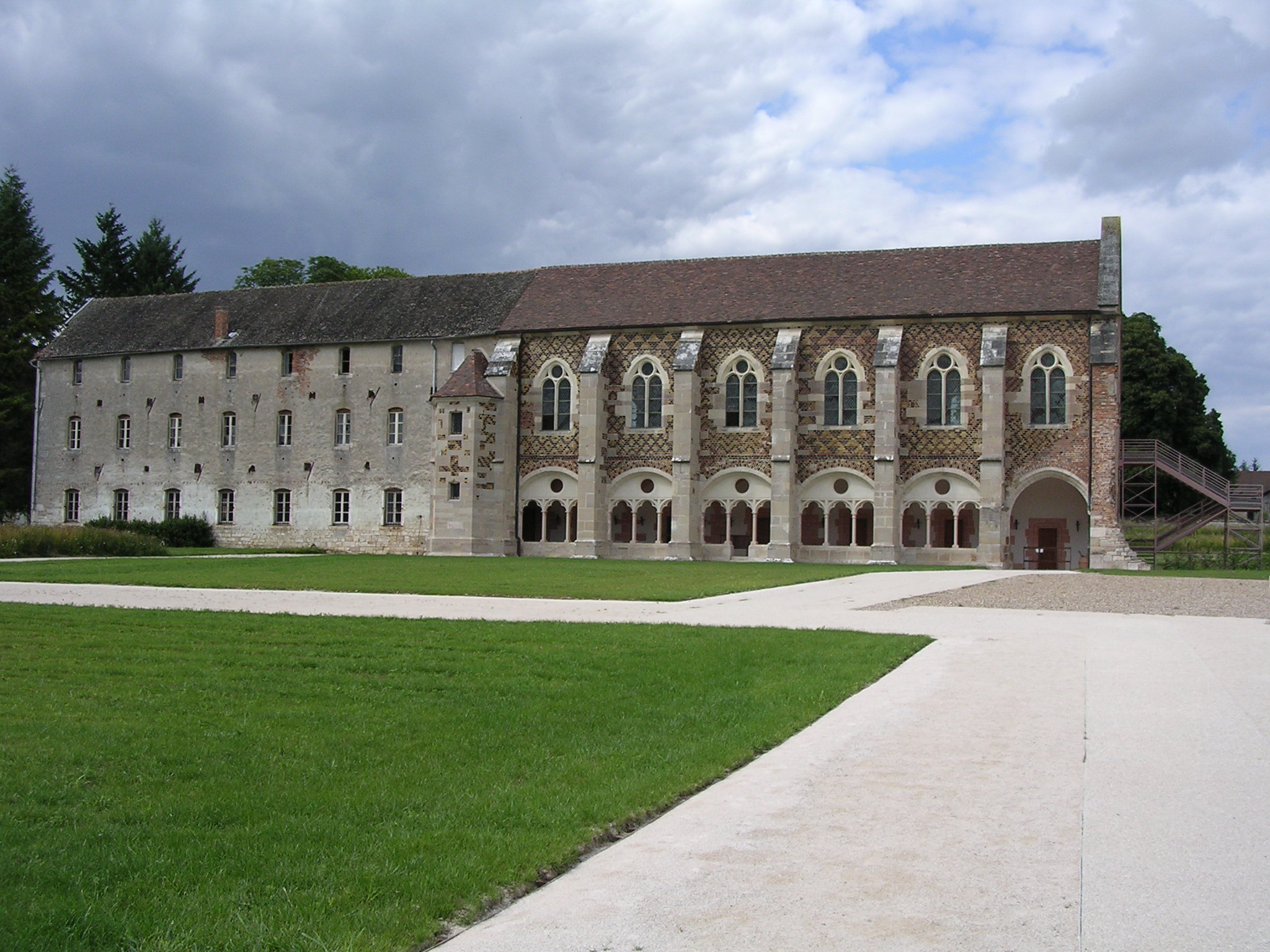
- Cîteaux Abbey

- Coat of arms
- Location of Saint-Nicolas-lès-Cîteaux
- Location within France Location within Bourgogne-Franche-Comté
- Coordinates: 47°06′56″N 5°03′19″E
- Country: France
- Region: Bourgogne-Franche-Comté
- Department: Côte-d'Or
- Arrondissement: Beaune
- Canton: Nuits-Saint-Georges

Government
  - Mayor (2020–2026): Florence Zito
- Area^{1}: 28.93 km^{2} (11.17 sq mi)
- Elevation: 200 m (660 ft)
- Highest elevation: 227 m (745 ft)
- Lowest elevation: 190 m (620 ft)
- Population (2023): 385
  - Density: 13.3/km^{2} (34.5/sq mi)
- Time zone: UTC+01:00 (CET)
  - Summer (DST): UTC+02:00 (CEST)
- INSEE/Postal code: 21564 /21700
- ^{1} French Land Register data, which excludes lakes, ponds, glaciers > 1 km^{2} (0.386 sq mi or 247 acres) and river estuaries.

Saint-Nicolas-lès-Cîteaux (French pronunciation: [sɛ̃ nikɔla lɛ sito]) is a commune in the Côte-d'Or department in eastern France.

Cîteaux Abbey is located in the commune.

== Geography ==
=== Climate ===
Saint-Nicolas-lès-Cîteaux has an oceanic climate (Köppen climate classification Cfb). The average annual temperature in Saint-Nicolas-lès-Cîteaux is 10.9 °C (51.6 °F). The average annual rainfall is 836.7 mm (32.94 in) with May as the wettest month. The temperatures are highest on average in July, at around 19.8 °C (67.6 °F), and lowest in January, at around 2.3 °C (36.1 °F). The highest temperature ever recorded in Saint-Nicolas-lès-Cîteaux was 40.0 °C (104.0 °F) on 12 August 2003; the coldest temperature ever recorded was −23.0 °C (−9.4 °F) on 9 January 1985.

Climate data for Saint-Nicolas-lès-Cîteaux (1991–2020 normals, extremes 1953−present)
Month	Jan	Feb	Mar	Apr	May	Jun	Jul	Aug	Sep	Oct	Nov	Dec	Year
Record high °C (°F)	16.9 (62.4)	20.1 (68.2)	24.0 (75.2)	29.4 (84.9)	32.4 (90.3)	36.6 (97.9)	38.6 (101.5)	40.0 (104.0)	34.8 (94.6)	28.0 (82.4)	21.0 (69.8)	17.0 (62.6)	40.0 (104.0)
Mean daily maximum °C (°F)	5.9 (42.6)	8.0 (46.4)	13.0 (55.4)	16.3 (61.3)	20.7 (69.3)	24.4 (75.9)	26.8 (80.2)	26.6 (79.9)	21.6 (70.9)	16.3 (61.3)	9.8 (49.6)	6.2 (43.2)	16.3 (61.3)
Daily mean °C (°F)	2.8 (37.0)	3.9 (39.0)	7.6 (45.7)	10.2 (50.4)	14.6 (58.3)	18.0 (64.4)	20.1 (68.2)	19.9 (67.8)	15.8 (60.4)	11.7 (53.1)	6.2 (43.2)	3.4 (38.1)	11.2 (52.1)
Mean daily minimum °C (°F)	−0.3 (31.5)	−0.2 (31.6)	2.2 (36.0)	4.2 (39.6)	8.5 (47.3)	11.6 (52.9)	13.4 (56.1)	13.2 (55.8)	10.0 (50.0)	7.1 (44.8)	2.6 (36.7)	0.5 (32.9)	6.1 (42.9)
Record low °C (°F)	−23.0 (−9.4)	−19.0 (−2.2)	−12.0 (10.4)	−6.0 (21.2)	−3.0 (26.6)	0.8 (33.4)	3.7 (38.7)	2.5 (36.5)	−2.0 (28.4)	−6.0 (21.2)	−10.1 (13.8)	−15.0 (5.0)	−23.0 (−9.4)
Average precipitation mm (inches)	58.3 (2.30)	49.5 (1.95)	53.7 (2.11)	61.9 (2.44)	80.2 (3.16)	66.6 (2.62)	72.4 (2.85)	69.4 (2.73)	65.0 (2.56)	83.4 (3.28)	86.3 (3.40)	67.1 (2.64)	813.8 (32.04)
Average precipitation days (≥ 1.0 mm)	11.3	9.5	9.5	9.7	10.9	8.5	8.4	8.5	8.0	10.6	11.7	11.8	118.4
Source: Meteociel

== Population ==
Historical population
Year	Pop.	±% p.a.
1968	386	—
1975	316	−2.82%
1982	331	+0.66%
1990	400	+2.40%
1999	475	+1.93%
2007	463	−0.32%
2012	415	−2.17%
2017	427	+0.57%
2023	385	−1.71%
Source: INSEE

== Town partnerships ==
Saint-Nicolas-lès-Cîteaux fosters partnerships with the following places:

- Roth, Rhineland-Palatinate, Germany since 1 June 1991

== See also ==
- Communes of the Côte-d'Or department
