= Cîteaux Abbey =

Abbey in Côte-d'Or, France

Coordinates: 47°07′41″N 5°05′36″E

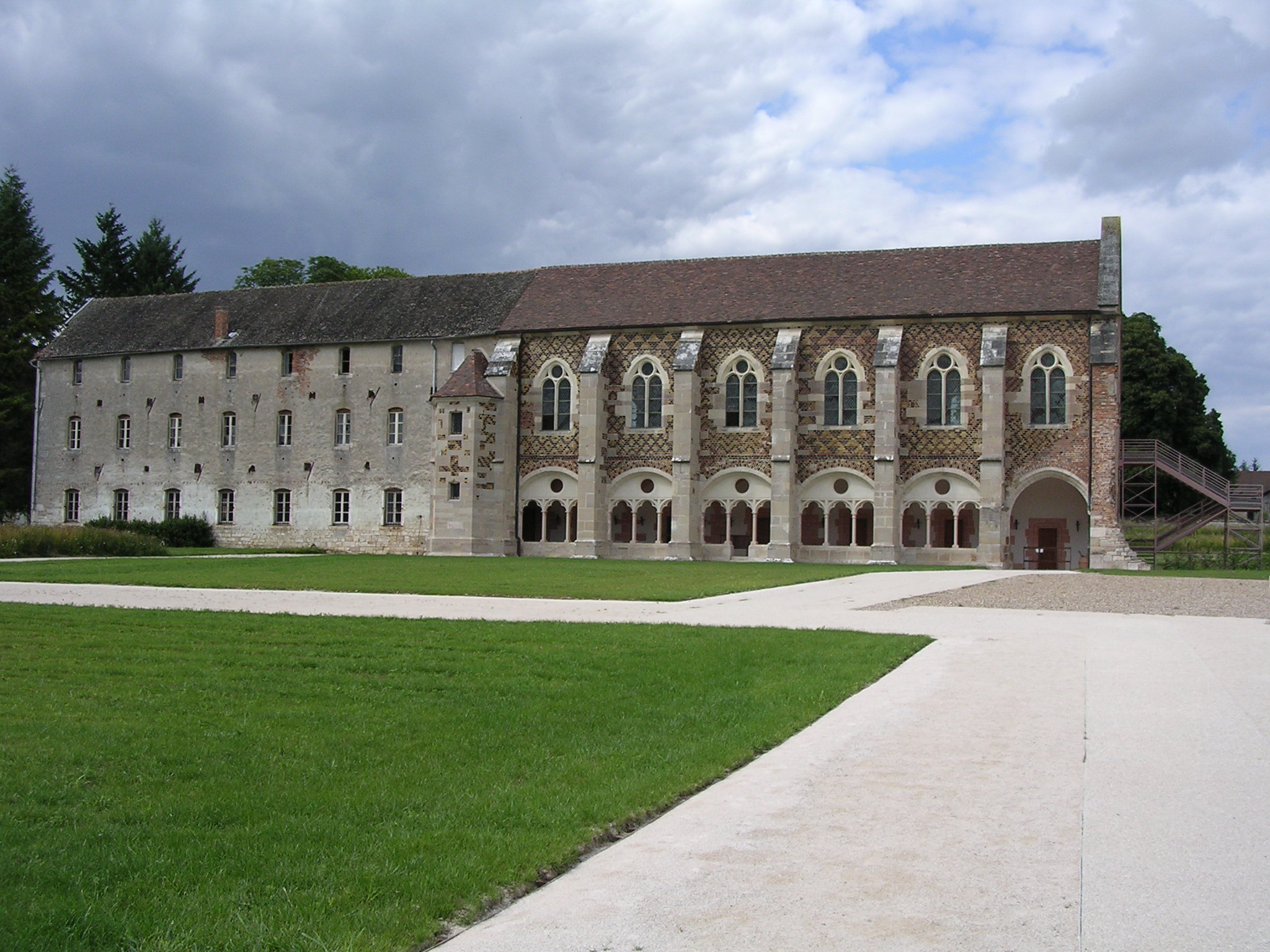
Cîteaux Abbey

Cîteaux Abbey (French: Abbaye de Cîteaux [abe.i d(ə) sito]) is a Catholic abbey located in Saint-Nicolas-lès-Cîteaux, south of Dijon, France. It is notable for being the original house of the Order of Cistercians. Today, it belongs to the Trappists (also called the Cistercians of the Strict Observance).

The abbey has about 35 monks. The community produces a cheese branded under the abbey's name, as well as caramels and honey-based candies.

== History ==
Cîteaux Abbey was founded on Saint Benedict's Day, 21 March 1098, by a group of monks from Molesme Abbey seeking to follow more closely the Rule of St. Benedict. The Abbey was supported by Renaud, Vicomte de Beaune, and Odo I, Duke of Burgundy. They were led by Saint Robert of Molesme, who became the first abbot. The site was wooded and swampy, in a sparsely populated area. The toponym predates the abbey, but its origin is uncertain. Theories include a derivation from cis tertium [lapidem miliarium], "this side of the third (milestone)" of the Roman road connecting Langres and Chalons sur Saône, or alternatively from cisternae "cisterns", which in Middle Latin could refer to stagnant pools of a swamp.

In the year 1111, the monastery produced the illuminated manuscript now known as the Cîteaux Moralia in Job.

The second abbot was Saint Alberic, and the third abbot Saint Stephen Harding, who wrote the Carta Caritatis that described the organisation of the order. Saint Bernard of Clairvaux, who would later be proclaimed Doctor of the Church, was a monk of Cîteaux Abbey and was sent in 1115 to found Clairvaux Abbey, of which he became the first abbot. Saint Bernard was influential in the exponential growth of the Cistercian Order that followed.

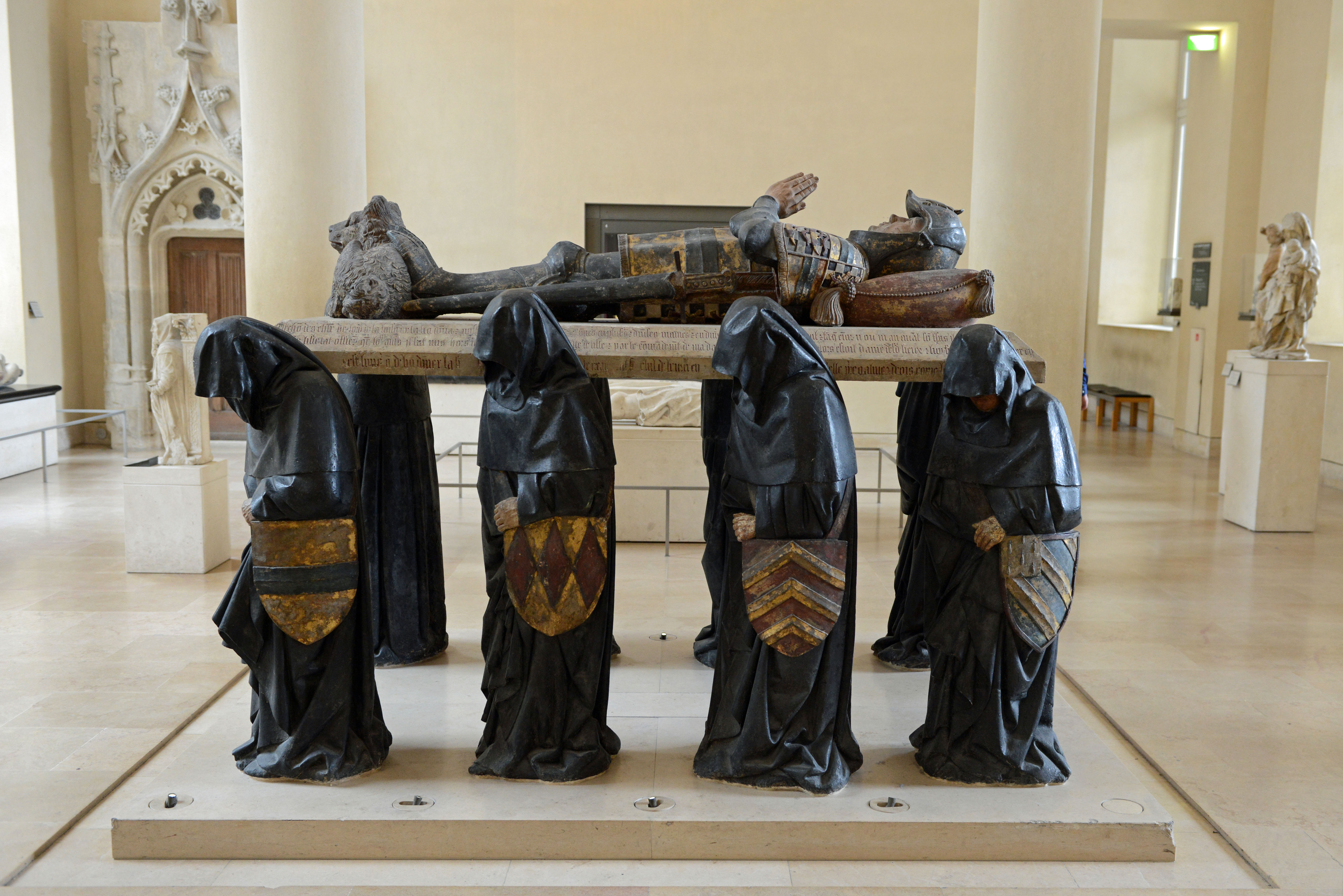
Cistercian monks depicted on the tomb of Philippe Pot

The great church of Cîteaux Abbey, begun in around 1140, was completed in 1193. The Dukes of Burgundy subsequently used it as their dynastic place of burial. Other dignitaries were buried inside chapels, perhaps most famously the magnificent tomb of Philippe Pot, a high Burgundian official who died in 1493.

By the beginning of the 13th century the order had more than 500 houses and Cîteaux became an important center of Christianity. In 1244, King Louis IX of France (Saint Louis) and his mother Blanche of Castile visited the abbey.

During the Hundred Years' War, the monastery was pillaged in 1360 (the monks sought refuge in Dijon), in 1365, 1434 and 1438. In 1380, the Earl of Buckingham stayed at L'Aumône Abbey, a daughter house of Cîteaux located in the forest of Marchenoir whilst his army was quartered in the surrounding Forest.

=== The modern era ===
Since Cîteaux, the head of the order, had to meet extraordinary demands above and beyond those of other Cistercian abbeys, its campus was different. There had to be accommodations for the delegates of the annual chapter, their entourages and horses, but also for the ducal family. These obligations had an impact on the development of the abbey's infrastructure.

To the north, the abbey's gatehouse opened onto a first courtyard, the so-called "lower courtyard", which was flanked by large buildings for guests and pilgrims. At its southern end there was a second gate, the upper floor of which was reserved for the accommodation of the Duchesses of Burgundy. It opened onto a large courtyard of honor, which in turn led to the residence of the Dukes of Burgundy. This courtyard also included buildings that were only used during the General Chapter.

In the beginning of the 16th century, the abbey had a strong community of about 200 members. However, it suffered badly in the French Wars of Religion and slowly declined for the next century. in 1589, soldiers stormed and looted the abbey, reportedly carrying away "three hundred wagonloads of booty" and leaving the monastery in ruins. Cîteaux was left "practically abandoned for years", and it took until around 1610 for any sort of stable monastic life to be re-established there.

In 1698, the abbey had 72 professed monks. In 1790, in the wake of the French Revolution, the monks were offered a pension if they agreed to return to civilian life. Fourteen of them, including Abbot Francois Trouvé, refused the offer, while twenty-nine took it. The abbey was seized and the property sold off by the government; what was left was looted by the local population. To calm the ensuing violence, a minor squad under the direction of Napoléon Bonaparte was called in.

=== Penitentiary colony ===
The Cîteaux Abbey see the establishment in 1846 of the agricultural penitentiary colony led by Father Joseph Rey. The colony was intended to detain minors and teach them a trade. The educational methods were similar to military methods, and from 1883, reports revealed poor hygiene, nutrition, and teaching conditions, and the Ministry of the Interior no longer sent prisoners to this colony. They would henceforth be entrusted to public colonies. The scandal of 1888, brought up before the National Assembly, led to the withdrawal of recognition of public utility from the Society of the Brothers of St Joseph. This lasted until 1895. The Cîteaux estate then passed into state hands. Cîteaux became a monastery again in 1898, when the Trappist monks settled there.

=== The rebirth of the Abbey ===
Trappist monks resumed monastic life at the abbey in 1898, and they continue to reside there. The first monks, four in number, arrived from Sept-Fons on 2 October 1898. In 1913, the abbey had around twenty-five people, monks and lay brothers, and was facing financial difficulties. The commercial production of cheese began around this time. In 1998, the celebration of the 9th centenary of the founding of Cîteaux was marked by the renovation of the church.

=== Restoration work ===
The abbey has preserved three buildings from the ancient period. The oldest, the library, completed in 1509, with a ribbed vault. The "Définitoire", with a groin vault, which includes several rooms including a large one with central columns, and the dormitory on the upper floor and finally the last building, called the Lenoir building, completed in 1771. These three buildings were classified as historic monuments by decree of 28 December 1978. Between 1824 and 1839, transformations were carried out to adapt the building to the needs of a sugar mill.

A rehabilitation and restoration project, supported by the Congrégation de Cîteaux and the international association Cîteaux Mater Nostra, was initiated on the basis of a programming study carried out in 2019 by the Archipat agency.

=== Notable abbots ===
- Robert of Molesme (21 March 1098 – 6 July 1099)
- Alberic (July 1099 – 26 January 1108)
- Stephen Harding (1108 – September 1133)
- Raynaud de Bar (1134 – 16 December 1150)
- Gilbert le Grand (May 1163 – 17 October 1168)
- Guy II de Paray (April/May 1194 – 1200)
- Arnaud Amaury (September 1200 – 12 March 1212)
- Conrad of Urach (3 April 1217 – 8 January 1218)
- Guy III de Bourgogne (1257/1258 – May 1262)
- Robert II de Pontigny (January 1294 – 30 November 1299)
- Jérôme de la Souchère (1/2 July 1564 – 23 October 1571)
- Nicolas I Boucherat (12 December 1571 – December 1583)
- Cardinal Richelieu (19 November 1635 – 4 December 1642)
- Claude Vaussin (2 January 1643 – 1 February 1670)

== Film set ==
In 2018, a team from the TV programme Secrets d'Histoire filmed several sequences at the abbey as part of an episode devoted to Blanche of Castile, entitled Blanche of Castile, the Queen Mother has character..., broadcast on 5 July 2018 on France 2 channel.

== Sources ==
- Plouvier, M. and Saint-Denis, A. (eds.), 1998: Pour une histoire monumentale de Cîteaux, 1098-1998 (Commentarii cistercienses. Studia et documenta, 8), Cîteaux.
