= Plouray =

Plouray Plourae
- Commune
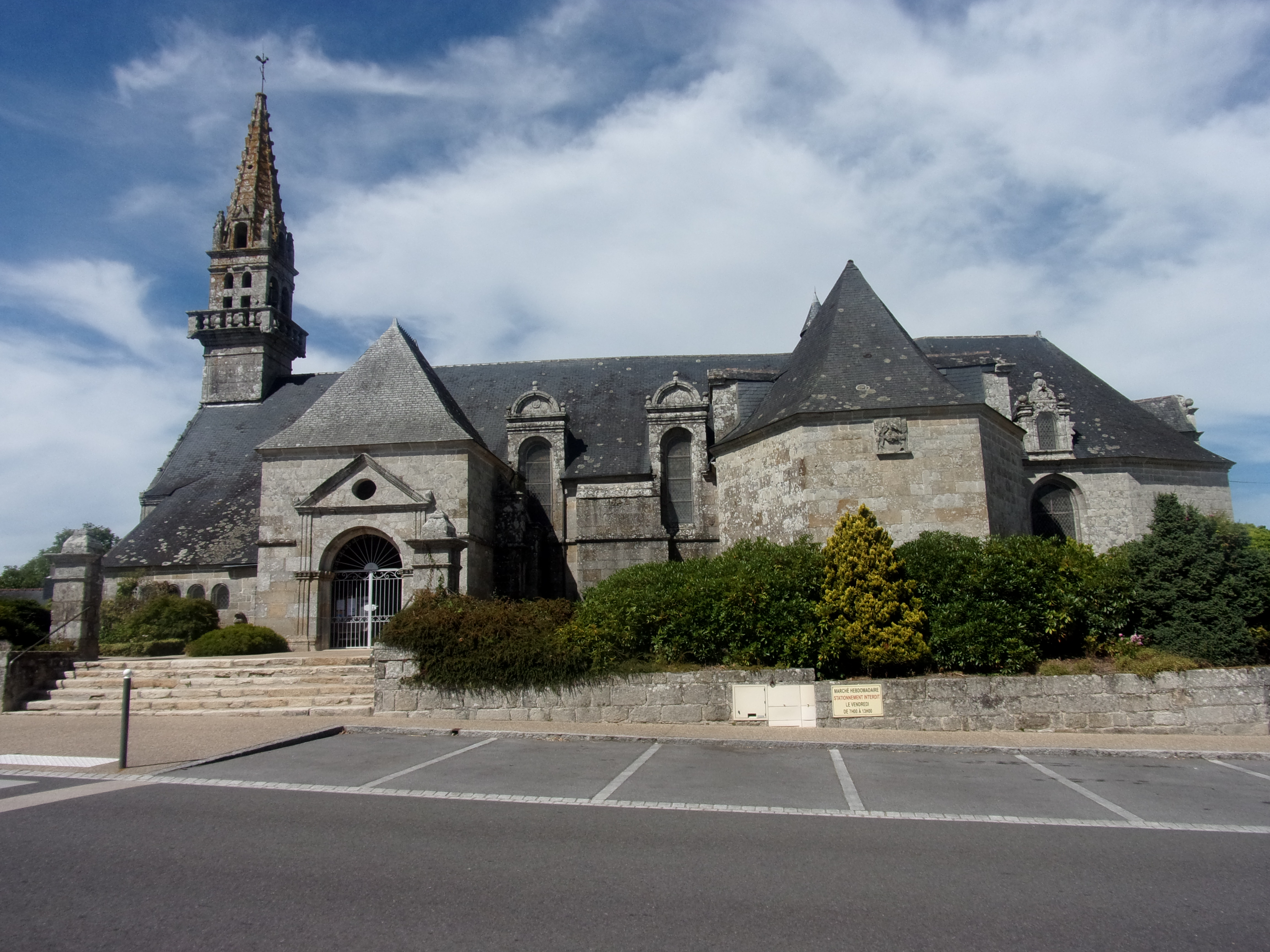
- The church of Saint-Yves, in Plouray

- Coat of arms
- Location of Plouray
- Location within France Location within Brittany
- Coordinates: 48°08′47″N 3°23′12″W
- Country: France
- Region: Brittany
- Department: Morbihan
- Arrondissement: Pontivy
- Canton: Gourin
- Intercommunality: Roi Morvan Communauté

Government
  - Mayor (2026–32): Michel Morvant
- Area^{1}: 39.09 km^{2} (15.09 sq mi)
- Highest elevation: 296 m (971 ft)
- Lowest elevation: 170 m (560 ft)
- Population (2023): 1,060
  - Density: 27.1/km^{2} (70.2/sq mi)
- Time zone: UTC+01:00 (CET)
  - Summer (DST): UTC+02:00 (CEST)
- INSEE/Postal code: 56170 /56770
- ^{1} French Land Register data, which excludes lakes, ponds, glaciers > 1 km^{2} (0.386 sq mi or 247 acres) and river estuaries.

Plouray (French pronunciation: [pluʁɛ]; Breton: Plourae) is a commune in the Morbihan department of Brittany in north-western France. Inhabitants of Plouray are called in French Plouraysiens.

== Population ==
Plouray's population peaked at 1,991 in 1936 and declined to 1,060 in 2023. This represents a 47% decrease in total population since the peak census figure.

Historical population

Year	Pop.	±% p.a.
1793	1,480	—
1800	1,328	−1.54%
1806	1,370	+0.52%
1821	1,287	−0.42%
1831	1,453	+1.22%
1836	1,581	+1.70%
1841	1,571	−0.13%
1846	1,639	+0.85%
1851	1,662	+0.28%
1856	1,487	−2.20%
1861	1,470	−0.23%
1866	1,558	+1.17%
1872	1,454	−1.14%
1876	1,547	+1.56%
1881	1,605	+0.74%
1886	1,644	+0.48%
1891	1,603	−0.50%
1896	1,671	+0.83%
1901	1,719	+0.57%

Year	Pop.	±% p.a.
1906	1,853	+1.51%
1911	1,988	+1.42%
1921	1,969	−0.10%
1926	1,967	−0.02%
1931	1,978	+0.11%
1936	1,991	+0.13%
1946	1,890	−0.52%
1954	1,684	−1.43%
1962	1,501	−1.43%
1968	1,406	−1.08%
1975	1,358	−0.49%
1982	1,301	−0.61%
1990	1,200	−1.01%
1999	1,144	−0.53%
2007	1,110	−0.38%
2012	1,117	+0.13%
2017	1,121	+0.07%
2023	1,060	−0.93%

Source: EHESS and INSEE (1968–2023)

== Geography ==
Plouray is located in the northwestern part of Morbihan, 12 km (7.5 mi) southwest of Rostrenen, 40 km (25 mi) northwest of Pontivy and 44 km (27 mi) north of Lorient. Historically, the village belongs to Vannetais. Plouray is border by Glomel and Mellionnec to the north, by Ploërdut to the east, by Saint-Tugdual and Priziac to the south and by Langonnet to the west.

== Map ==
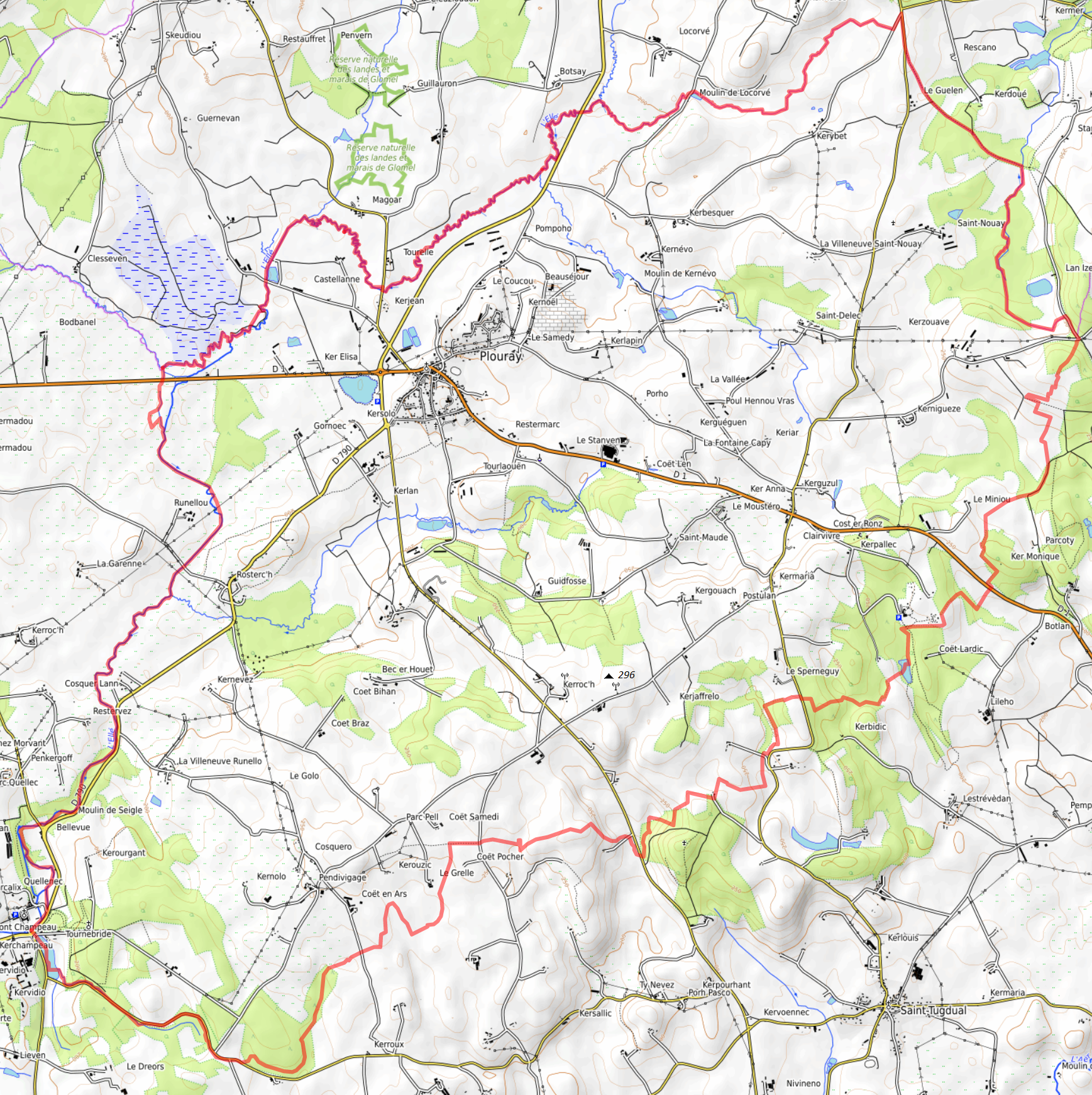
Topographic map

== Environment ==
Planning a base for automotive recycling by the French company GDE, a subsidiary of the industrial group Trafigura, which sent the ship Probo-Koala to Abidjan in 2006 (see 2006 Ivory Coast toxic waste spill). The proposal was defeated and no longer applies, however recent pollution of the rivers has destroyed a mature fish population and is expected to take several years to recover (article in the Telegram July 2017).

== Gallery ==
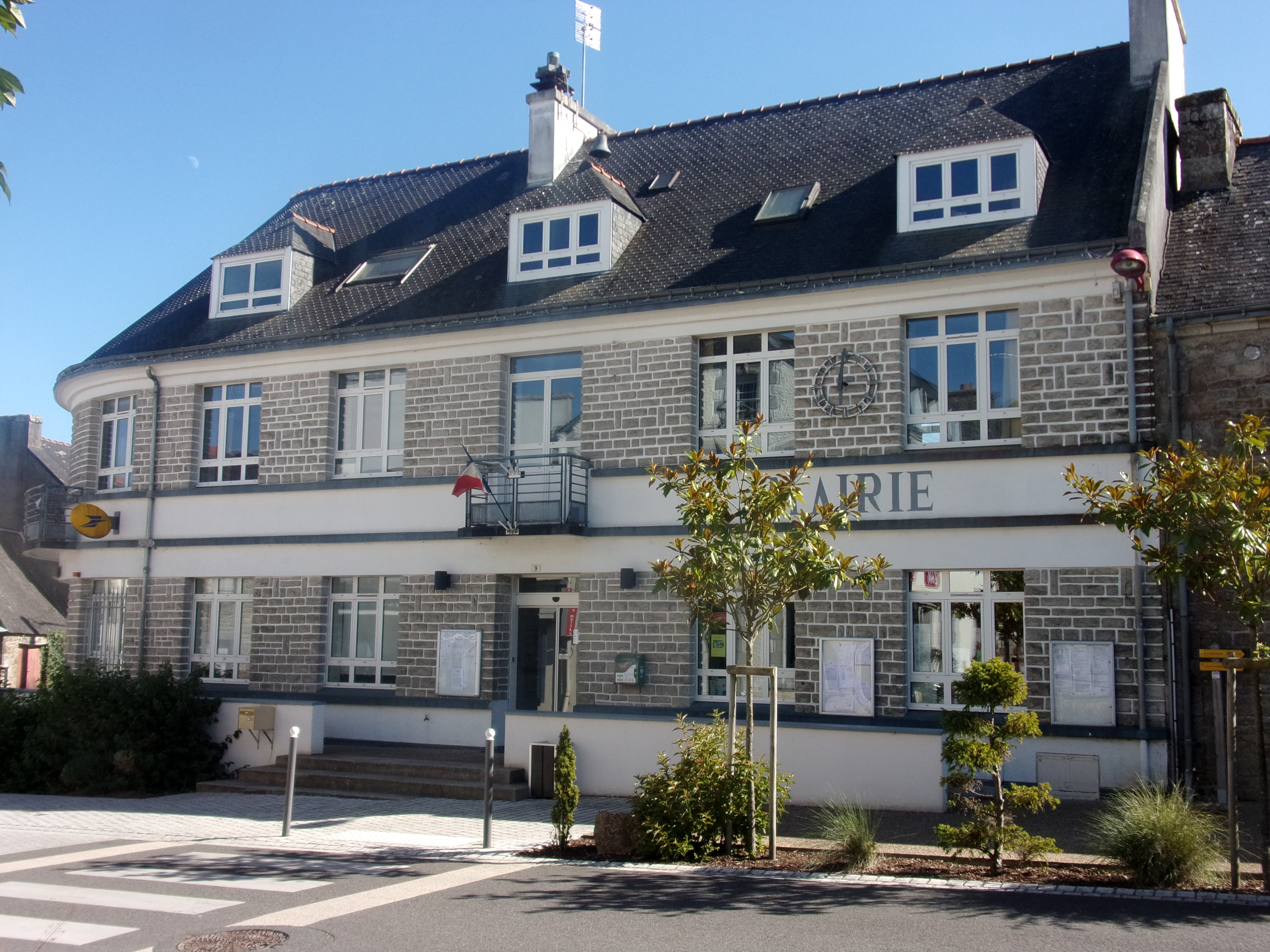
The town hall

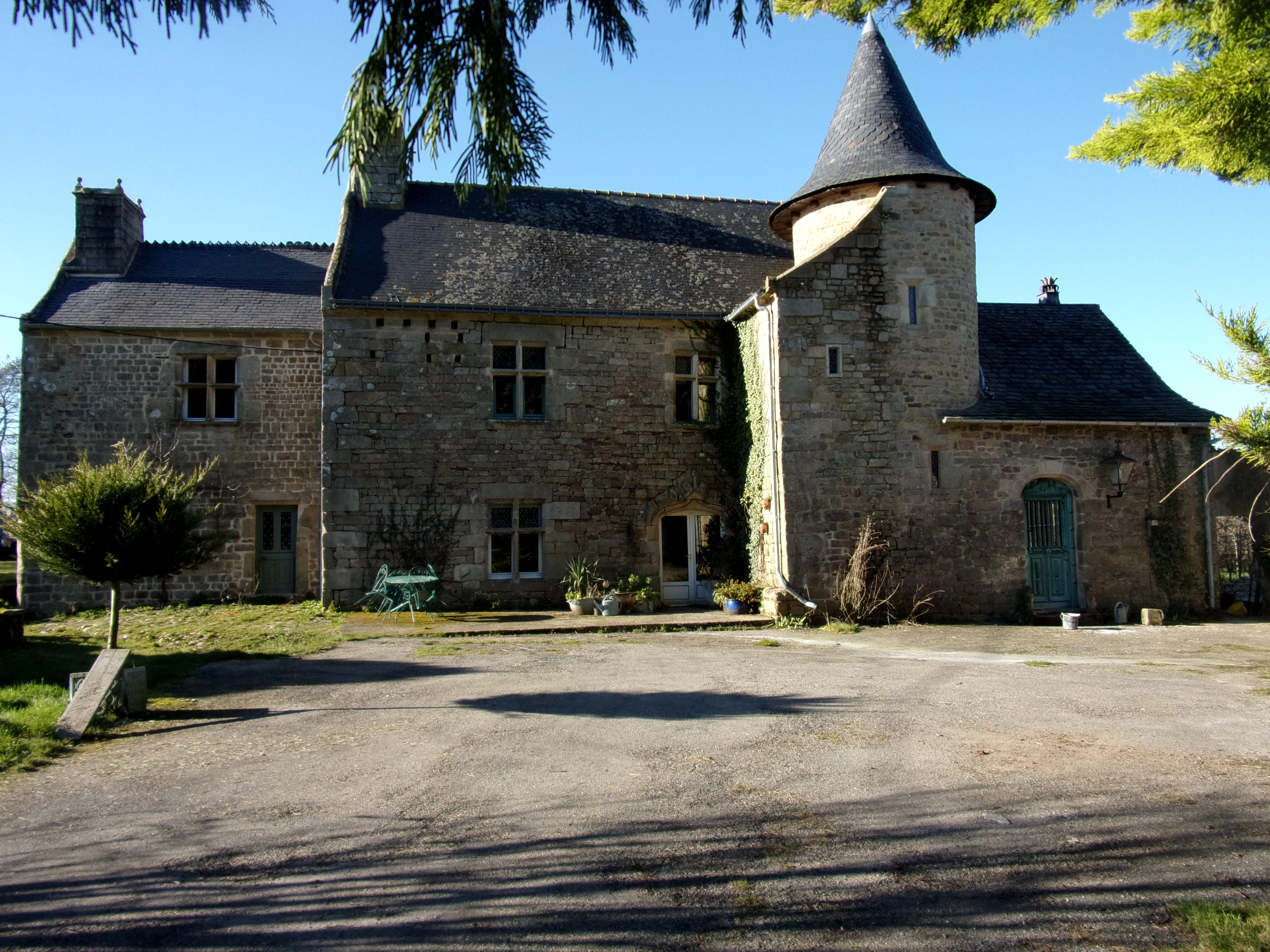
Manor of Penguilly

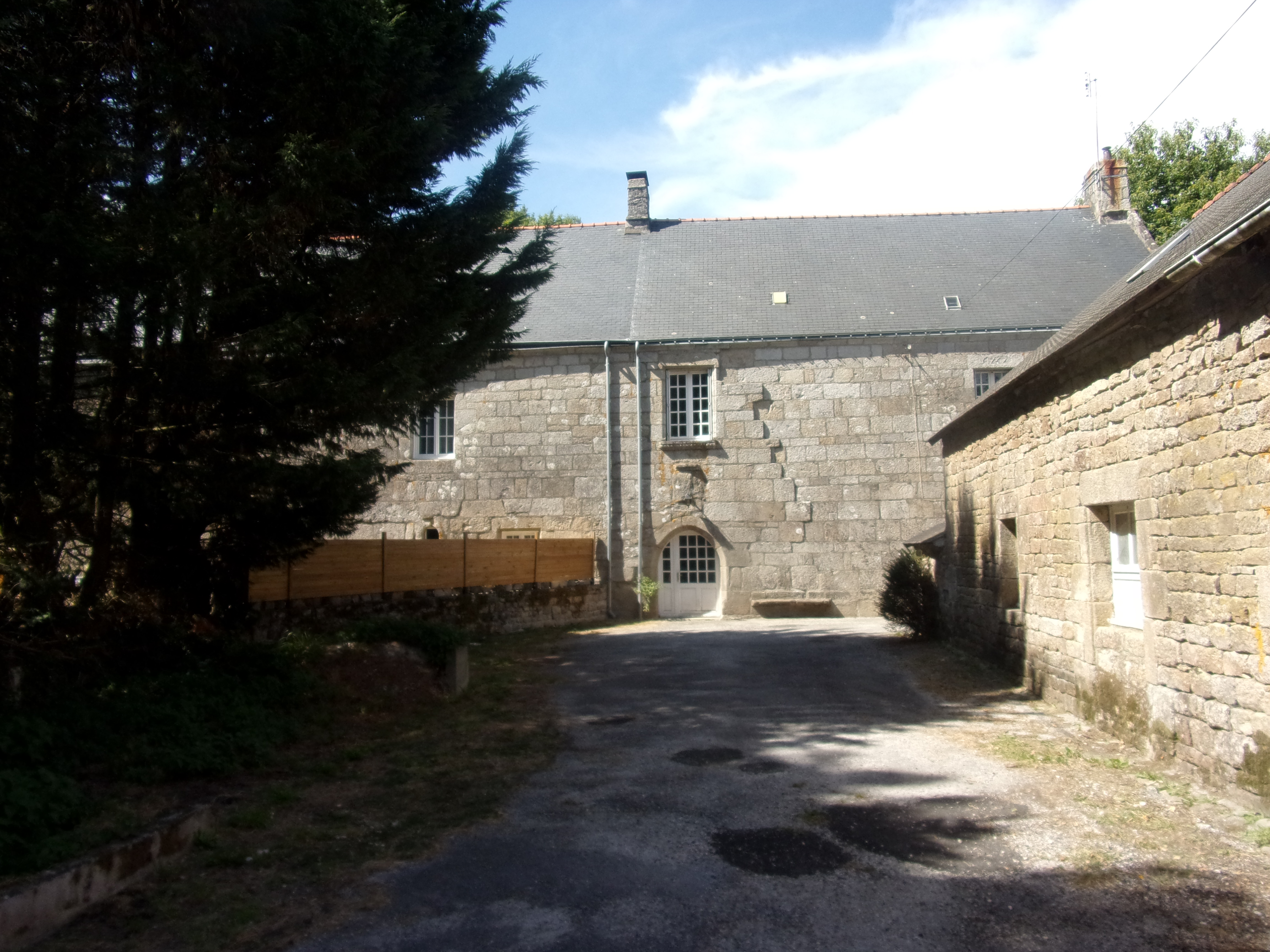
Manor of Restromar

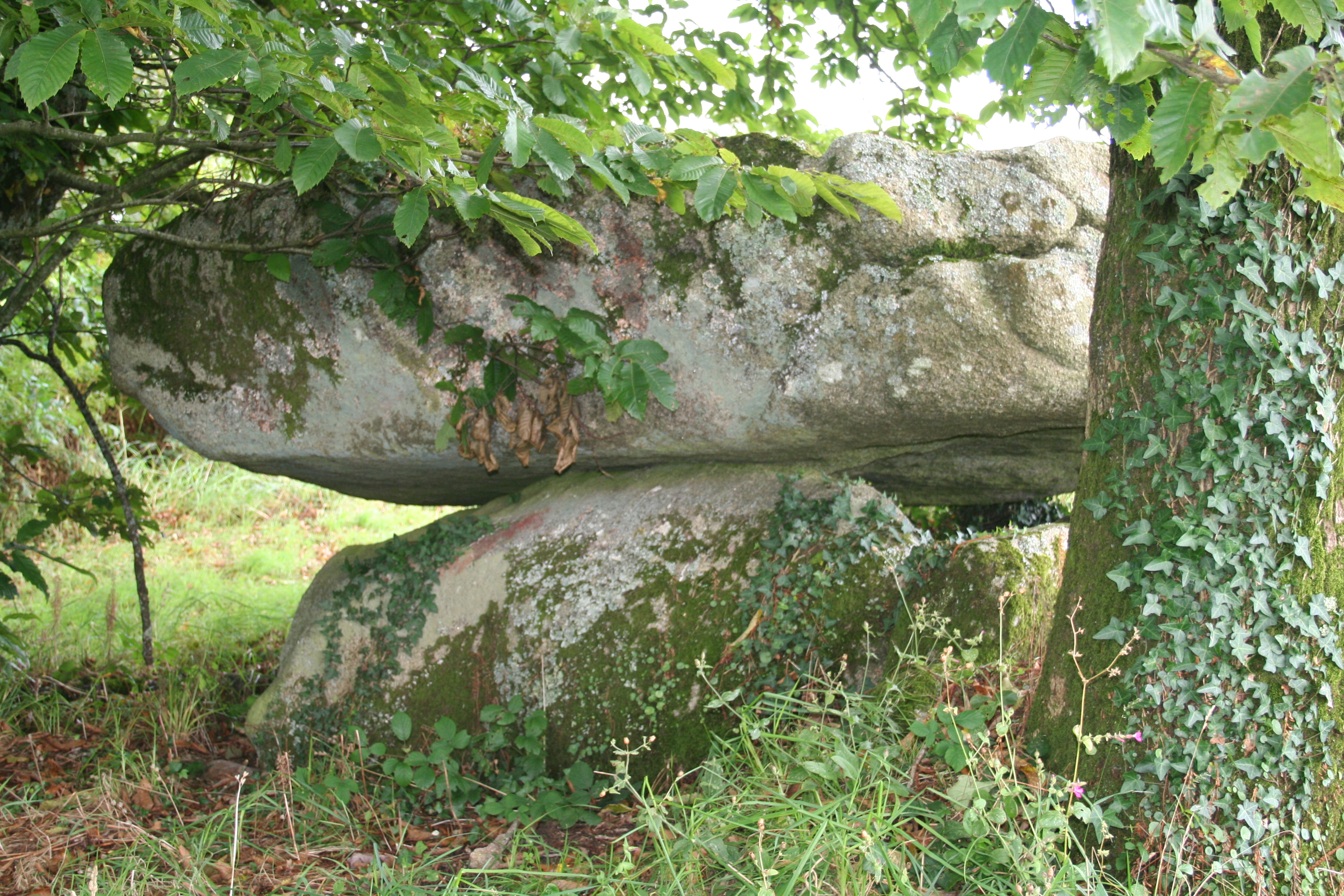
Dolmen of Guidfoss

== See also ==
- Communes of the Morbihan department
