= Le Croisty =

Commune in Brittany, France

Le Croisty Ar C'hroesti
- Commune
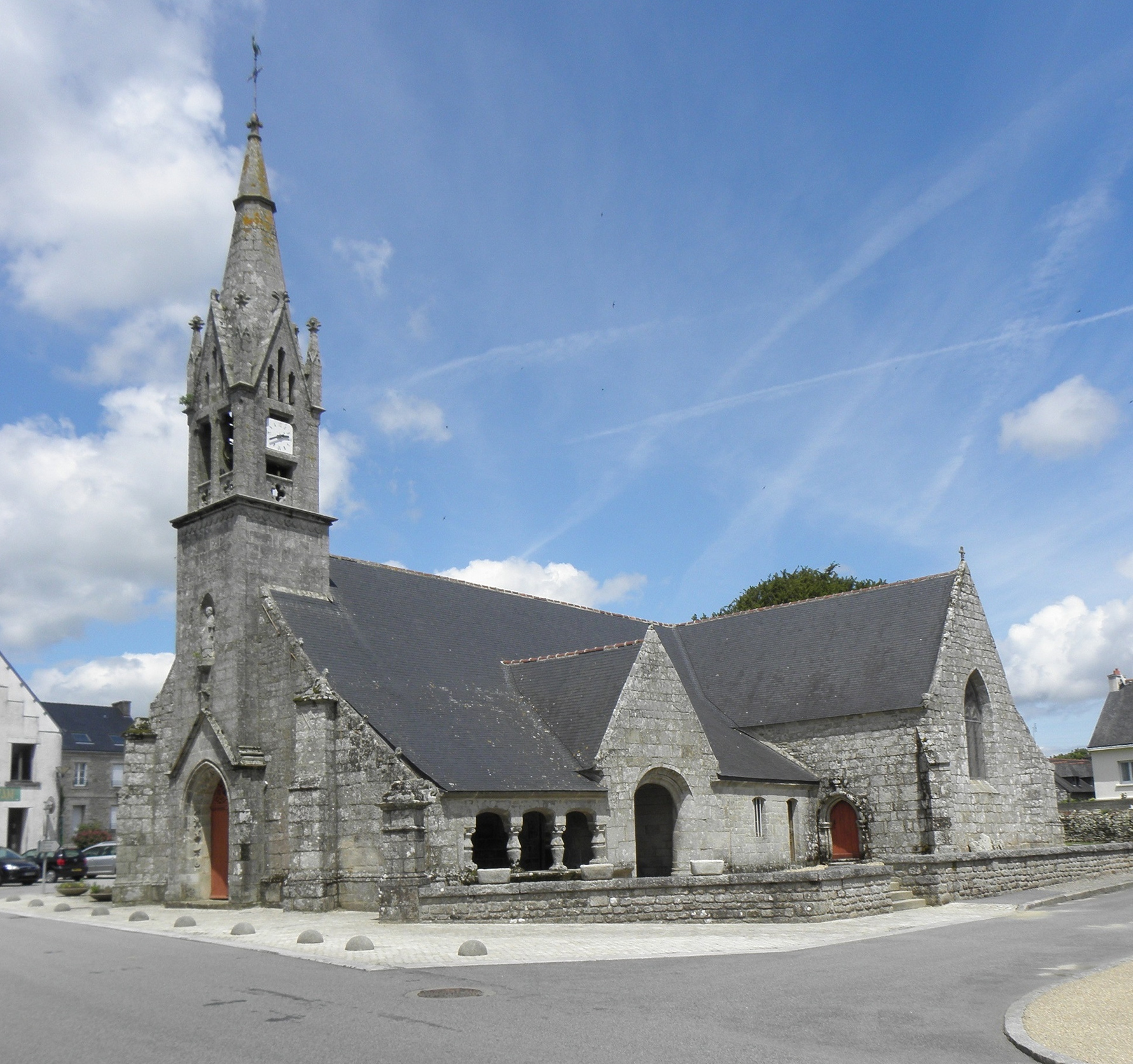
- The parish church in Le Croisty
- Location of Le Croisty
- Location within France Location within Brittany
- Coordinates: 48°03′57″N 3°21′45″W
- Country: France
- Region: Brittany
- Department: Morbihan
- Arrondissement: Pontivy
- Canton: Gourin
- Intercommunality: Roi Morvan Communauté

Government
  - Mayor (2026–32): René Gry
- Area^{1}: 15.88 km^{2} (6.13 sq mi)
- Highest elevation: 255 m (837 ft)
- Lowest elevation: 123 m (404 ft)
- Population (2023): 739
  - Density: 46.5/km^{2} (121/sq mi)
- Time zone: UTC+01:00 (CET)
  - Summer (DST): UTC+02:00 (CEST)
- INSEE/Postal code: 56048 /56540
- ^{1} French Land Register data, which excludes lakes, ponds, glaciers > 1 km^{2} (0.386 sq mi or 247 acres) and river estuaries.

Le Croisty (French pronunciation: [lə kʁwasti]; Breton: Ar C'hroesti) is a commune in the Morbihan department of Brittany in north-western France.

== Toponymy ==
From the breton kroaz which means cross and ty which means house. Le Croisty can be translated as the house of the cross. In the past, the village belonged to the Knights Hospitaller.

== Geography ==
Le Croisty is located 30 km (19 mi) east of Pontivy, 35 km (22 mi) north of Lorient and 64 km (40 mi) northwest of Vannes. Historically, the village belongs to Vannetais and Pays Pourlet. Le Croisty is border by Priziac to the west, by Saint-Tugdual to the north, by Ploërdut to the east and by Saint-Caradec-Trégomel to the south. Apart from the village centre, there are about fifty hamlets. Most of the hamlets consist of two or three houses but others are larger like the village of Cornhospital.

== Map ==
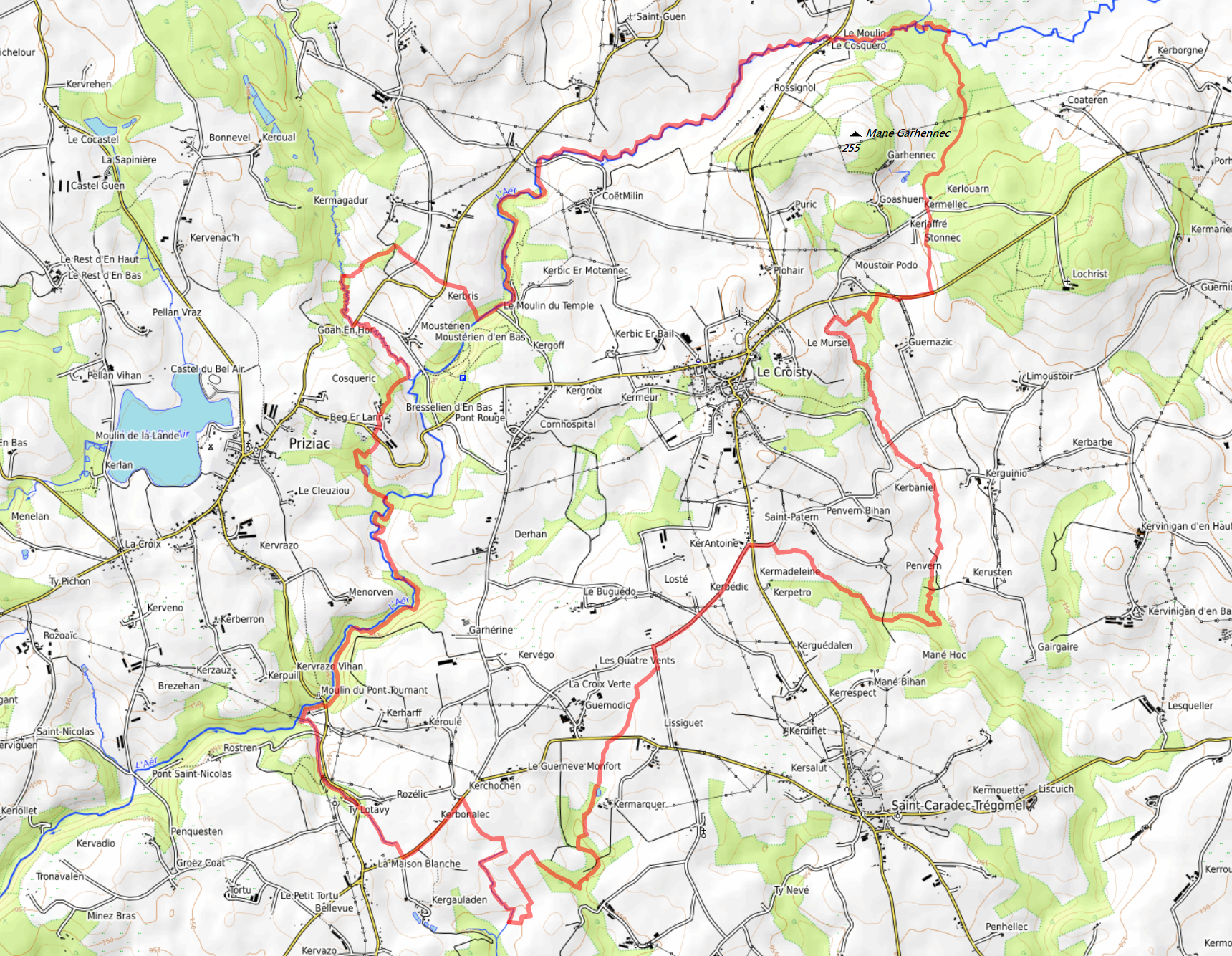
Topographic map

== History ==
Le Croisty was created as a new commune in 1903. Before that, it came within the administrative area of the village of Saint-Tugdual.

== Population ==
Inhabitants of Le Croisty are called in French Croistyates.

Historical population

Year	Pop.	±% p.a.
1906	1,088	—
1911	1,156	+1.22%
1921	1,217	+0.52%
1926	1,315	+1.56%
1931	1,332	+0.26%
1936	1,241	−1.41%
1946	1,232	−0.07%
1954	1,038	−2.12%
1962	1,106	+0.80%

Year	Pop.	±% p.a.
1968	1,113	+0.11%
1975	1,019	−1.25%
1982	921	−1.43%
1990	846	−1.06%
1999	735	−1.55%
2007	689	−0.80%
2012	734	+1.27%
2017	709	−0.69%
2023	739	+0.69%

Source: EHESS and INSEE (1968-2023)

== See also ==
- Communes of the Morbihan department
