= Priziac =

Priziac Prizieg
- Commune
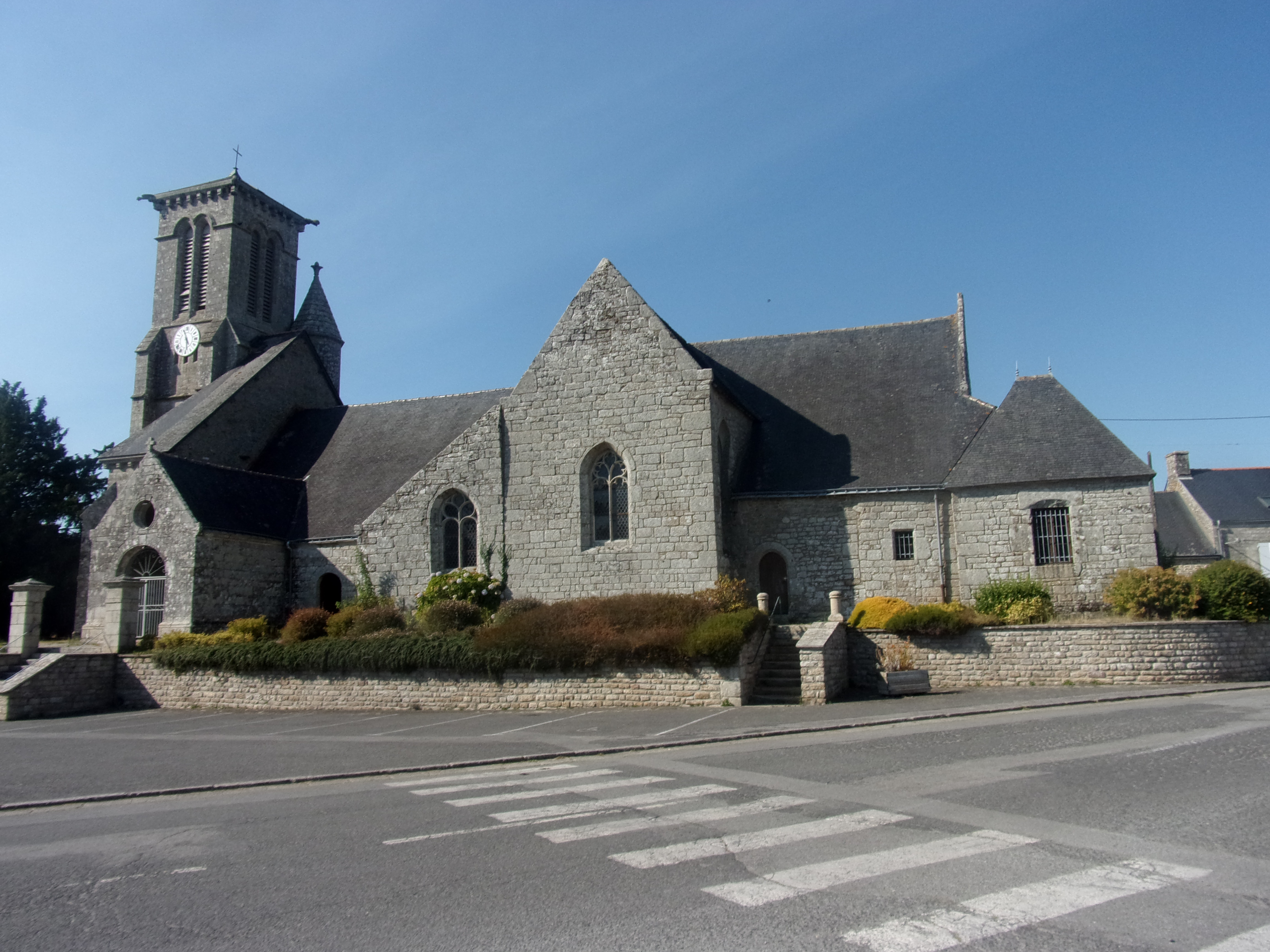
- The Church of Saint-Beheau in Priziac

- Coat of arms
- Location of Priziac
- Location within France Location within Brittany
- Coordinates: 48°03′43″N 3°24′29″W
- Country: France
- Region: Brittany
- Department: Morbihan
- Arrondissement: Pontivy
- Canton: Gourin
- Intercommunality: Roi Morvan Communauté

Government
  - Mayor (2026–32): Caroline Nenez
- Area^{1}: 44.63 km^{2} (17.23 sq mi)
- Highest elevation: 230 m (750 ft)
- Lowest elevation: 56 m (184 ft)
- Population (2023): 1,037
  - Density: 23.24/km^{2} (60.18/sq mi)
- Time zone: UTC+01:00 (CET)
  - Summer (DST): UTC+02:00 (CEST)
- INSEE/Postal code: 56182 /56320
- ^{1} French Land Register data, which excludes lakes, ponds, glaciers > 1 km^{2} (0.386 sq mi or 247 acres) and river estuaries.

Priziac (French pronunciation: [pʁizjak]; Breton: Prizieg) is a commune in the Morbihan department of Brittany in north-western France.

== Population ==
Inhabitants of Priziac are called in French Priziacois. The commune's population has been divided by three within a century because of rural exodus.

Historical population

Year	Pop.	±% p.a.
1793	2,079	—
1800	2,071	−0.06%
1806	1,830	−2.04%
1821	2,089	+0.89%
1831	2,021	−0.33%
1836	2,062	+0.40%
1841	2,068	+0.06%
1846	2,252	+1.72%
1851	2,257	+0.04%
1856	2,206	−0.46%
1861	2,214	+0.07%
1866	2,213	−0.01%
1872	2,415	+1.47%
1876	2,636	+2.21%
1881	2,425	−1.65%
1886	2,255	−1.44%
1891	2,519	+2.24%
1896	2,532	+0.10%
1901	2,578	+0.36%

Year	Pop.	±% p.a.
1906	2,830	+1.88%
1911	3,007	+1.22%
1921	2,995	−0.04%
1926	2,957	−0.26%
1931	2,872	−0.58%
1936	2,853	−0.13%
1946	2,722	−0.47%
1954	2,389	−1.62%
1962	1,862	−3.07%
1968	1,640	−2.09%
1975	1,367	−2.57%
1982	1,210	−1.73%
1990	1,074	−1.48%
1999	986	−0.95%
2007	1,026	+0.50%
2012	1,003	−0.45%
2017	976	−0.54%
2023	1,037	+1.02%

Source: EHESS and INSEE (1968-2023)

== Geography ==
Priziac is located in the northwestern part of the Morbihan, 33 km (21 mi) west of Pontivy and 35 km (22 mi) north of Lorient. Historically, it belongs to Vannetais. Near the village centre is the Bel Air lake, with an area of 54 hectares. Apart from the village centre, there are about one hundred hamlets. Most of the hamlets consist in two or three houses but others are larger. In the past, the hamlet of Botquenven had more inhabitants than the village of Priziac.

=== Neighbouring communes ===
Priziac is border by Le Faouët and Langonnet to the west, by Plouray to he north, by Meslan to the south, Saint-Tugdual and Le Croisty to the east.

== Map ==
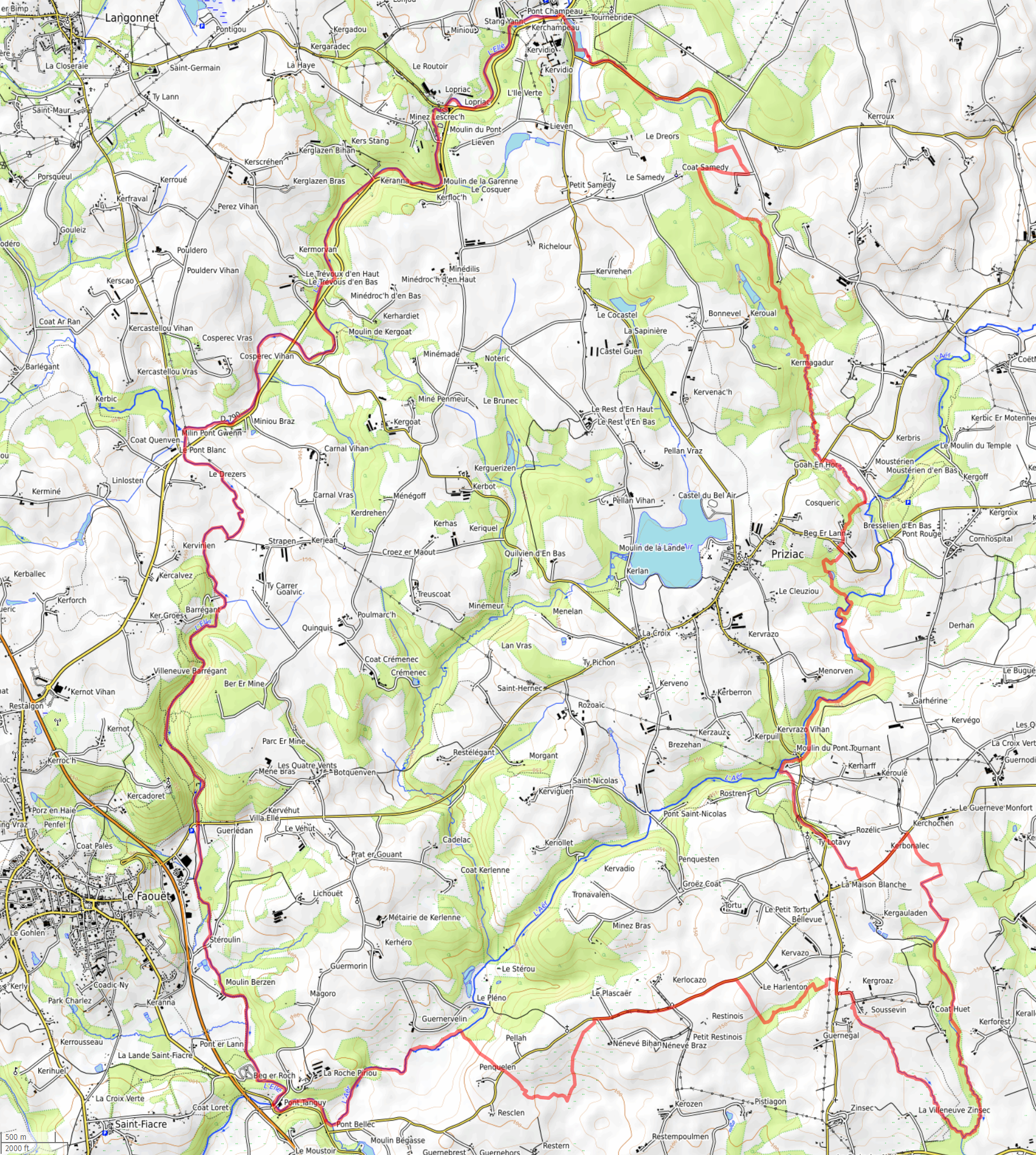
Topographic map

== History ==
=== Middle Ages ===
The fortified castle of La Roche Piriou stood on the top of a hill near the confluence of the river Ellé and the river Aër. It was besieged unsuccessfully by the troops of Walter of Mauny during the War of the Breton Succession

Guy Éder de La Fontenelle, a nobleman at the head of a band of 400 riders, seized the fortified castle of Cremenec, in Priziac, on 10 February 1595.

=== French Revolution ===
The first mayor of Priziac, Jean Le Roux, was murdered by a band of chouans in his house in the village of Kerveno, on 23 December 1794.

== Gallery ==
=== Chapels ===
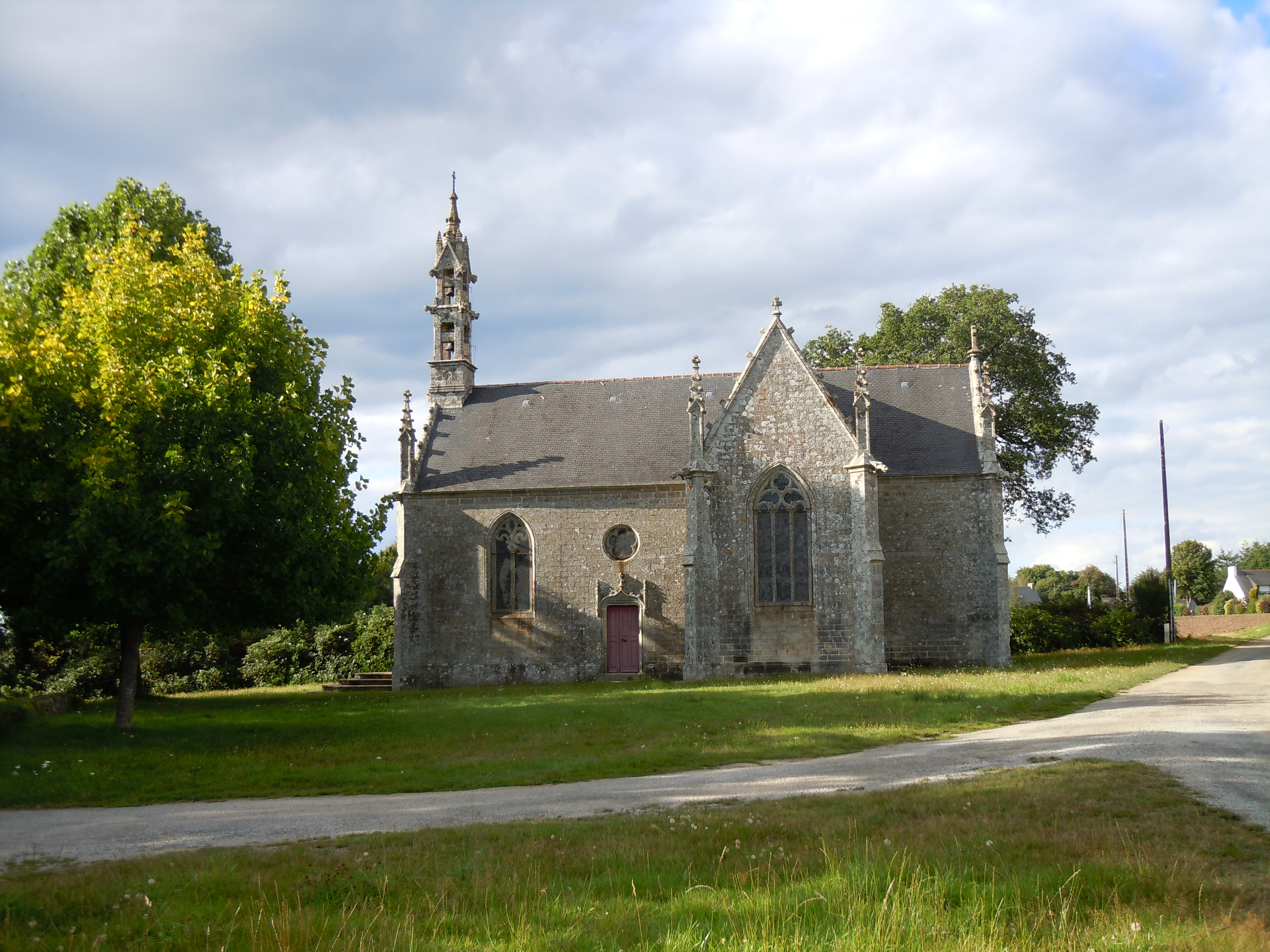
Chapel Saint Yves.

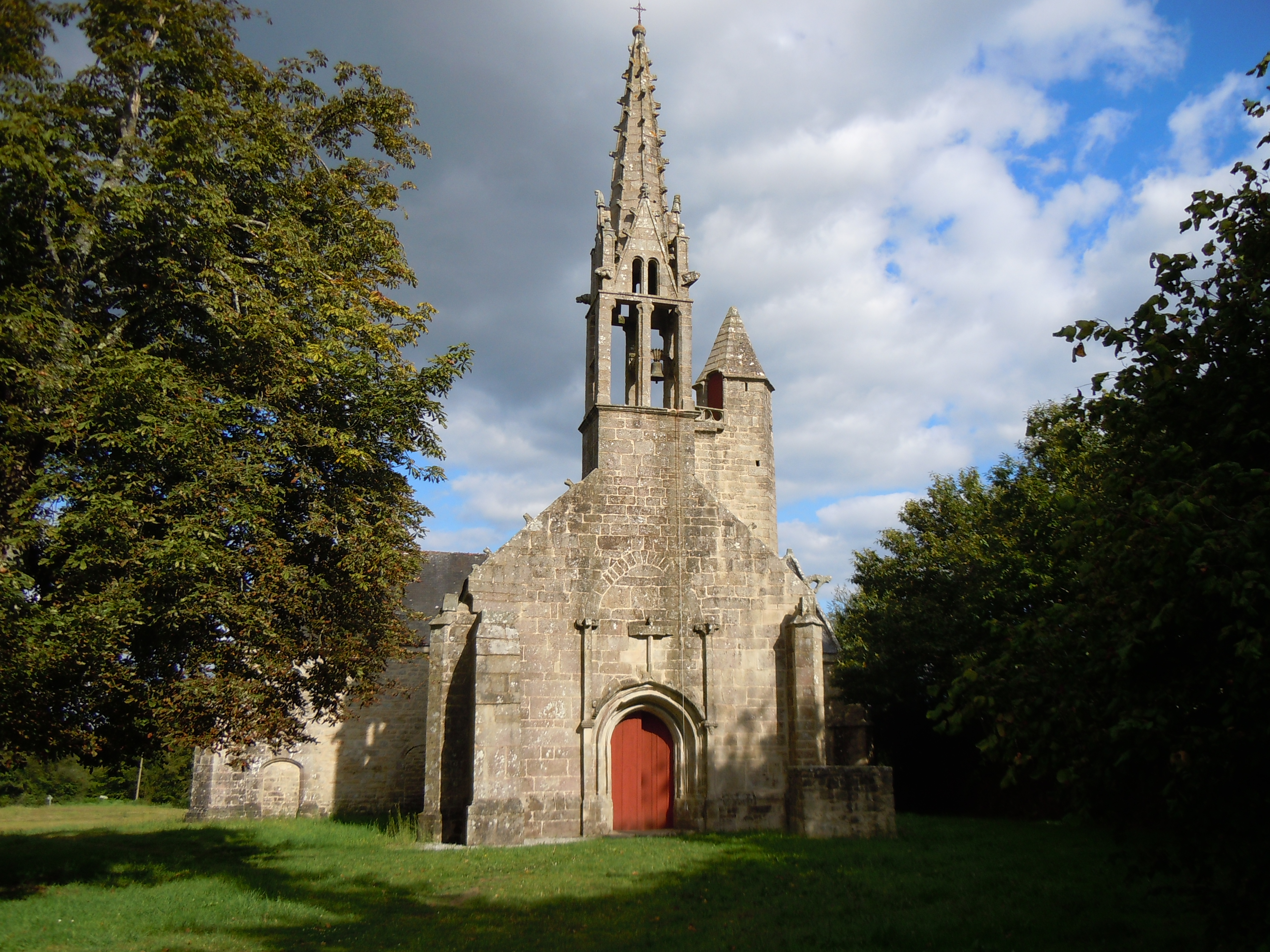
Saint-Nicolas Chapel.

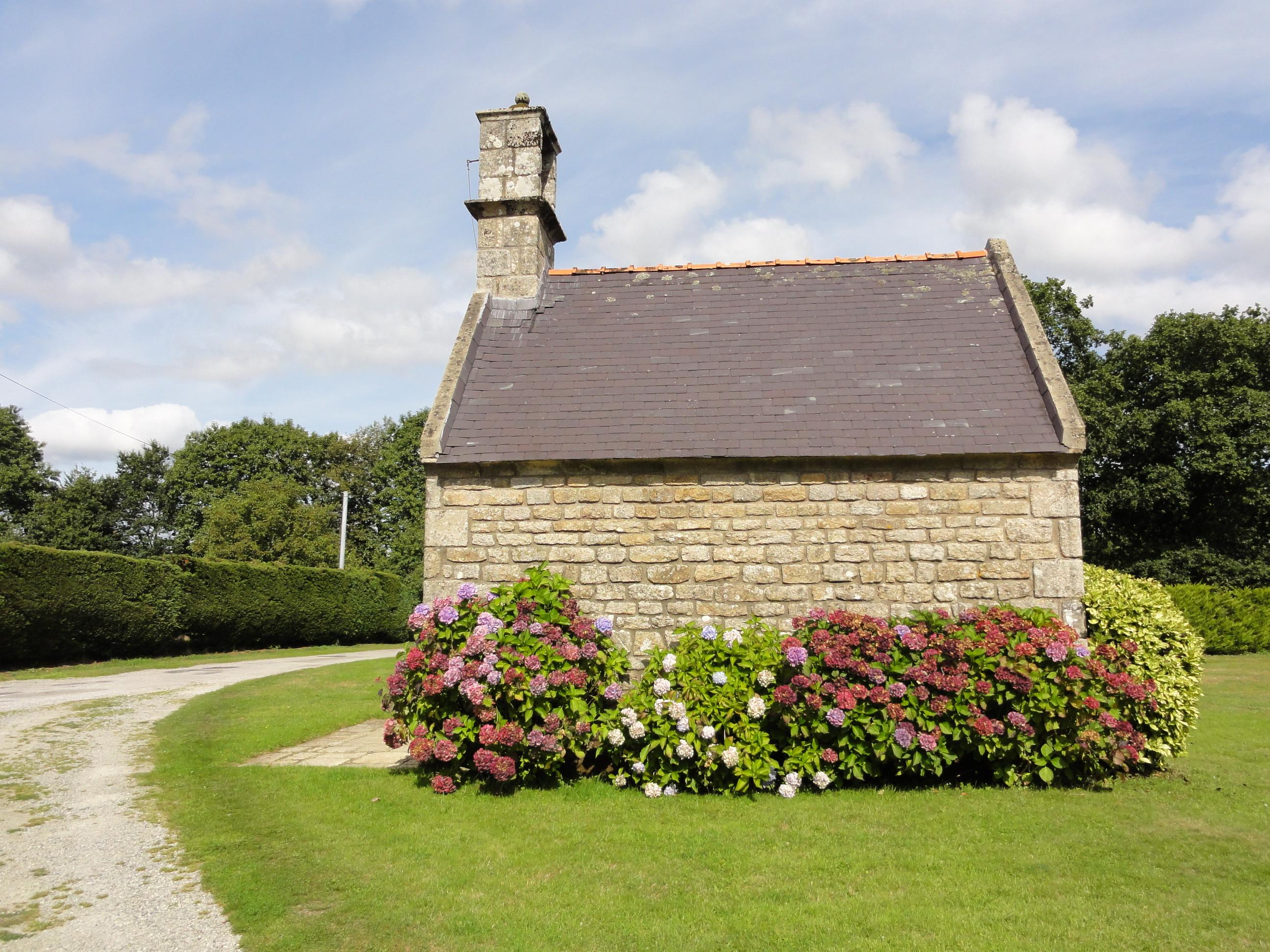
Chapel La Madeleine.

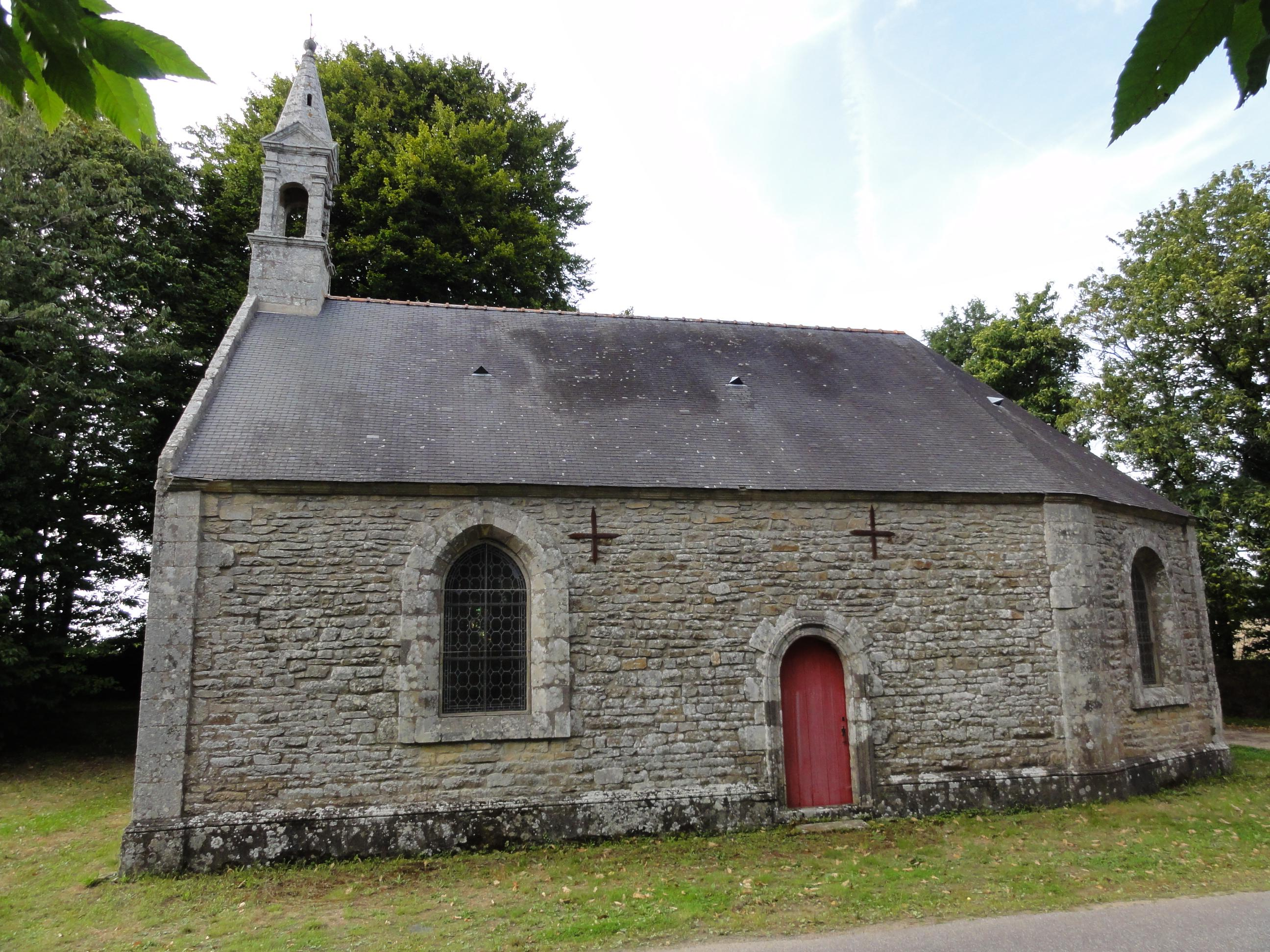
Chapel de Notre-Dame de Poulran.

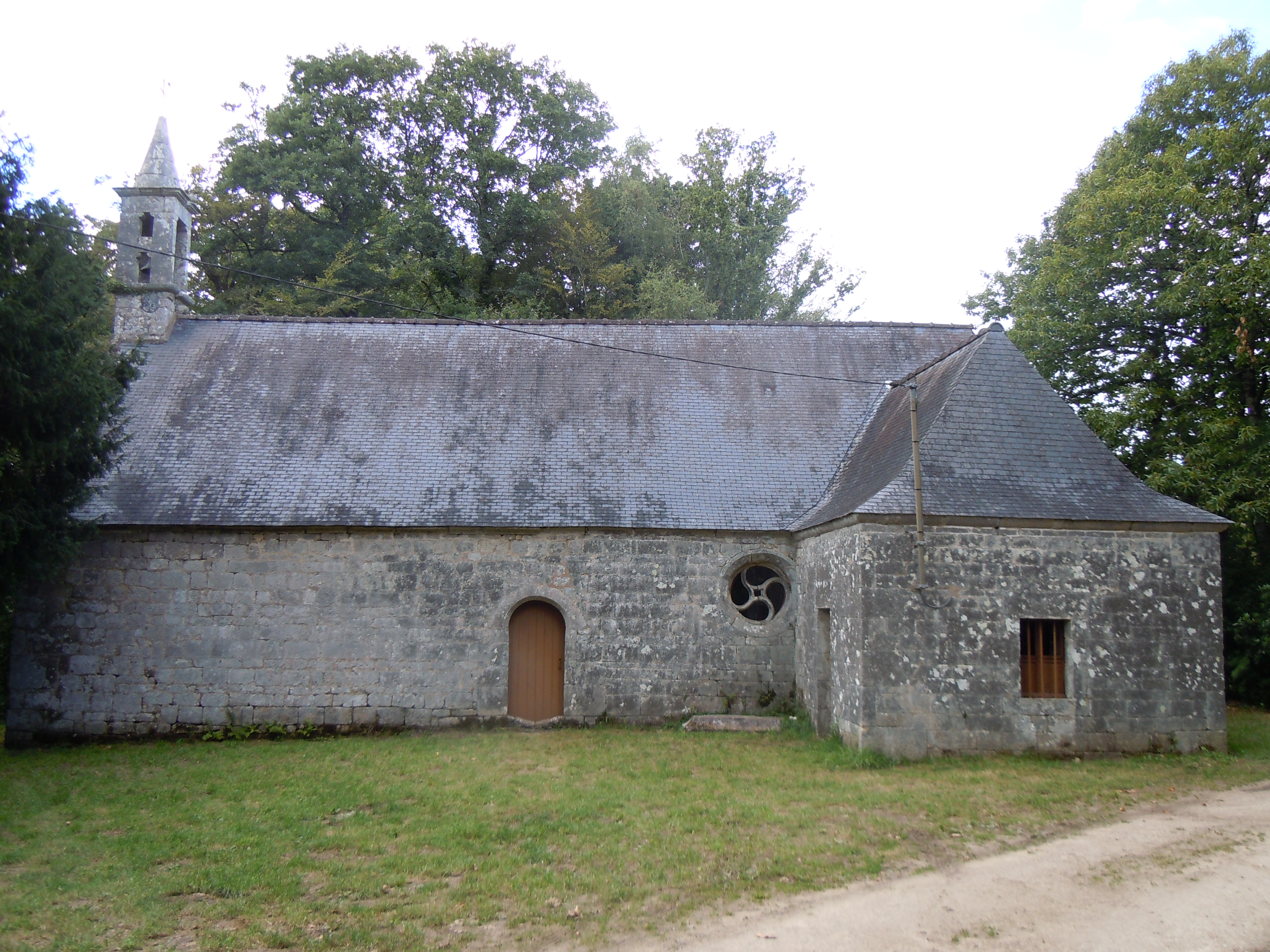
Chapel Notre-Dame de Lotavy.

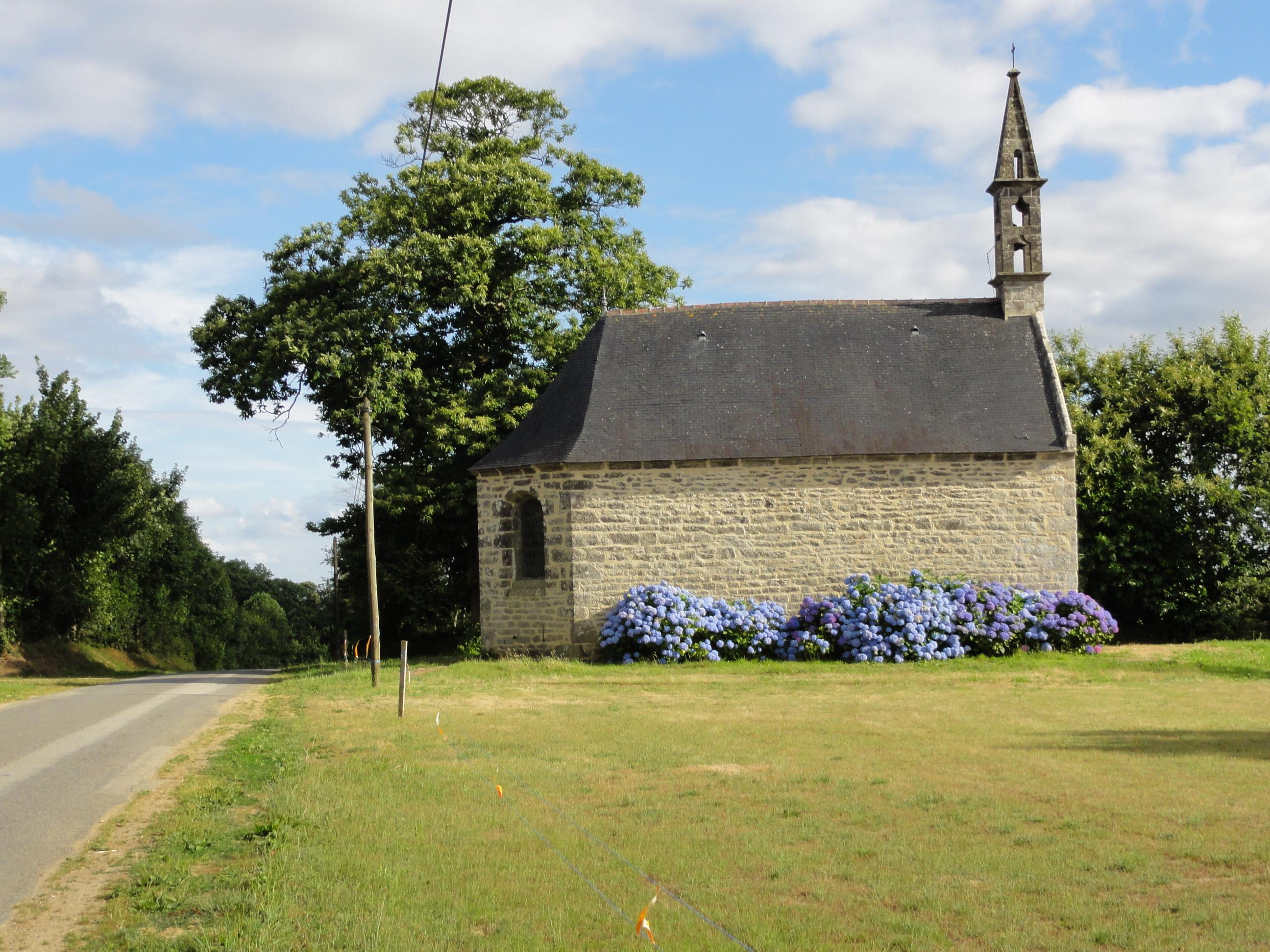
Chapel Saint-Guénolé.

=== Civil heritage ===
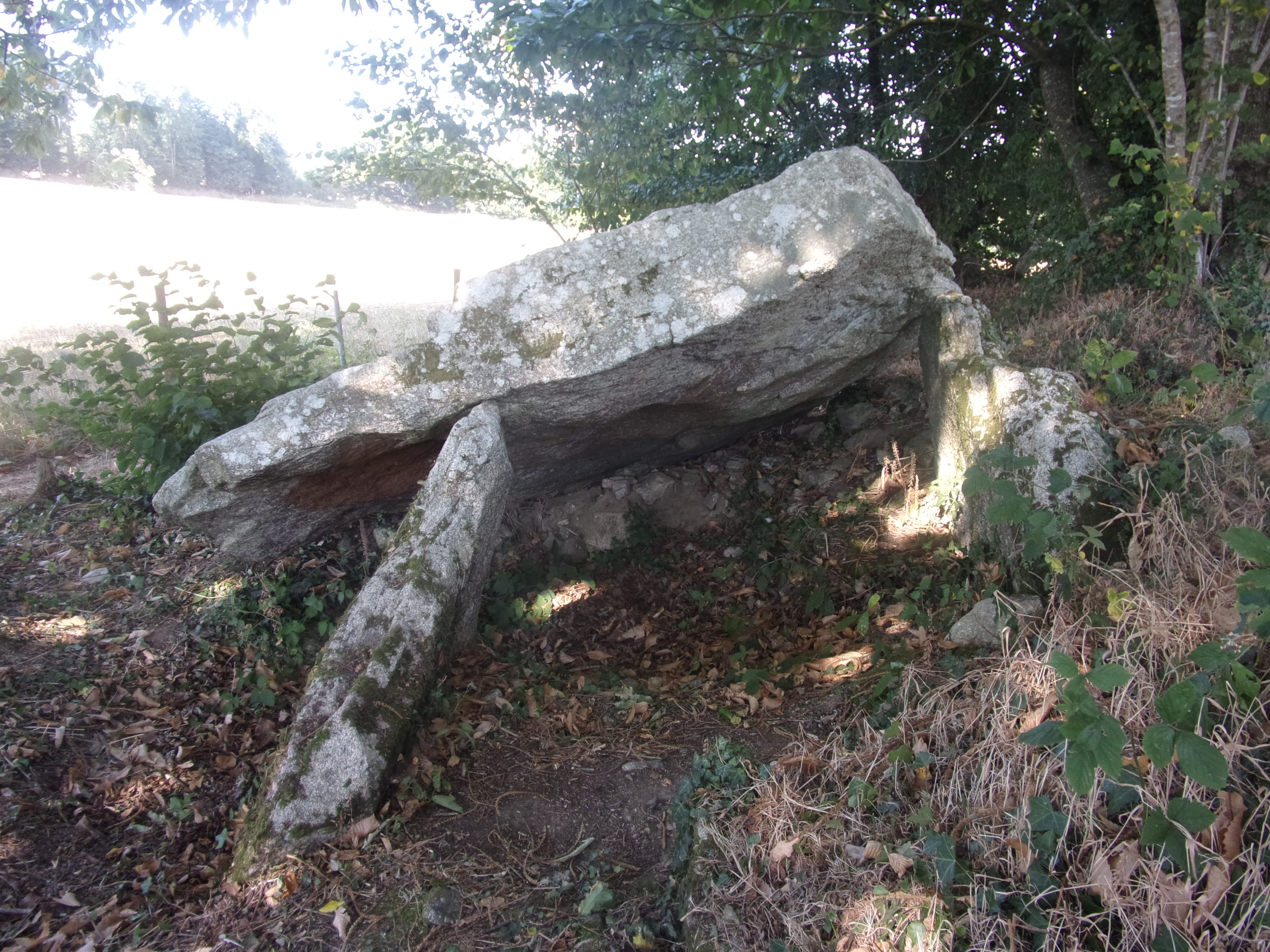
Gallery grave of Botquenven.

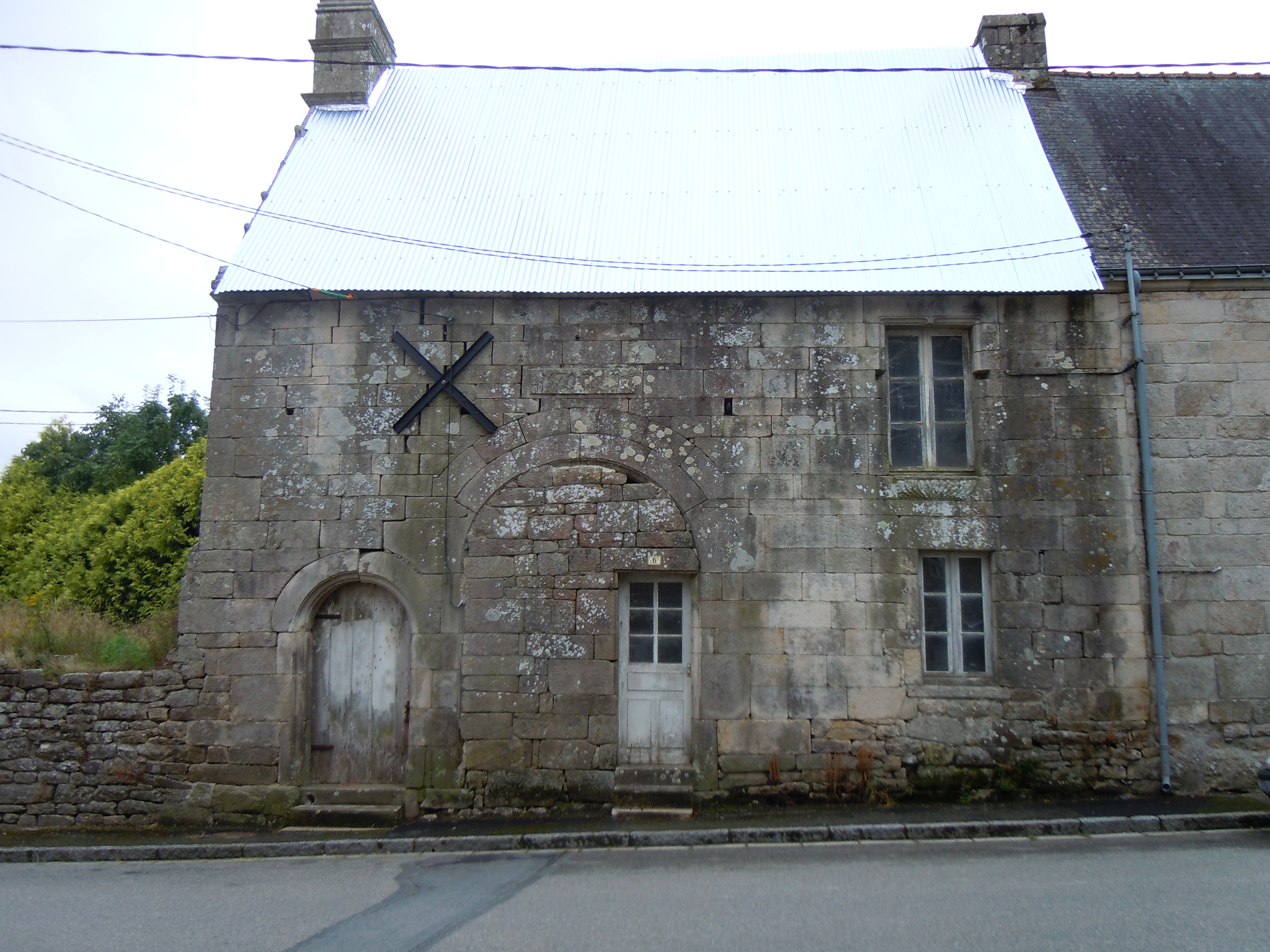
Manor of the Bourg.

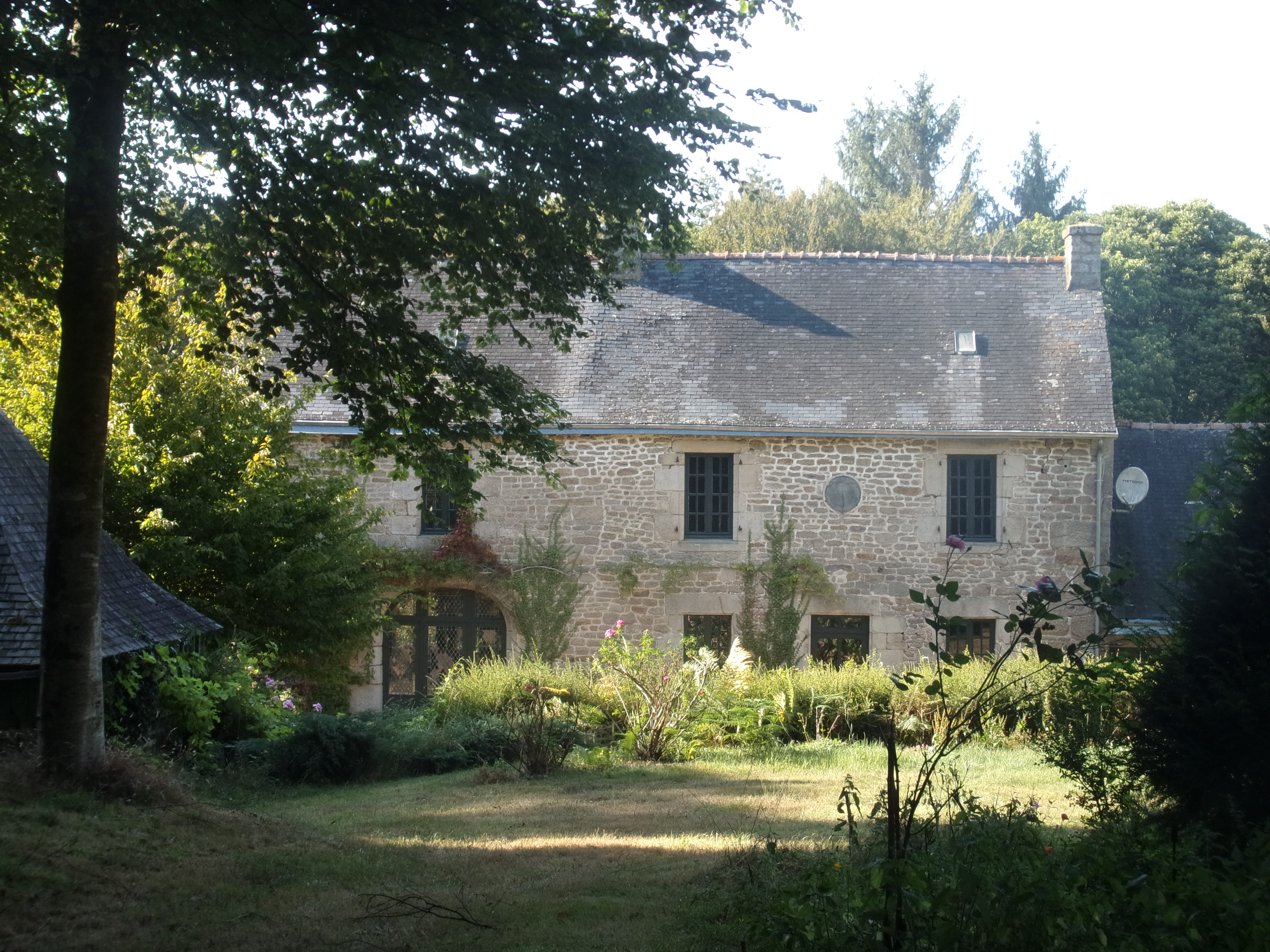
Manor of Plascaër.

=== Landscapes ===
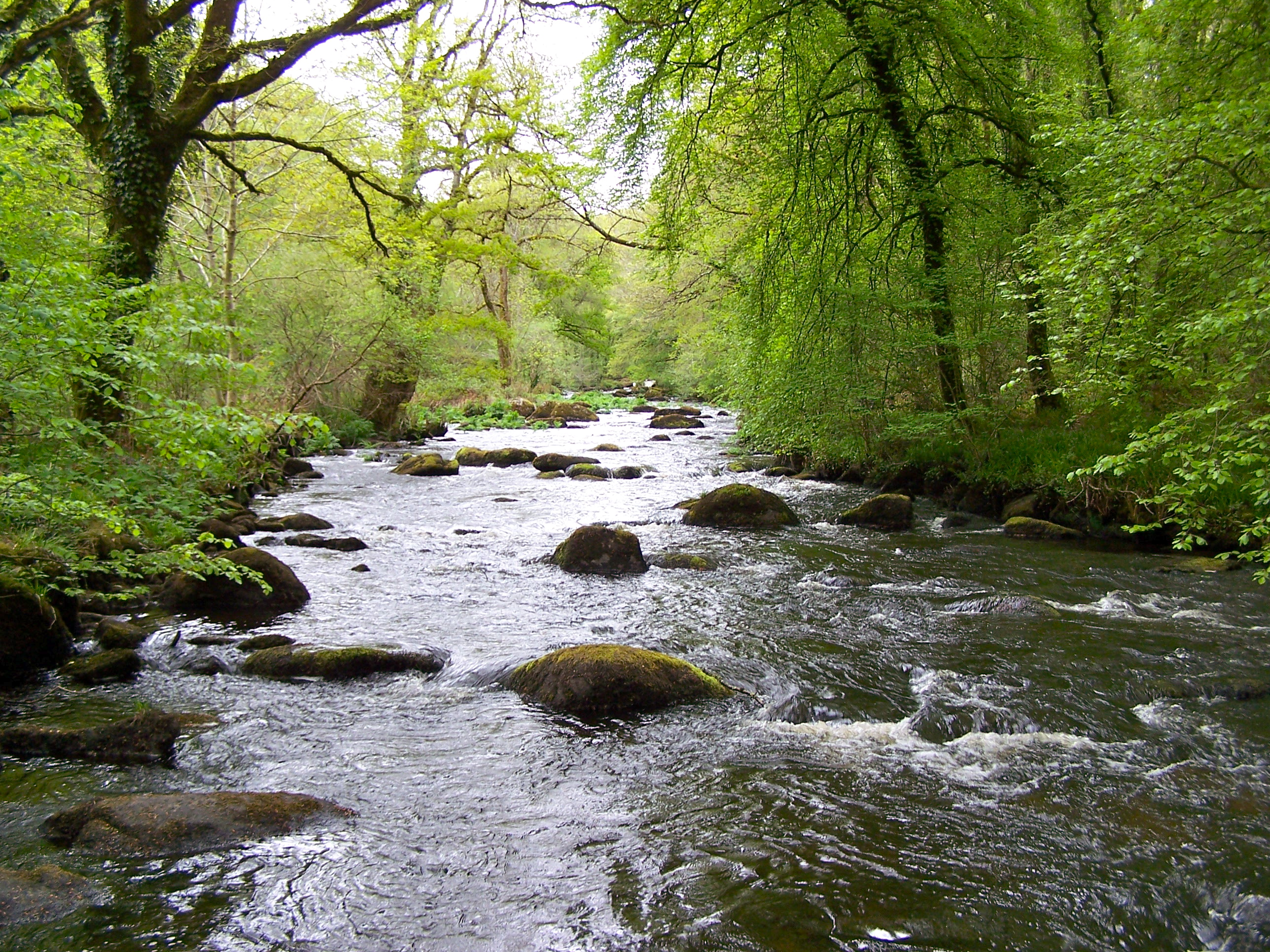
River Ellé

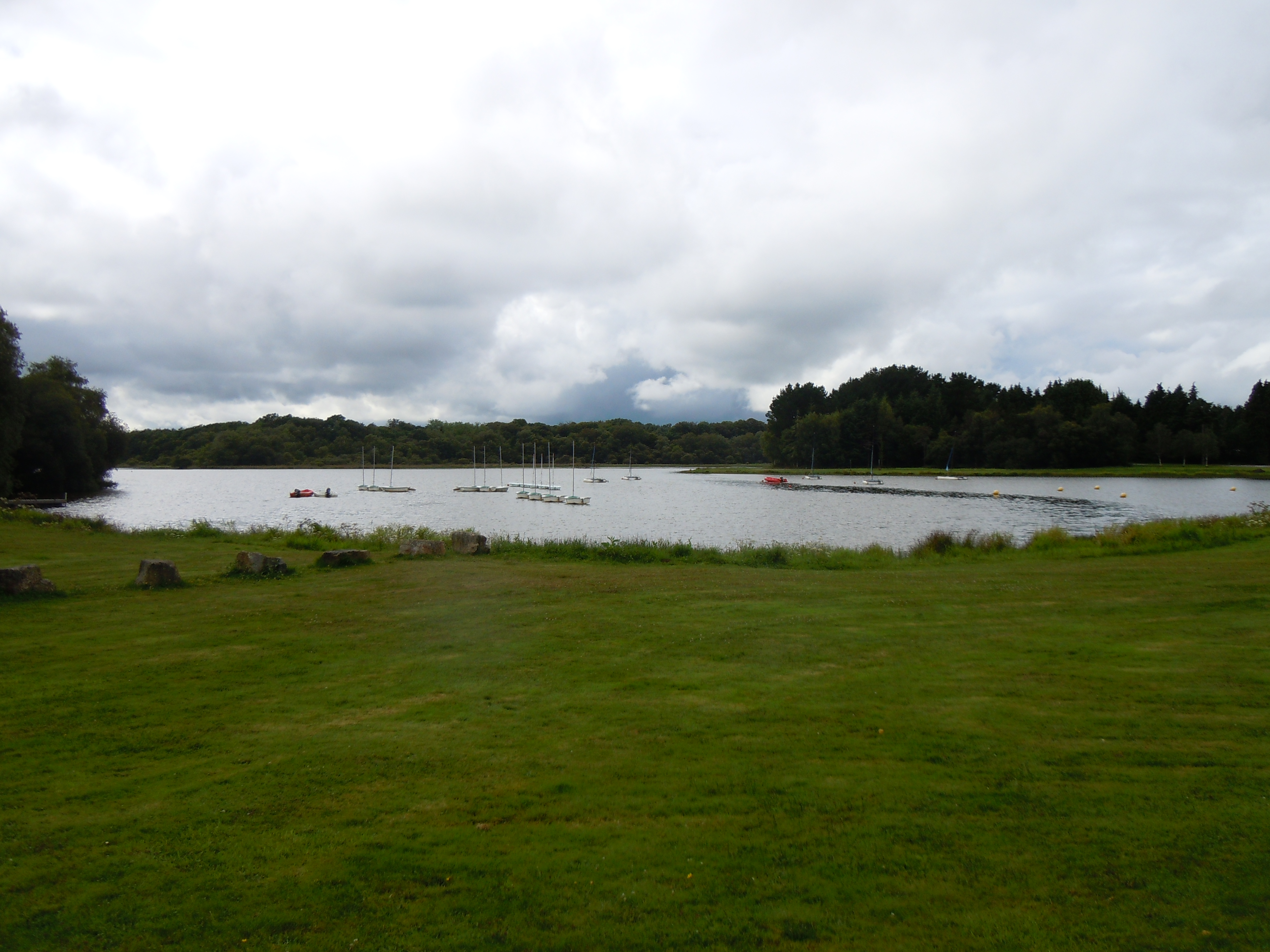
Lake Bel Air

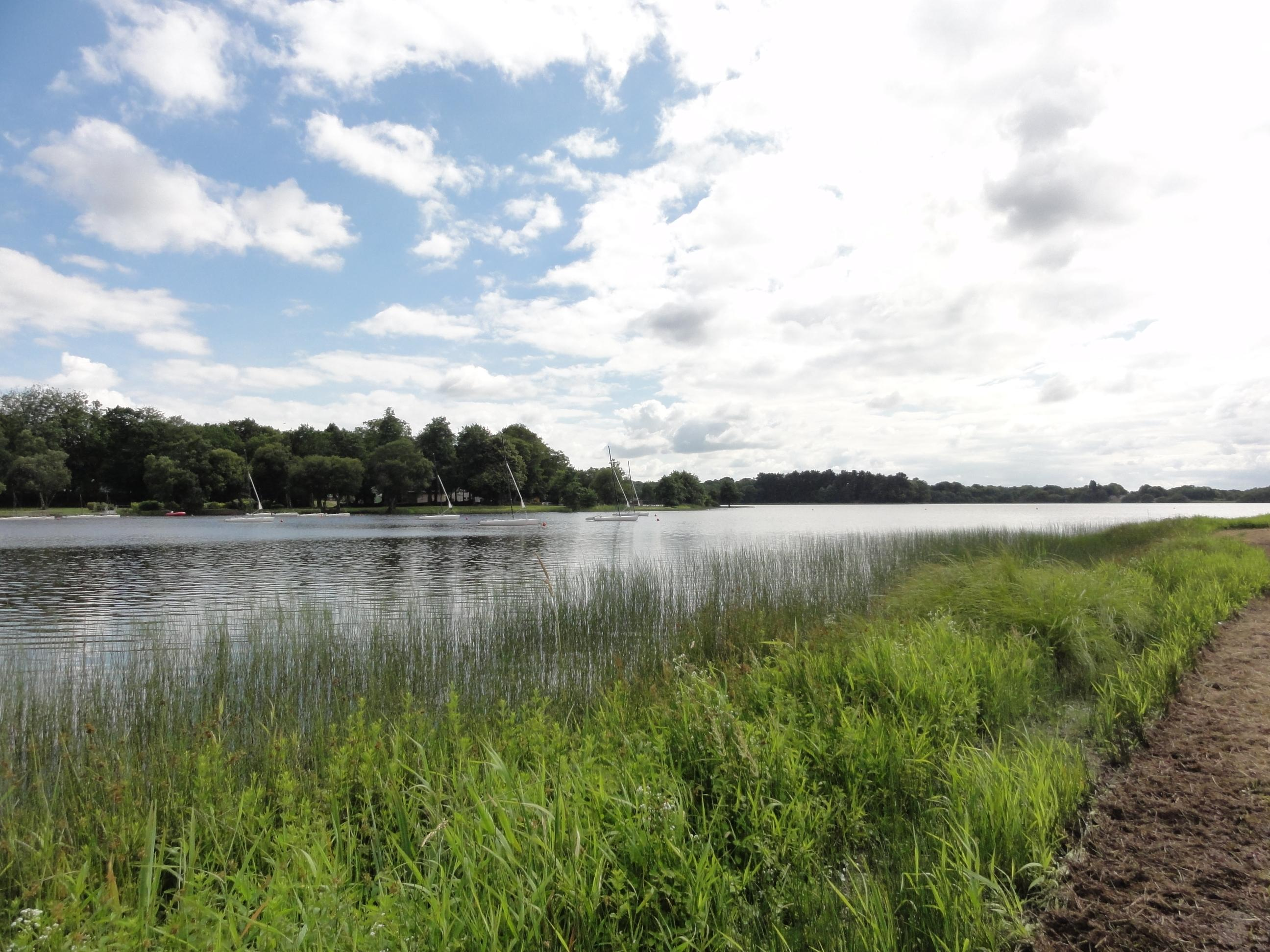
Lake Bel Air

== See also ==
- Communes of the Morbihan department
- Gaston-Auguste Schweitzer Sculptor of Priziac war memorial
