= Langonnet =

Commune in Brittany, France

Langonnet Langoned
- Commune
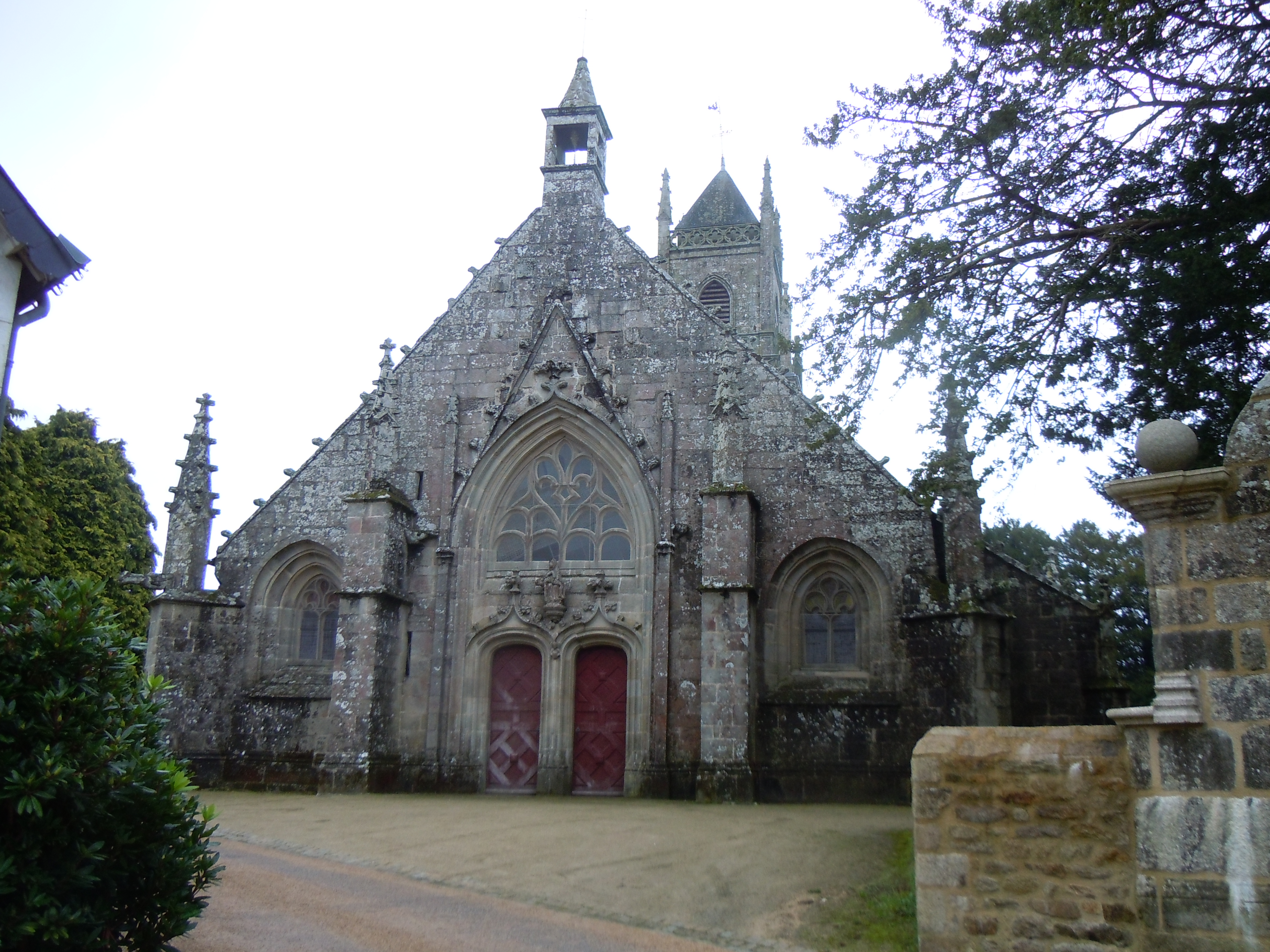
- The Church of Saint-Pierre-et-Saint-Paul, in Langonnet

- Coat of arms
- Location of Langonnet
- Location within France Location within Brittany
- Coordinates: 48°06′23″N 3°29′32″W
- Country: France
- Region: Brittany
- Department: Morbihan
- Arrondissement: Pontivy
- Canton: Gourin
- Intercommunality: Roi Morvan Communauté

Government
  - Mayor (2026–32): Eric Jean
- Area^{1}: 85.40 km^{2} (32.97 sq mi)
- Highest elevation: 292 m (958 ft)
- Lowest elevation: 104 m (341 ft)
- Population (2023): 1,930
  - Density: 22.6/km^{2} (58.5/sq mi)
- Time zone: UTC+01:00 (CET)
  - Summer (DST): UTC+02:00 (CEST)
- INSEE/Postal code: 56100 /56630
- ^{1} French Land Register data, which excludes lakes, ponds, glaciers > 1 km^{2} (0.386 sq mi or 247 acres) and river estuaries.

Langonnet (Breton: Langoned) is a commune in the Morbihan department of Brittany in north-western France.

== Geography ==
Langonnet is in north-west of Cornouaille, in Lower Brittany. It is one of the few Cornouaille parishes to be located in the present-day Morbihan department. Thus, the main language was Breton until the advent of intensive farming after the Second World War, at which point the population, previously bilingual, switched to French.

The parish comprises two main settlements:

- the actual town of Langonnet in the south
- the town of La Trinité-Langonnet in north-east

In the south-east is the former Langonnet Abbey (Abbaye Notre-Dame de Langonnet).

=== Topography ===
The highest point of the parish is the calotte Saint Joseph, a round hill whose top is 292 meters above sea level. It offers a good view of the surrounding area, most of the parish being at 190-meter level.

=== Neighboring communes ===
Langonnet is bordered by Plouray and Priziac to the east, Le Faouët to the south, Le Saint and Gourin to the west and Tréogan, Plévin, Paule and Glomel to the north.

== Map ==
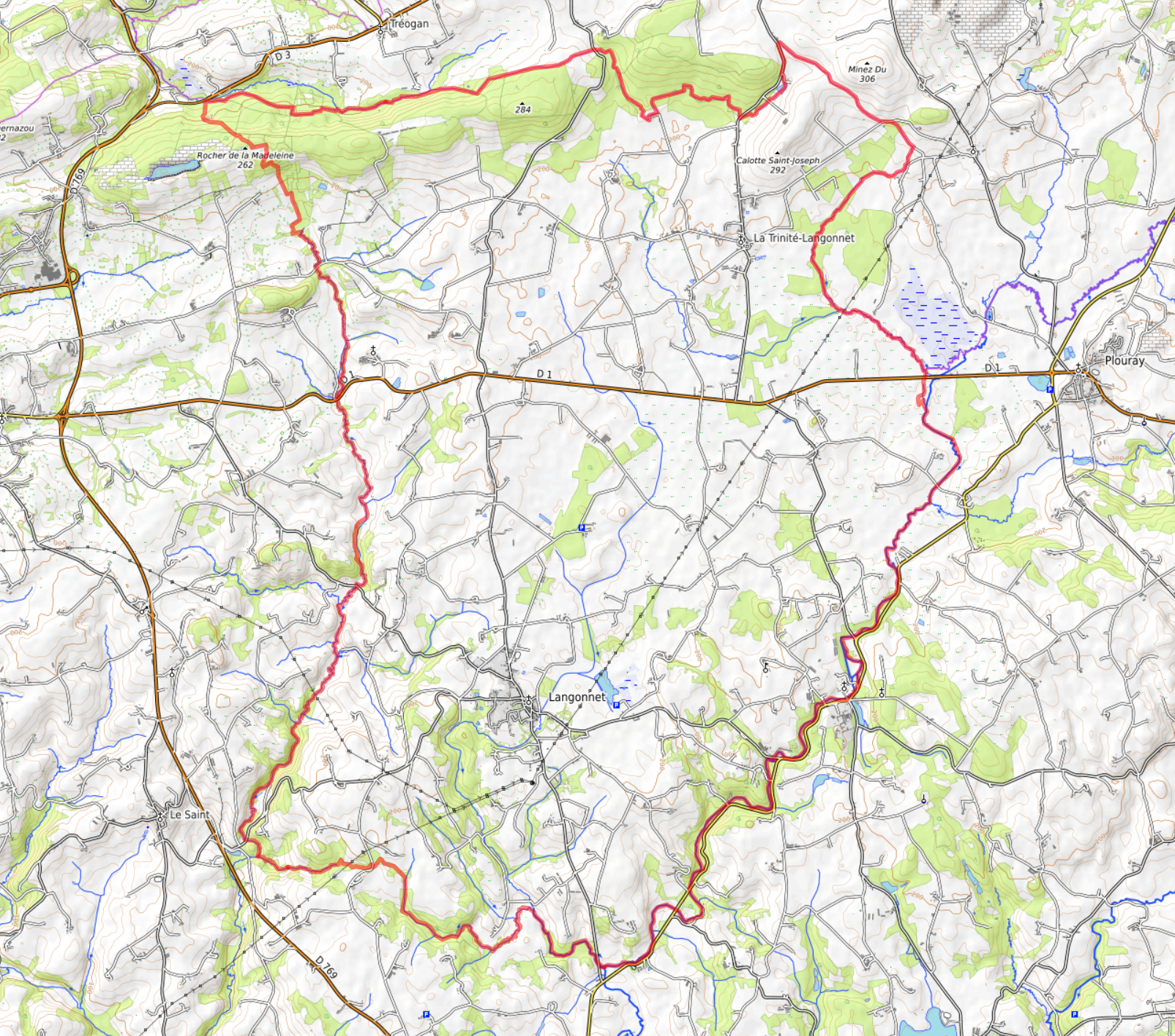
Topographic map

== Toponymy ==
The commune's name is written "Langoned" in modern Breton but has been spelled in various ways through the years due to various attempts to transcribe the Breton phonetic system into the Latin alphabet:

- 11th century : (Lan)Chunuett
- 1152 : Langenoit
- 1161 : Langonio
- 1168 : Lanngonio
- 1301 : Lenguenet
- 1368 : Langonec
- 1368 : Langonio
- 1373 : Languenec
- 1516 : Langonet
- 1516 : Langonio
- 1536 : Langonnet
- 1574 : Langonec
- 1630 : Langouet
- Today: Langoned

The name is said to come from "Lann-Conet", the monastery ("lan" in Breton; compare Welsh "llan", as in Llanelli) of Conet (or Conoit, Konoed, Kon(n)ed, Konoid = Cynwyd, Kynwyd or Kynyd in Welsh), a Welsh saint who was active in Brittany.

== Demographics ==
Inhabitants of Langonnet are called Langonnetais in French and Langonediz in Breton. Langonnet's population peaked at 4,848 in 1931 and declined to 1,930 in 2023. This represents a 60% decrease from the peak census figure.

Historical population

Year	Pop.	±% p.a.
1793	3,306	—
1800	3,020	−1.28%
1806	2,924	−0.54%
1831	2,715	−0.30%
1836	3,432	+4.80%
1841	3,442	+0.06%
1846	3,714	+1.53%
1851	3,442	−1.51%
1856	3,427	−0.09%
1861	3,629	+1.15%
1866	4,024	+2.09%
1872	3,417	−2.69%

Year	Pop.	±% p.a.
1876	3,929	+3.55%
1881	3,673	−1.34%
1886	3,710	+0.20%
1891	3,666	−0.24%
1896	3,681	+0.08%
1901	3,982	+1.58%
1906	4,123	+0.70%
1911	4,450	+1.54%
1921	4,494	+0.10%
1926	4,437	−0.25%
1931	4,848	+1.79%
1936	4,358	−2.11%

Year	Pop.	±% p.a.
1946	4,407	+0.11%
1954	3,420	−3.12%
1962	3,083	−1.29%
1968	2,791	−1.64%
1975	2,373	−2.29%
1982	2,106	−1.69%
1990	2,005	−0.61%
1999	1,918	−0.49%
2007	1,907	−0.07%
2012	1,894	−0.14%
2017	1,757	−1.49%
2023	1,930	+1.58%

Source: EHESS and INSEE (1968-2023)

== Breton language ==
The municipality launched a linguistic plan through Ya d'ar brezhoneg on 27 January 2005.

== Gallery ==
=== Landscapes ===
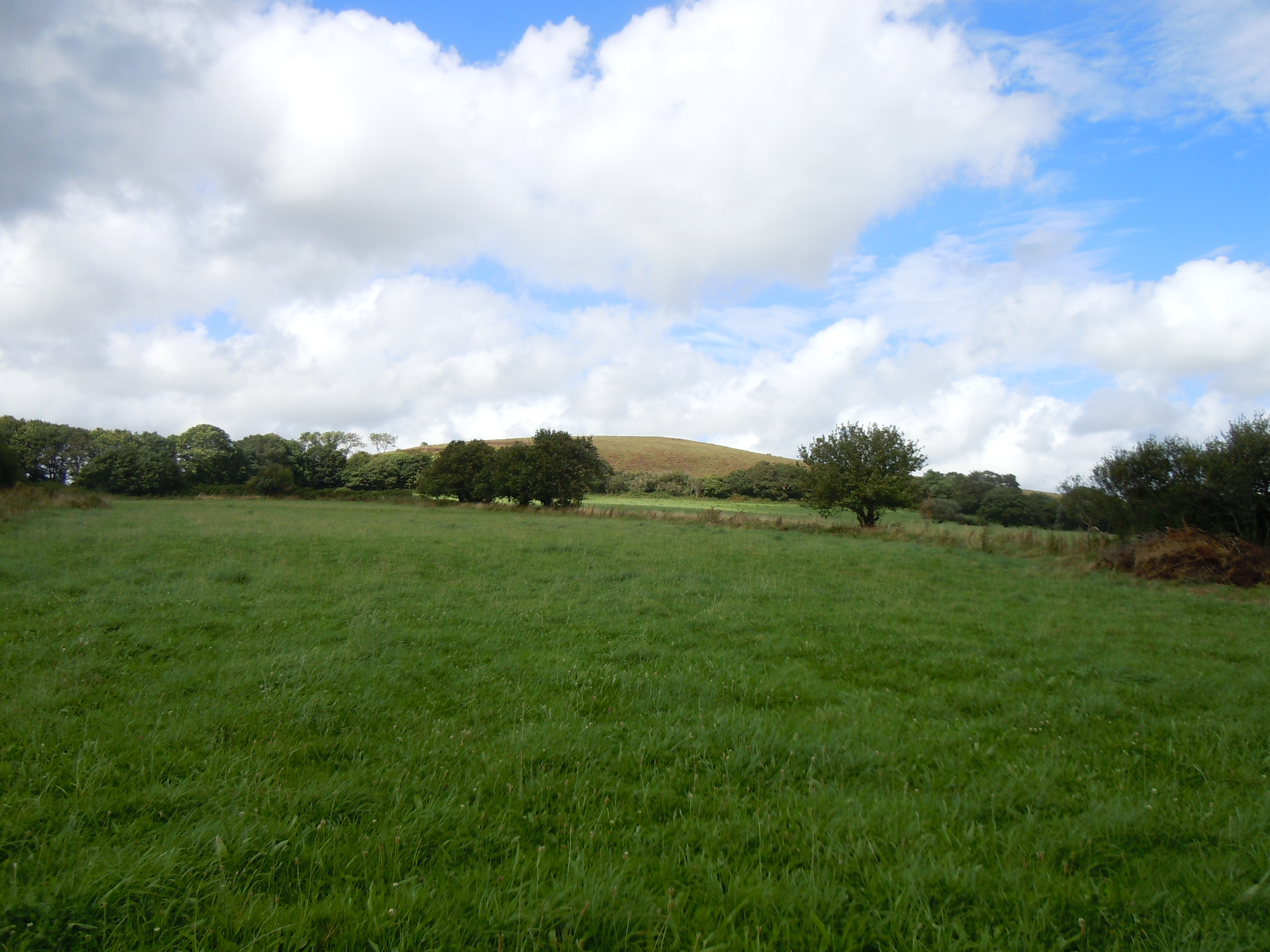
The Calotte Saint Joseph, highest peak of the village

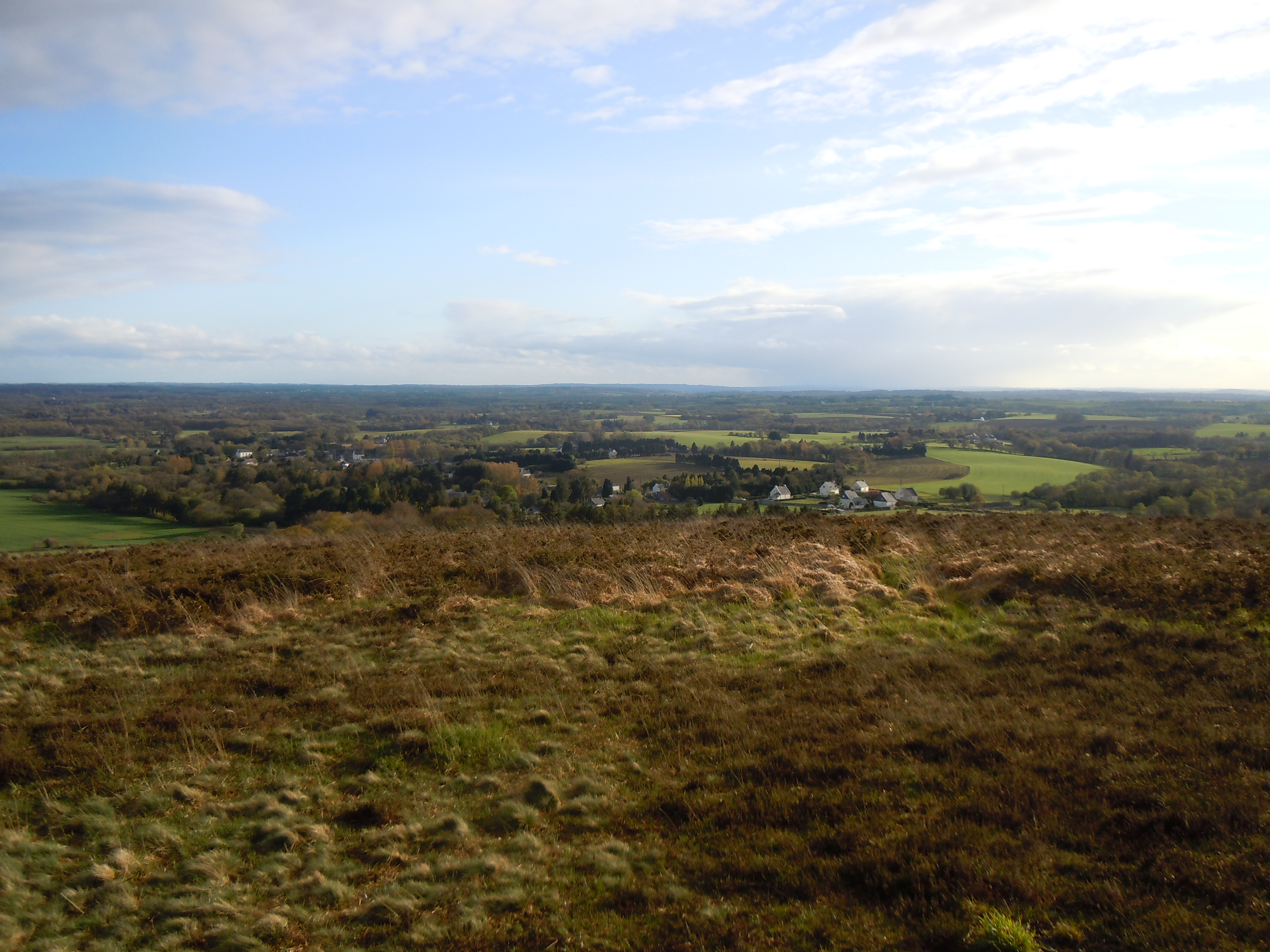
Panoramic view from the top of the Calotte Saint-Joseph

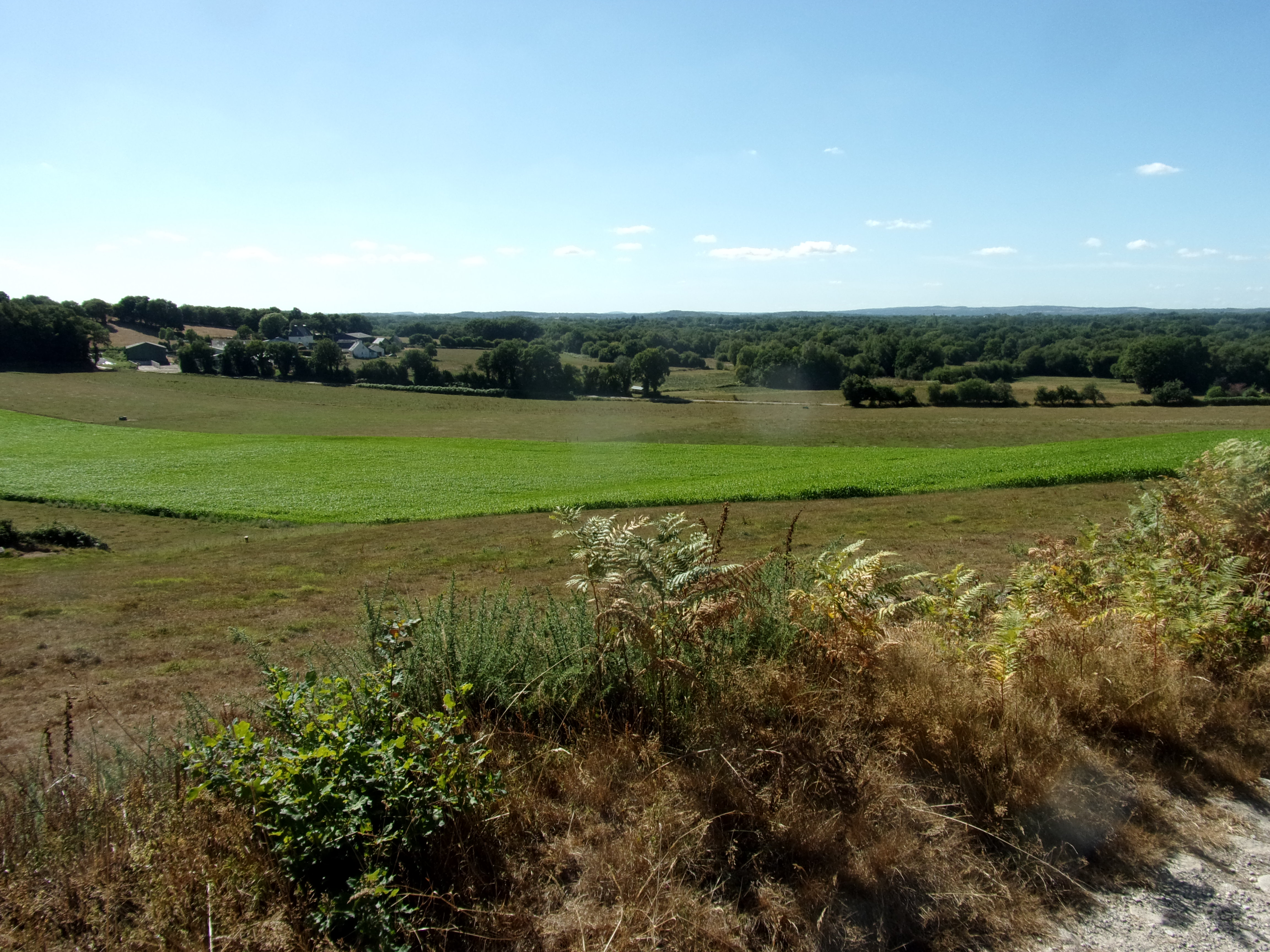
Panoramic view from the top of the Minez Collobert

== See also ==
- Communes of the Morbihan department
