= Saint-Nicolas Chapel, Priziac =

Breton 16th-century chapel

Saint-Nicolas Chapel
- Chapelle Saint-Nicolas
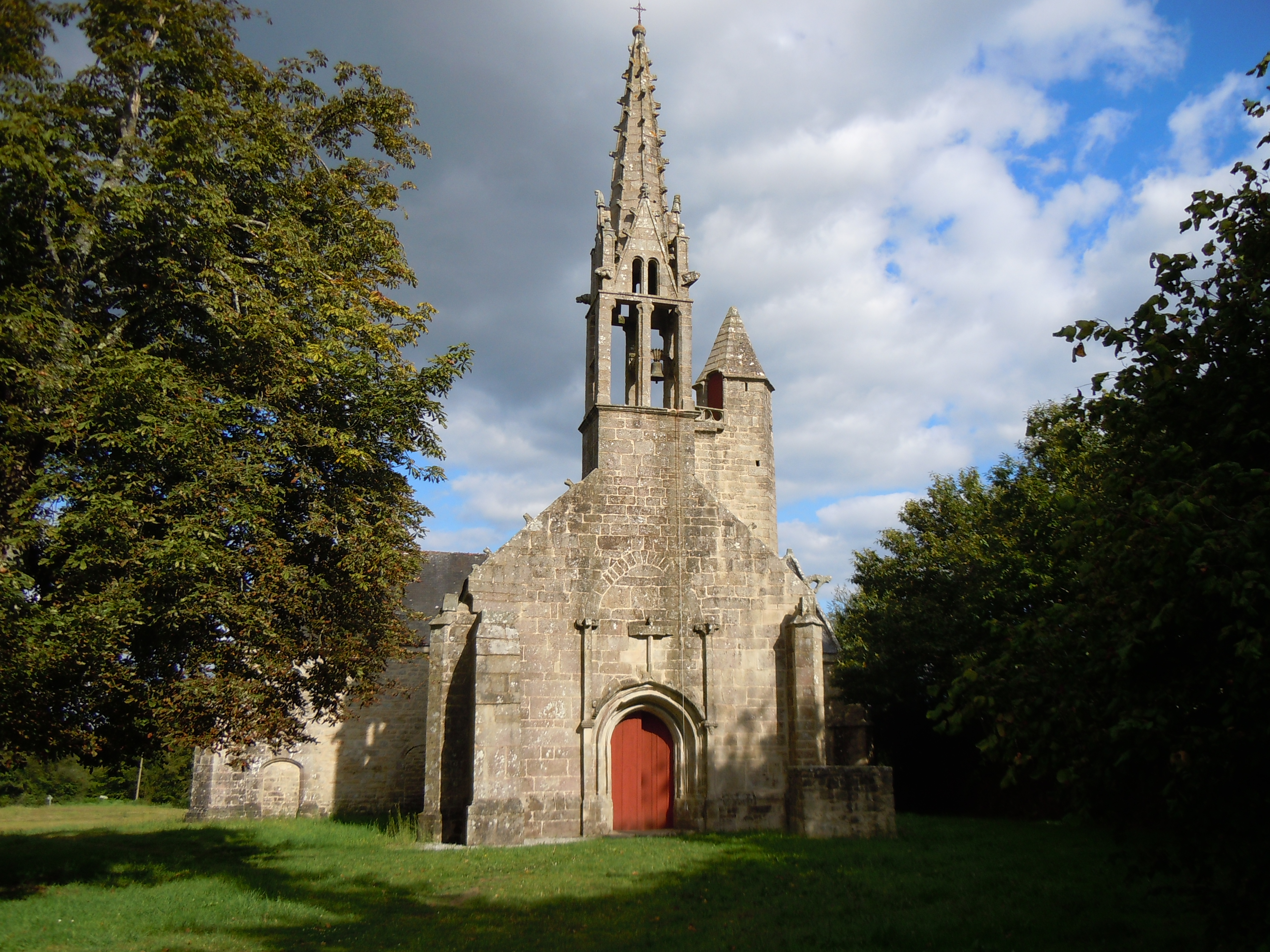
- The west front and bell tower

Religion
- Affiliation: Catholic Church
- Ecclesiastical or organisational status: Chapel

Location
- Location: Priziac, Morbihan
- Country: France
- Interactive map of Saint-Nicolas Chapel
- Coordinates: 48°02′31″N 3°25′55″W

Architecture
- Type: Latin cross plan
- Completed: 16th century

The Saint-Nicolas Chapel (French: Chapelle Saint-Nicolas) is a 16th-century Catholic chapel at Kerviguen in Priziac, Morbihan, in Brittany, France. It has been a Monument historique since 1922. The chapel has a painted wooden rood screen of 1580, one of thirteen in Brittany that survive unaltered. Its late 15th-century stained glass was sent to Trizac in Cantal by mistake and is now in the church there.

== History ==
The chapel is first recorded in 1516. It was built for Yvon Le Digoedel, lord of Kerlen, and remodelled throughout in 1580. The rood screen was classified as a historic object in 1907 and the chapel in 1922. In 1973 thieves took the Virgin and Child from the chapel's Tree of Jesse. It has never been found.

== Architecture and furnishings ==
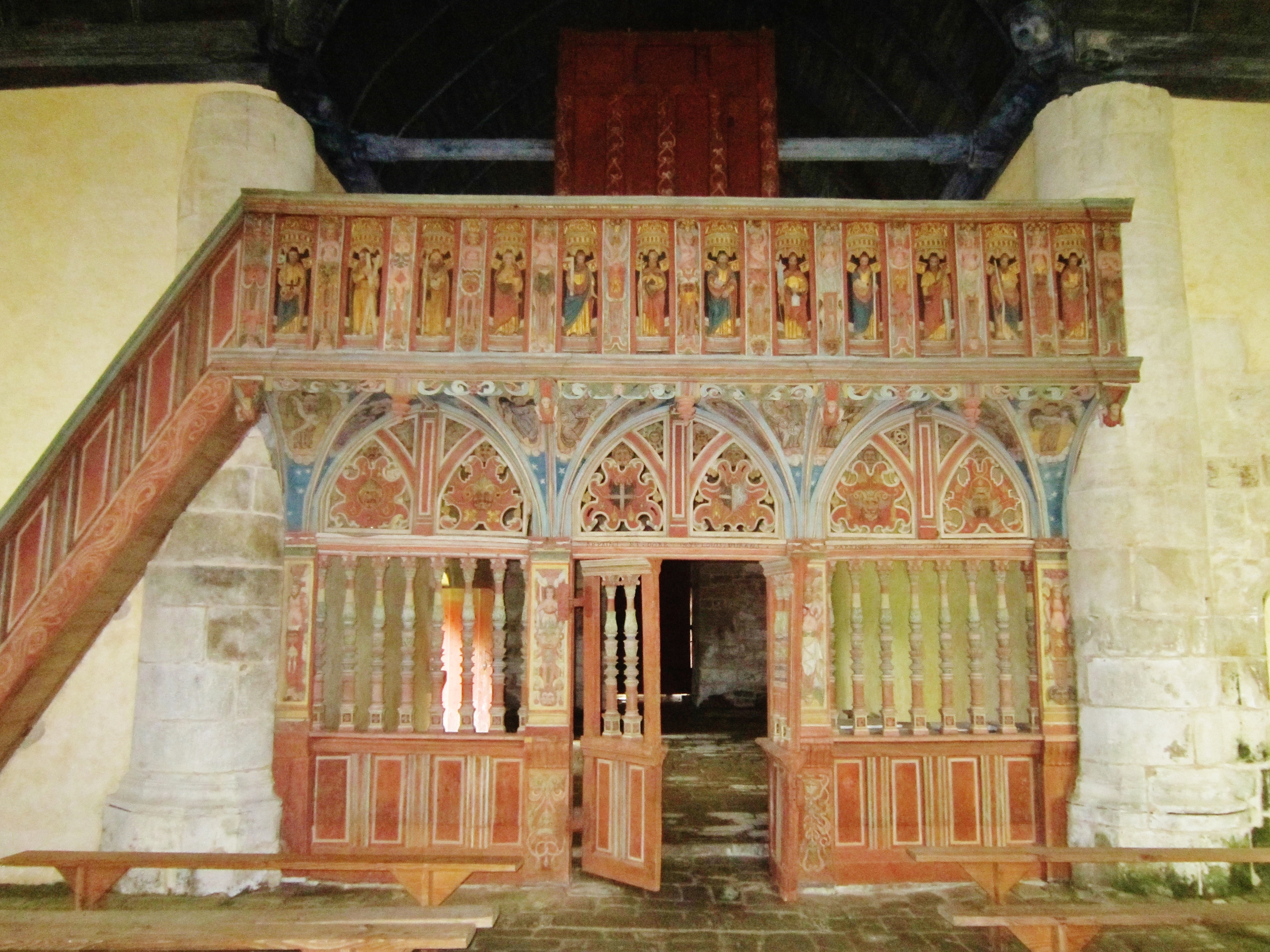
The painted rood screen

The chapel is built of granite on a Latin cross plan. A large mullioned window fills the square east end, and a small open bell turret stands on the west gable.

The wooden rood screen was ordered about 1566, painted in 1580 and repainted in 1768. It is 6.74 metres high. The side facing the choir has statuettes of the twelve apostles, and the nave side has nine carved panels from the life of Saint Nicholas. The screen was taken down and restored in 2000 and 2001.

Other furnishings include a 16th-century wheel of bells in the north transept, once rung at baptisms, and a 16th-century Tree of Jesse in the choir. The south transept holds a polychrome granite Descent from the Cross of the early 16th century.

== Stained glass ==
The east window once held late 15th-century glass with scenes from the life of Saint Nicholas, including the legend of the duck of Montfort. The glass was taken down before the Second World War. In 1978 it was listed at the Monuments historiques depot at Champs-sur-Marne under a wrong label that assigned it to Trizac, about 750 km (470 mi) away. The panels were made into three windows for the church of Saint-Beauzire at Trizac, installed in 1991 and 1993. Françoise Gatouillat and Michel Hérold conclude that the mistake cannot be put right, because the panels have been adapted to their new frames. The east window at Priziac has had new glass since 1996.

== Pardon ==
The chapel's pardon was once known as the Pistolance, a corruption of Prince d'Orange. It recalled a false report of the death of William of Orange after the Battle of the Boyne in 1690. Every year an effigy of the prince was set on a mast, burned and shot down, and the crowd fought over the remains, sometimes with fatal results. This part of the festival was ended in 1828.
