= Saint-Tugdual =

Saint-Tugdual Sant-Tudal
- Commune
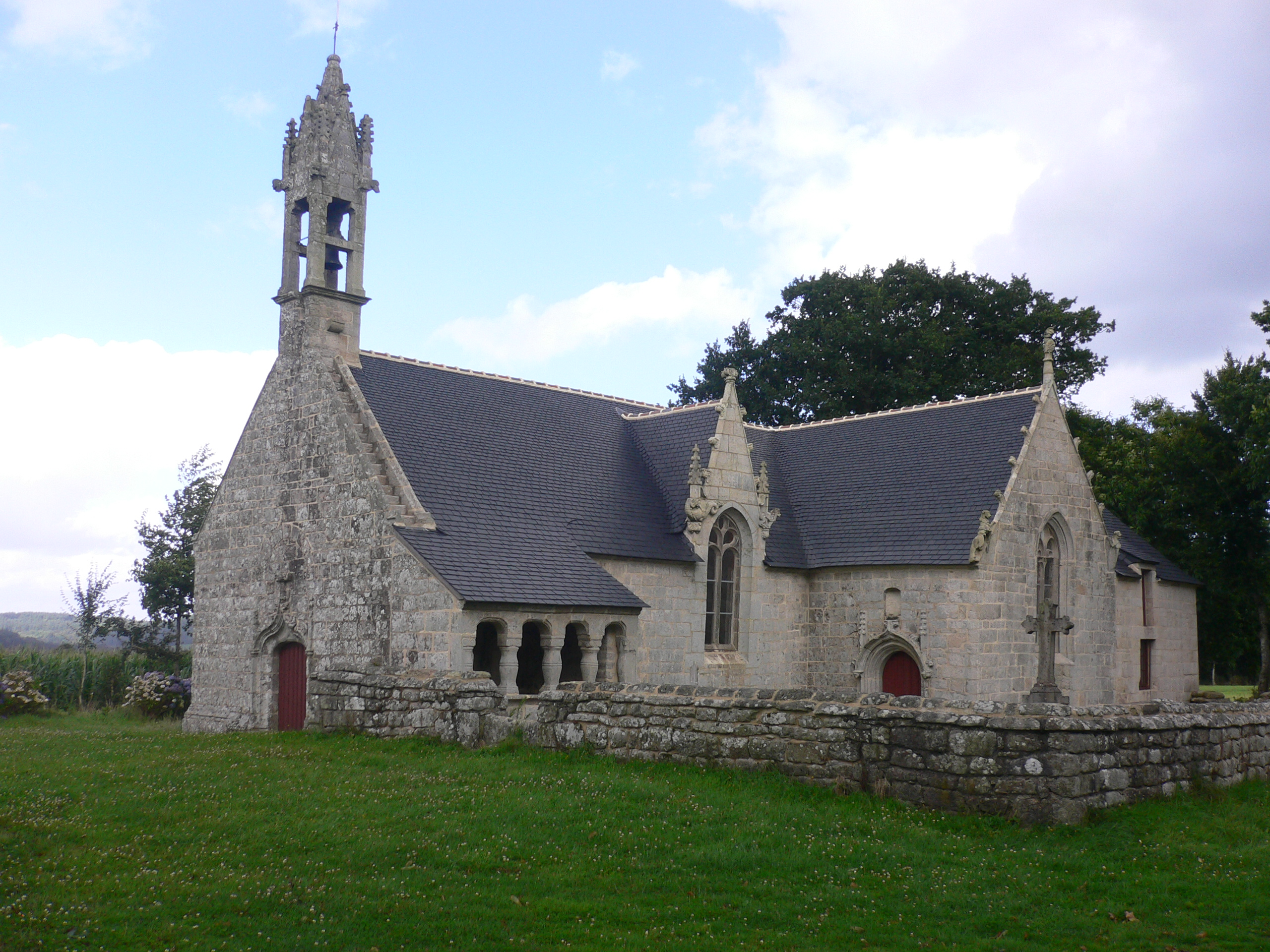
- The Chapel Saint Guen
- Location of Saint-Tugdual
- Location within France Location within Brittany
- Coordinates: 48°05′59″N 3°20′14″W
- Country: France
- Region: Brittany
- Department: Morbihan
- Arrondissement: Pontivy
- Canton: Gourin
- Intercommunality: Roi Morvan Communauté

Government
  - Mayor (2026–32): Raymond Siou
- Area^{1}: 19.97 km^{2} (7.71 sq mi)
- Highest elevation: 276 m (906 ft)
- Lowest elevation: 140 m (460 ft)
- Population (2023): 376
  - Density: 18.8/km^{2} (48.8/sq mi)
- Time zone: UTC+01:00 (CET)
  - Summer (DST): UTC+02:00 (CEST)
- INSEE/Postal code: 56238 /56540
- ^{1} French Land Register data, which excludes lakes, ponds, glaciers > 1 km^{2} (0.386 sq mi or 247 acres) and river estuaries.

Saint-Tugdual (French pronunciation: [sɛ̃ tyɡdɥal]; Breton: Sant-Tudal) is a commune in the Morbihan department of Brittany in north-western France. Inhabitants of Saint-Tugdual are called in French Tugdualais.

== Geography ==
Historically, the village belongs to Vannetais and Pays Pourlet.

== Map ==
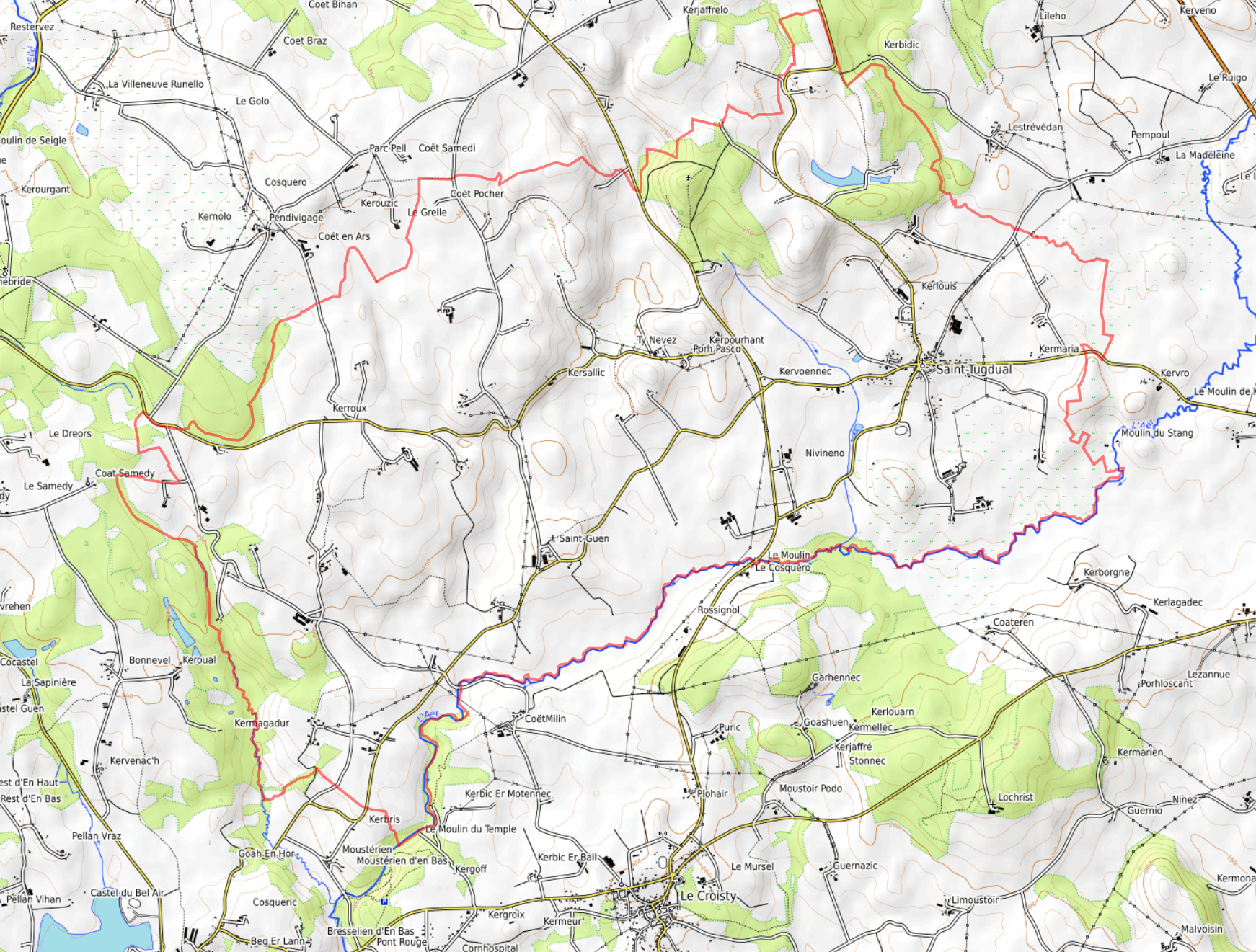
Topographic map

== See also ==
- Communes of the Morbihan department
