= Gaston-Auguste Schweitzer =

French sculptor

- Born: 1 September 1879; Montreuil-sous-Bois
- Died: 15 July 1962 (aged 82); Paris
- Resting place: Père Lachaise cemetery
- Occupation: Sculptor

Gaston-Auguste Schweitzer (born in Montreuil-sous-Bois on 1 September 1879; died in Paris in 1962) was a French sculptor.

== Brief biography ==
His father was from Alsace. He studied at the Paris École des Beaux-Arts under Alexandre Falguière, Antonin Mercié, Paul Auban and Victor Peter. He started exhibiting at the Salon des artistes français in 1903 and in 1908 was awarded a salon medal for the work entitled "L'Aveugle". He gave this work to Pontivy and it stands in the town's square Langlais. Called up in the 1914–1918 war, he developed lung problems and was posted to Pontivy to recuperate and developed an affection for the village and spent much of his life thereafter gravitating between studios in Paris and Pontivy. He was commissioned to work on several war memorials in the Pontivy area, namely those at Bubry, Pontivy, Noyal-Pontivy, Guémené-sur-Scorff, Silfiac, Naizin, Cléguérec and Priziac. He also worked on the monument dedicated to the painter Léon Lhermitte at Mont-Saint-Père in the Aisne. He died on 15 July 1962 and is buried in the Père Lachaise cemetery. Below are further details of Schweitzer's main works

== Works ==
=== Monument to Fernand de Langle de Cary ===
This monument to Fernand de Langle de Cary was erected in 1938 in Pont-Scorff. Schweitzer executed a medallion depicting de Langle de Cary for the monument.

=== "L'Aveugle" ===
This iconic Schweitzer bronze, a study of a blind man tentatively feeling his way forward, can be seen in Pontivy's Jardin de la Roseraie in the rue d'Iéna.

=== Decoration of police station in Paris ===
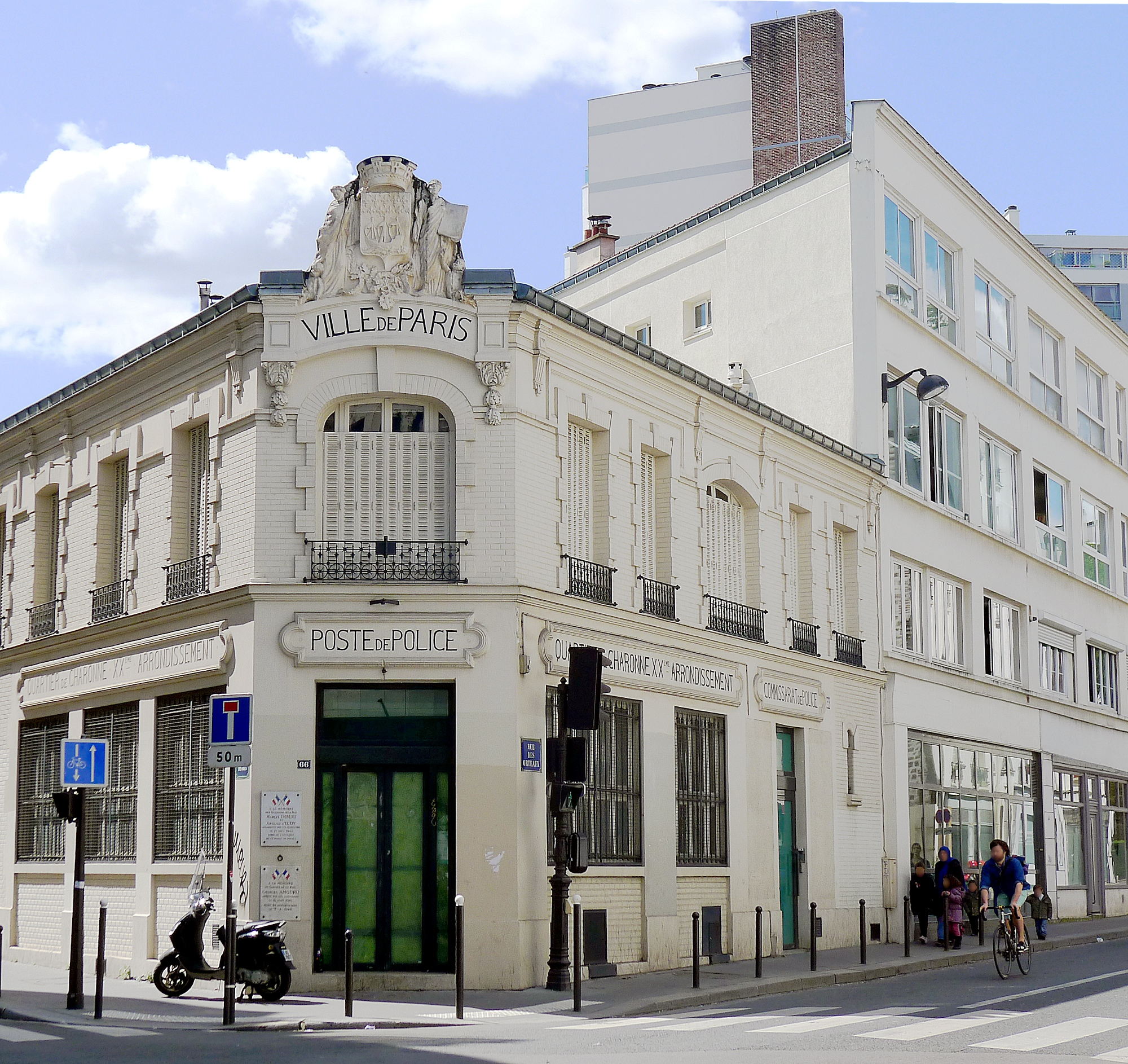
police building in Paris' rue des Orteaux

In 1908, Schweitzer was commissioned to supply sculptural decoration for the police building in Paris' rue des Orteaux. He executed a coat of arms with "Ville de Paris" inscribed beneath it.

=== "L'Adieu" ===
Schweitzer's first sale of an individual piece. This plaster group was purchased by the Ministère des Beaux-Arts for the sum of 3,000 francs.

=== "Le porteur des Halles" ===
This work was exhibited at the Salon des Artistes français in 1913, a forerunner of Schweitzer's prolific output of studies of people in the French markets ("Halles")

=== Plaster figurines ===
Between 1912 and 1962, Schweitzer created many small works in plaster depicting the different people one might see at a French market. These were known as the "petit peuple des Halles".

=== Pontivy War Memorial ===
The war memorial in the rue Jean Moulin dates to 1919–1922 and Schweitzer executed three bronze bas-reliefs which are attached to the granite pedestal. The names of 547 men from Pontivy, all killed in the two World Wars and the conflicts in Algeria and Indochina, are listed on two panels with a bas-relief under each panel depicting the body of a dead soldier, these placed on either side of a central bas-relief which depicts a woman deep in prayer.

=== La Chapelle-Neuve, Morbihan ===
This memorial dates to 1923.

=== Cléguérec War Memorial ===
This monument has a bronze by Gaston-Auguste Schweitzer depicting a soldier throwing a grenade.

=== Bubry War Memorial ===
For this monument Schweitzer created a bronze relief depicting a group of soldiers and a sailor in action. At the top is a gallic cockerel perched on a German helmet. At Bubry there is also a statue in memory of Franchet d'Esperey by Schweitzer.

=== Naizin War Memorial ===
The Naizin war memorial was erected on 15 April 1923 and Schweitzer's relief depicts a wounded soldier and his mother who wears a Naizin bonnet. The memorial has inscriptions in French and in Breton. That in Breton reads

"Parréz nain d'he bugalé marù aveit er vro 1914-1918"

The dead of the Second World War are also remembered.

=== Guémené-sur-Scorff War Memorial ===
For this monument Schweitzer depicted a woman showing a young boy the names of those who had lain down their lives for France. The woman wears the dress of a nun ("moniale")

=== Silfiac War Memorial ===
For this monument Schweitzer executed a relief showing a mother and child laying flowers on the grave of a French soldier.

=== Noyal-Pontivy War Memorial ===
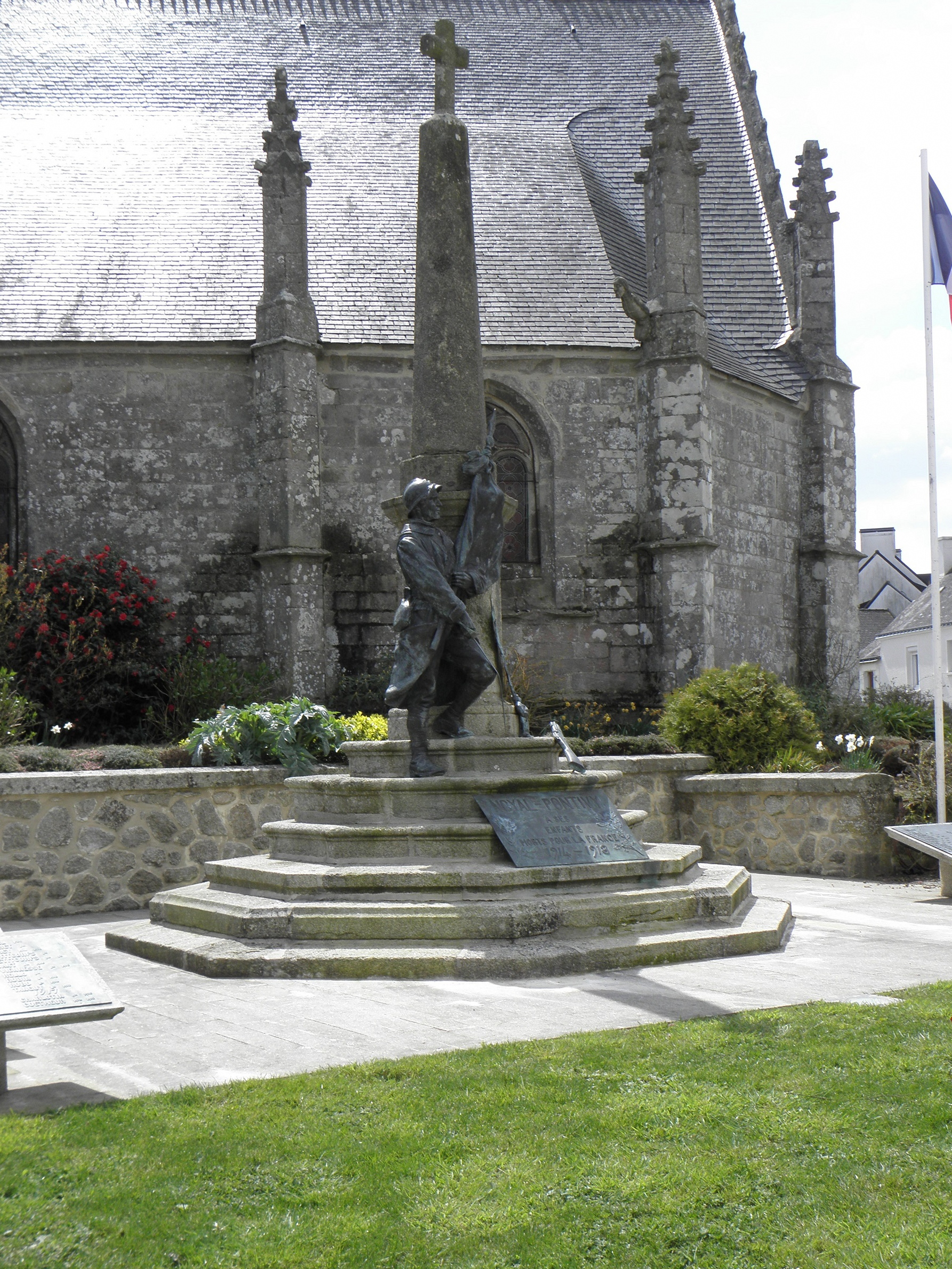
Noyal-Pontivy's war memorial

For this war memorial Schweitzer depicts a soldier.

=== Priziac War Memorial ===
For this war memorial Schweitzer's sculpture depicts a woman holding a wounded soldier.

=== Memorial to Léon Augustin Lhermitte ===
In 1928 Schweitzer was chosen to carry out sculptural work for the memorial to Léon Lhermitte in Mont-Saint-Père. He executed a bust of the painter and at the foot of the pedestal on which this bust was set, he created a sculpture based on Lhermitte's painting "La paye des moissonneurs".
