= The Gleaners (disambiguation) =

The Gleaners is a painting by Jean-François Millet.

The Gleaners may also refer to:

- The Gleaners (Lhermitte), painting
- The Gleaners (Jules Breton) painting
- The Gleaners (album), a 2019 album by Larry Grenadier
