= Léon Lhermitte =

French painter (1844–1925)

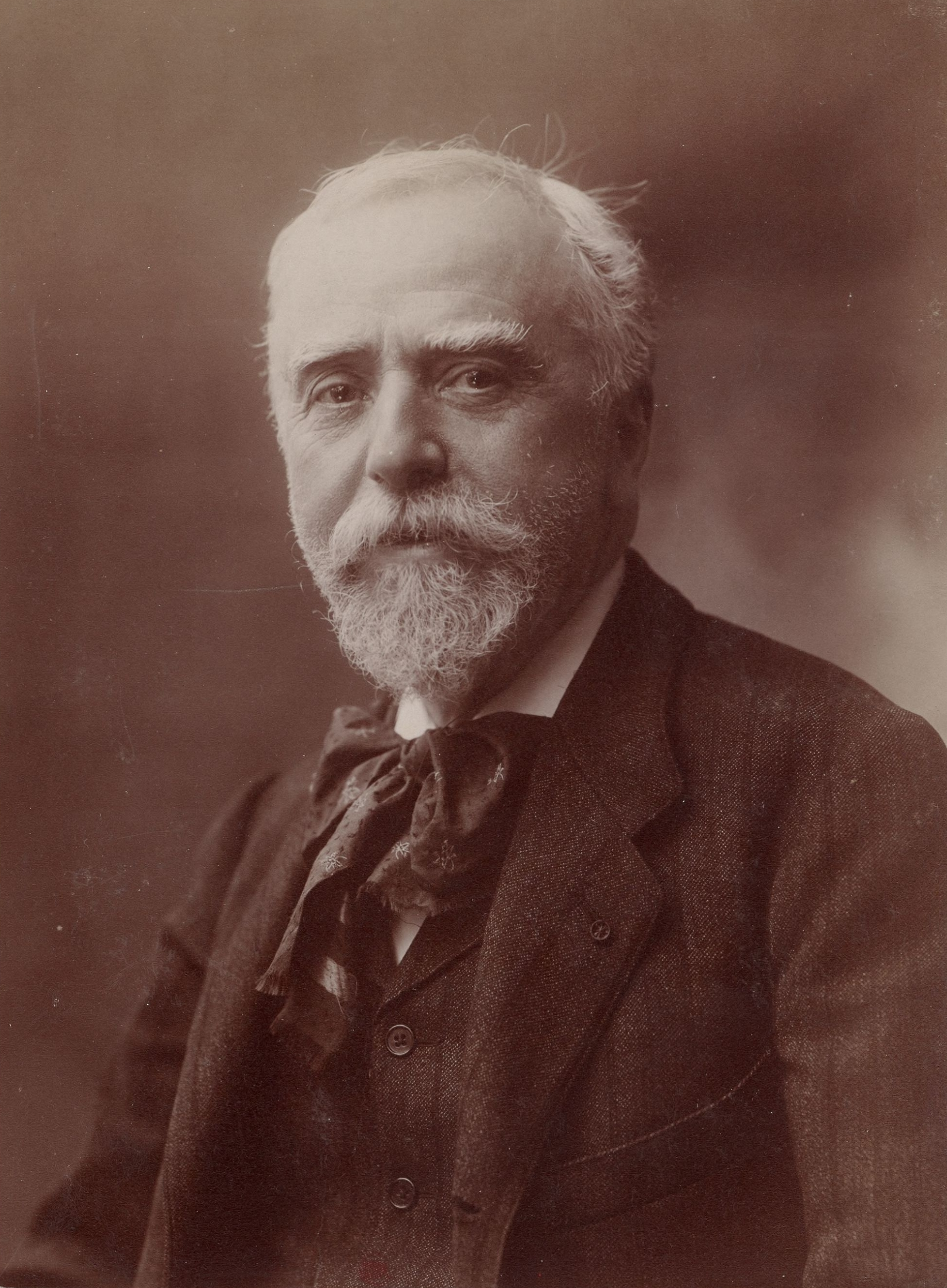
- Léon Lhermitte photographed by Nadar
- Born: Léon Augustin Lhermitte; 31 July 1844; Mont-Saint-Père, France
- Died: 28 July 1925 (aged 80); Paris, France
- Movement: naturalism

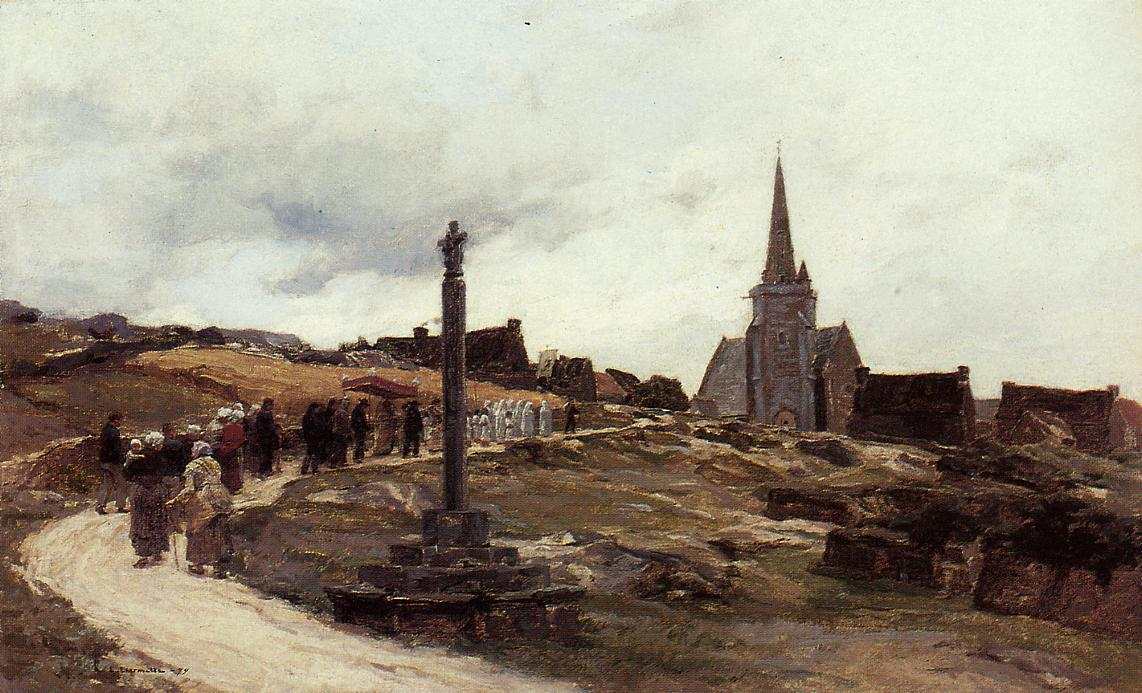
Procession near Ploumanach (1879)

Léon Augustin Lhermitte (French pronunciation: [leɔ̃ oɡystɛ̃ lɛʁmit]; 31 July 1844 – 28 July 1925) was a French naturalist painter and etcher whose primary subject matter was rural scenes depicting peasants at work.

== Life and work ==
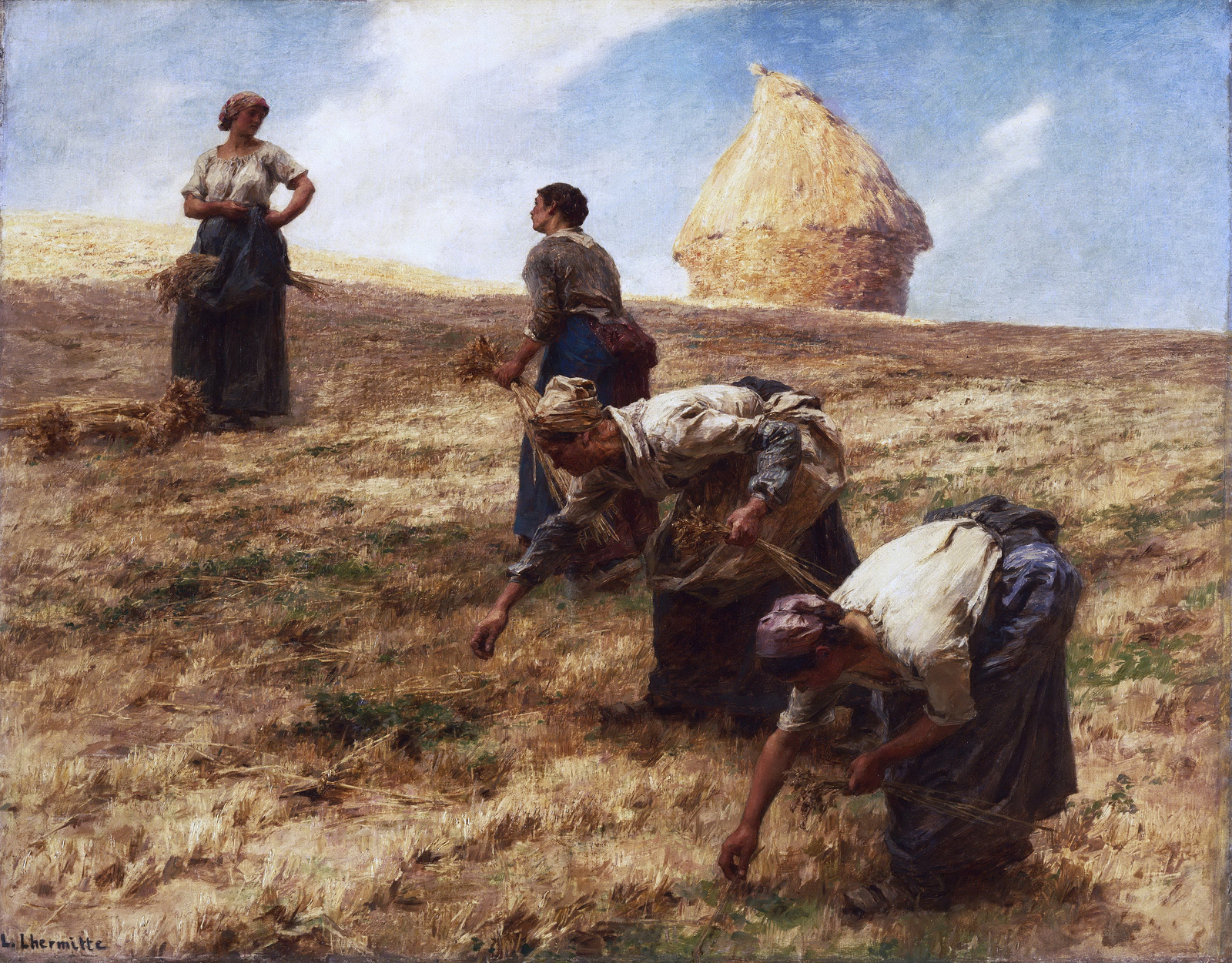
The Gleaners (1887)

Lhermitte was born in 1844 in Mont-Saint-Père in Picardy into a cultivated but modest family. His father, a schoolteacher, noticed his talent for drawing and encouraged him in this area. In 1863, Lhermitte joined as a student the Special School of Drawing and Mathematics, known as the “Petite École” (which became the National School of Decorative Arts in Paris) under the teaching of Horace Lecoq de Boisbaudran. Then, he entered the Paris School of Fine Arts.

The rurality of his native region was his main source of inspiration. Nicknamed the “painter of harvesters”, his works bears witness to the working and peasant social life of his time through scenes of rural or urban work. It was the painting The Harvesters' Pay (1882) that brought him notoriety and recognition from his peers.

Lhermitte enjoyed an international career and recognition. In 1869 he made his first visit to England, where he met Alphonse Legros and became friends with Henri Fantin-Latour and James McNeill Whistler. From then on, he returned regularly to London where he sold his works through the dealers Paul Durand-Ruel and Edwin Edwards.

He exhibited at salons where he received awards on several occasions, and participated as a member of the jury at the second International Exhibition of White and Black in 1886 in the charcoal section, as well as at the Universal Exhibition of 1900, in Paris.

He produced six engravings for L'Eau forte en… (1874–1881), an album published by Alfred Cadart.

He was a member of the delegation of the Société Nationale des Beaux Arts from 1901 to 1905. On October 28, 1905, he was elected a full member of the Academy of Fine Arts in the painting section.

His painting Les Halles exhibited at the Salon of 1895, depicts stalls from the old Les Halles market in Paris. First kept at the Paris City Hall, it was transferred to the Petit Palais, in Paris, in 1904, then stored in 1942, first at the Auteuil municipal depot, then in Ivry. Restored thanks to the patronage of the Rungis market, it is now kept once again at the Petit Palais.

Lhermitte’s innovative use of pastels won him the admiration of his contemporaries. Vincent van Gogh wrote that "If every month Le Monde Illustré published one of his compositions ... it would be a great pleasure for me to be able to follow it. It is certain that for years I have not seen anything as beautiful as this scene by Lhermitte... I am too preoccupied by Lhermitte this evening to be able to talk of other things." Van Gogh, in a letter to his brother Theo van Gogh, wrote also: “When I think of Millet or Lhermitte, I find modern art as powerful as the work of Michelangelo or Rembrandt."

Lhermitte was named rosati of honor in 1902 and was promoted to commander of the Legion of Honour in 1910. He died on 28 July 1925 in Paris.

== Public collections ==
Lhermitte is represented in the permanent collections of museums around the world, including in the Philadelphia Museum of Art, the Metropolitan Museum of Art, the Smithsonian American Art Museum, the Dahesh Museum of Art, the Towneley Hall Art Gallery & Museum, the Glasgow Museums Resource Center, the Victoria and Albert Museum, the Manchester Art Gallery, the Aberdeen Art Gallery and Museums, the Milwaukee Art Museum, the University of Michigan Museum of Art, the Kemper Art Museum, the Thyssen-Bornemisza Museum, the British Museum, the McCord Museum, the Brooklyn Museum, the National Gallery of Canada, the Nelson-Atkins Museum of Art, the Smart Museum of Art, the Chimei Museum, the Saint Louis Art Museum, the Toledo Museum of Art, and the Van Gogh Museum.
