= Langoëlan =

Commune in Brittany, France

Langoëlan Laoulan
- Commune
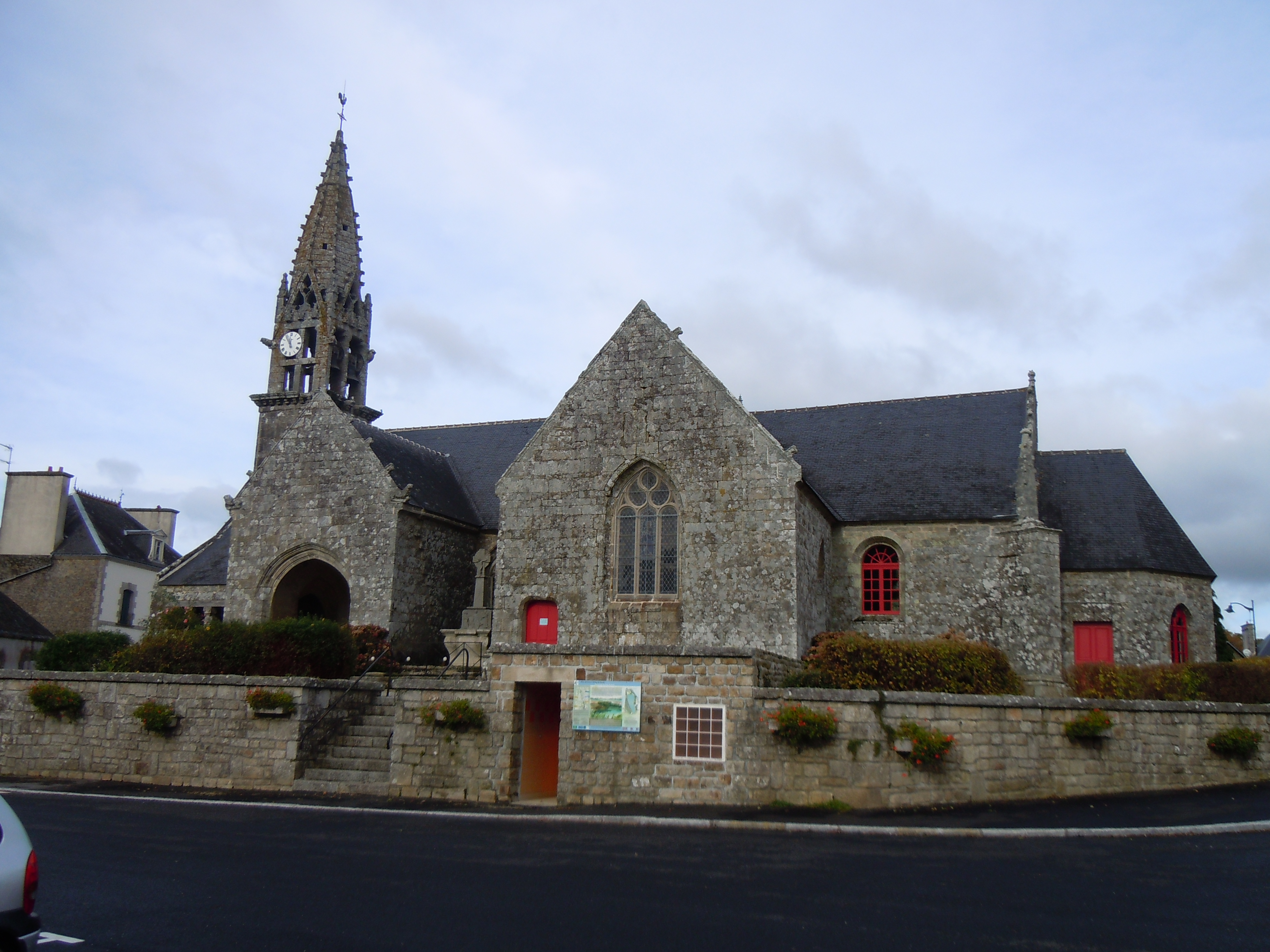
- The church of Saint-Barnabé, in Langoëlan
- Location of Langoëlan
- Location within France Location within Brittany
- Coordinates: 48°07′19″N 3°13′59″W
- Country: France
- Region: Brittany
- Department: Morbihan
- Arrondissement: Pontivy
- Canton: Gourin
- Intercommunality: Roi Morvan Communauté

Government
  - Mayor (2026–32): Fabrice Raud
- Area^{1}: 22.27 km^{2} (8.60 sq mi)
- Highest elevation: 274 m (899 ft)
- Lowest elevation: 137 m (449 ft)
- Population (2023): 403
  - Density: 18.1/km^{2} (46.9/sq mi)
- Time zone: UTC+01:00 (CET)
  - Summer (DST): UTC+02:00 (CEST)
- INSEE/Postal code: 56099 /56160
- ^{1} French Land Register data, which excludes lakes, ponds, glaciers > 1 km^{2} (0.386 sq mi or 247 acres) and river estuaries.

Langoëlan (French pronunciation: [lɑ̃ɡwɛlɑ̃]; Breton: Laoulan) is a commune in the Morbihan department of Brittany in north-western France. Inhabitants of Langoëlan are called in French Langoëlanais.

== Geography ==
Langoëlan is located in the northwestern part of Morbihan. Historically, it belongs to Vannetais and Pays Pourlet. Langoëlan is border by Mellionnec and Lescouët-Gouarec to the north, by Silfiac and Séglien to the east, by Locmalo to the south and by Ploërdut to the west. The river Scorff flows through the commune. The wood of Coet Codu is in the northern part of the commune.

== Map ==
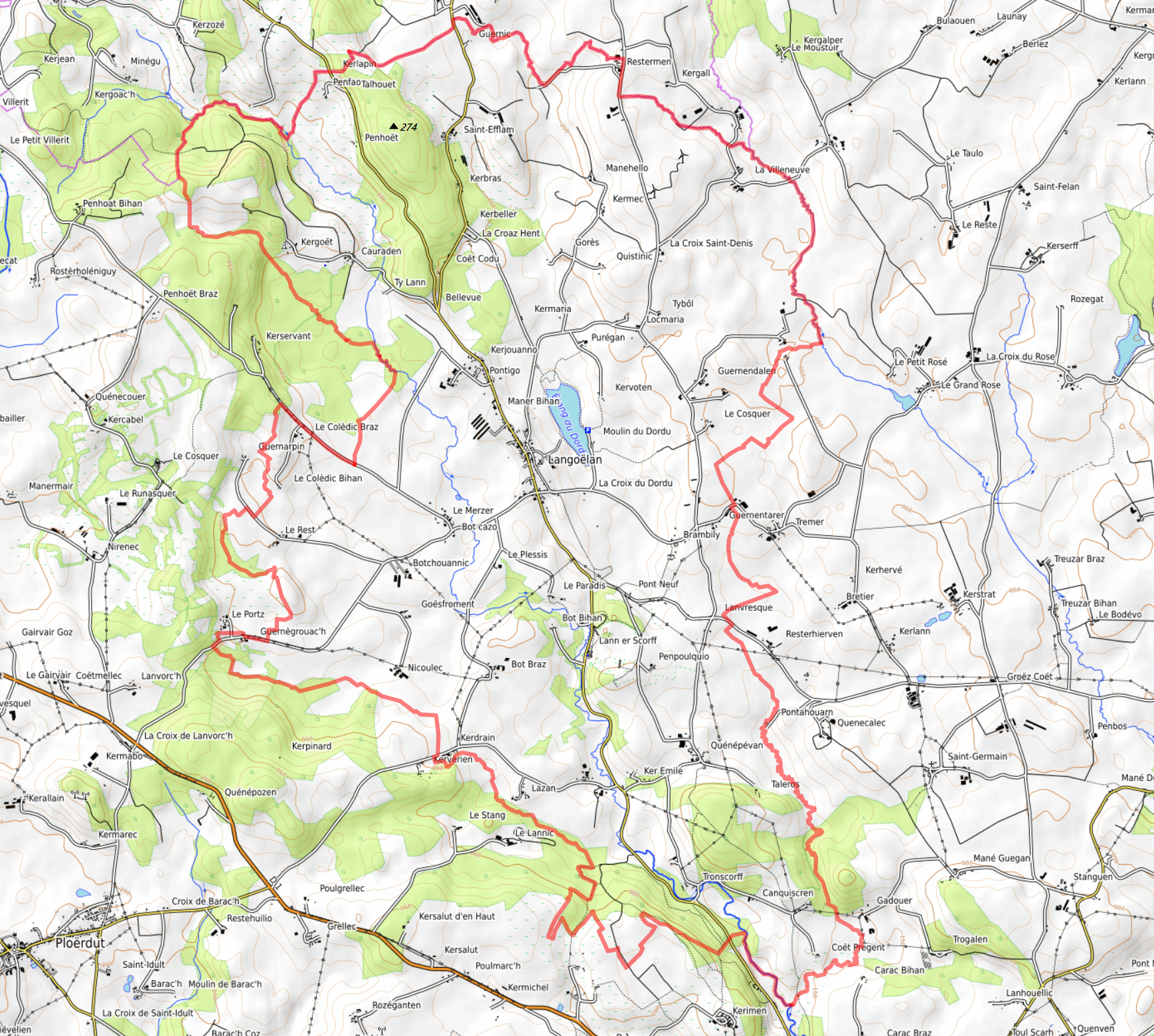
Topographic map

== List of places ==
- Bellevue
- Bot Bihan (le)
- Bot Bras (le)
- Bot Cazo
- Botchouannic
- Brambily
- Canquiscren
- Caureden (chapel)
- Coët Codu
- Coët Prégent
- Coledic Bihan
- Coledic Bras
- Cosquer (le)
- Croix de Locmaria (le)
- Croix du Dordu (la)
- Croix Hent (la)
- Croix St Denis (la)
- Dordu
- Goesfroment
- Goézélégan
- Gorès
- Guernandalen
- Guernandalen d'en Haut
- Guernentarer
- Guernevel
- Guernic
- Guernogroah
- Huiteau
- Ker Mon Désir
- Keralice
- Kerbeller
- Kerbras
- Kerdavid
- Kerdrain
- Kerémile
- Kergoët
- Kergraouahic
- Kerjouanno
- Kerlapin
- Kermaria
- Kermec
- Kervoten
- Langoëlan (Bourg)
- Lann er Scorff
- Lanvresque
- Lazan
- Lizouriet
- Locmaria
- Manéhello
- Maner Bihan
- Merzer (le)
- Moulin du Paradis
- Moulin du Quelen
- Nicoulec
- Paradis (le)
- Penfao
- Penhoët
- Pimpoulquio
- Plessis (le)
- Pont Neuf
- Pontigo
- Purégan
- Quénépévant
- Quistinic
- Reste (le)
- Restermen
- Saint Efflam
- Saint Houarno (chapel)
- Taleros
- Talhouët
- Tronscorff
- Tybol
- Tylan
- Villeneuve (la)

== Demographics ==
Historical population

Year	Pop.	±% p.a.
1793	1,316	—
1800	1,286	−0.33%
1806	1,038	−3.51%
1821	1,269	+1.35%
1831	1,313	+0.34%
1836	1,324	+0.17%
1841	1,347	+0.35%
1846	1,484	+1.96%
1851	1,391	−1.29%
1856	1,322	−1.01%
1861	1,242	−1.24%
1866	1,321	+1.24%
1872	1,212	−1.43%
1876	1,242	+0.61%
1881	1,281	+0.62%
1886	1,332	+0.78%
1891	1,295	−0.56%
1896	1,364	+1.04%
1901	1,354	−0.15%

Year	Pop.	±% p.a.
1906	1,384	+0.44%
1911	1,276	−1.61%
1921	1,238	−0.30%
1926	1,227	−0.18%
1931	1,242	+0.24%
1936	1,178	−1.05%
1946	1,090	−0.77%
1954	945	−1.77%
1962	907	−0.51%
1968	812	−1.83%
1975	659	−2.94%
1982	575	−1.93%
1990	429	−3.60%
1999	369	−1.66%
2007	408	+1.26%
2012	401	−0.35%
2017	380	−1.07%
2023	403	+0.98%

Source: EHESS and INSEE (1968-2023)

== History ==
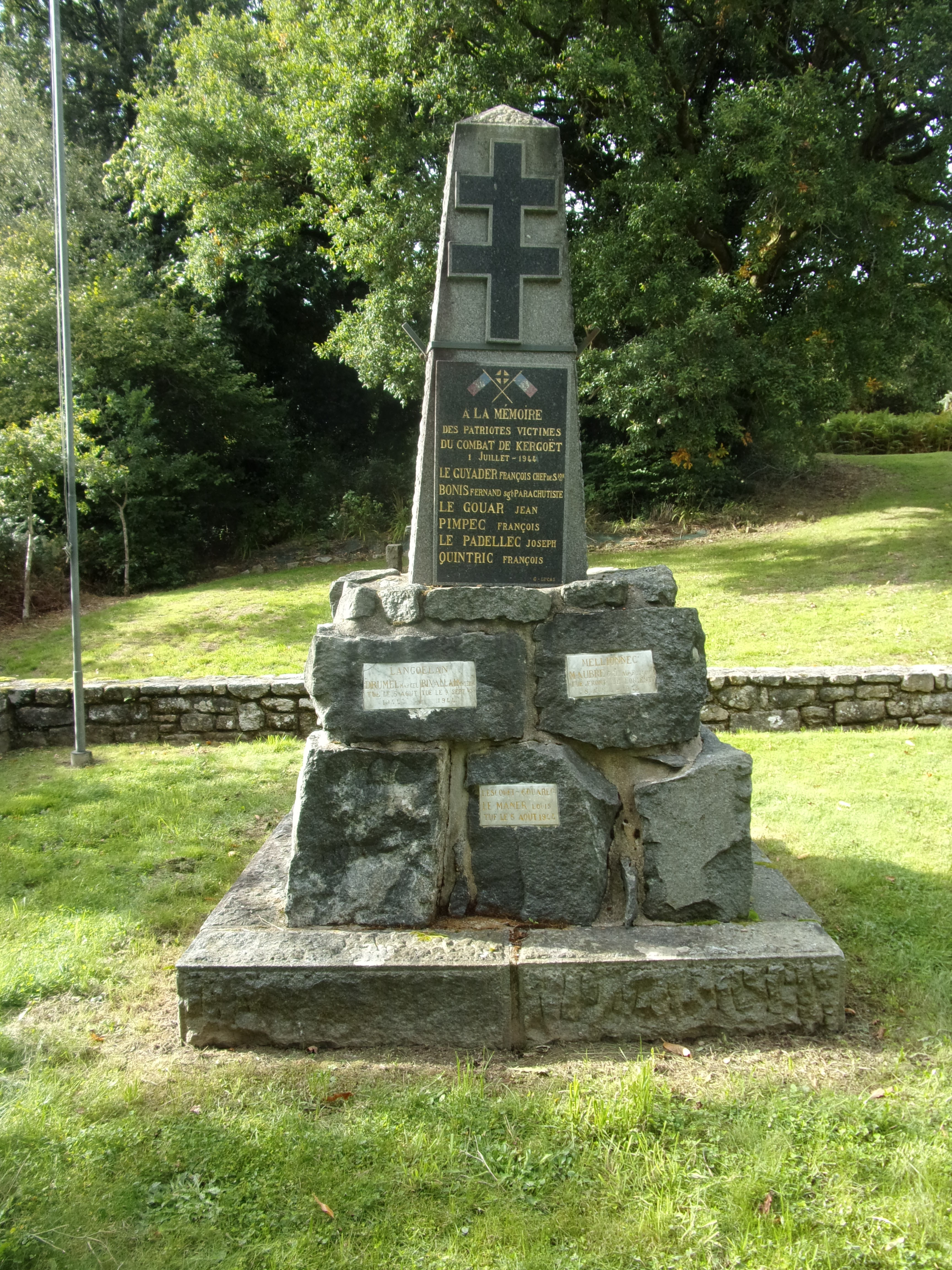
Monument erected in memory of the French victims of the Kergoët battle.

The battle of Kergoët took place on 1 July 1944 in Langoëlan. About thirty five German soldiers were killed in the fight. A monument was erected in memory of the French victims of the Kergoët battle. Some French victims were tortured by the Germans. A farmer, Joseph Le Padellec, were savagely beaten by the Germans and shot dead.

== See also ==
- Communes of the Morbihan department
