= Cléguérec =

Commune in Brittany, France

Cléguérec Klegereg
- Commune
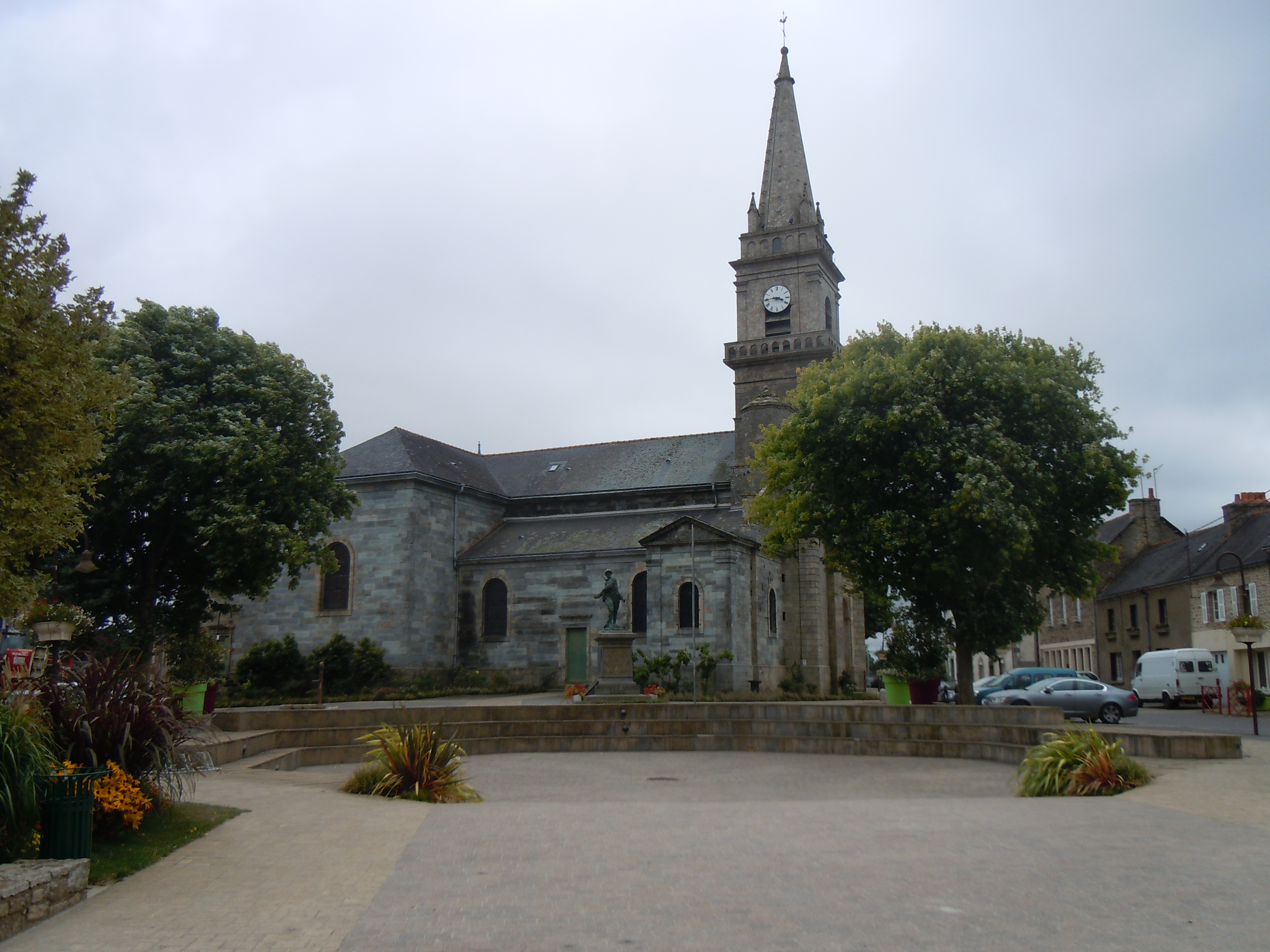
- The parish church Saint Guérec.

- Coat of arms
- Location of Cléguérec
- Location within France Location within Brittany
- Coordinates: 48°07′30″N 3°04′10″W
- Country: France
- Region: Brittany
- Department: Morbihan
- Arrondissement: Pontivy
- Canton: Gourin
- Intercommunality: Pontivy Communauté

Government
  - Mayor (2026–32): Maryvonne Le Forestier
- Area^{1}: 62.99 km^{2} (24.32 sq mi)
- Highest elevation: 281 m (922 ft)
- Lowest elevation: 55 m (180 ft)
- Population (2023): 2,885
  - Density: 45.80/km^{2} (118.6/sq mi)
- Time zone: UTC+01:00 (CET)
  - Summer (DST): UTC+02:00 (CEST)
- INSEE/Postal code: 56041 /56480
- ^{1} French Land Register data, which excludes lakes, ponds, glaciers > 1 km^{2} (0.386 sq mi or 247 acres) and river estuaries.

Cléguérec (French pronunciation: [kleɡeʁɛk]; Breton: Klegereg) is a commune in the Morbihan department of Brittany in north-western France.

== Geography ==
The town is located 12 km (7.5 mi) northwest of Pontivy. Cléguérec is border by Séglien and Silfiac to the west, by Sainte-Brigitte and Saint-Aignan to the north, by Neulliac to the east and by Malguénac to the south. Historically, the town belongs to Vanetais. The forest of Quénécan extends to the north of the commune. The Breuil du Chêne is the highest hill in the town. The summit is 948 feet (289 m) above sea level.

== Map ==
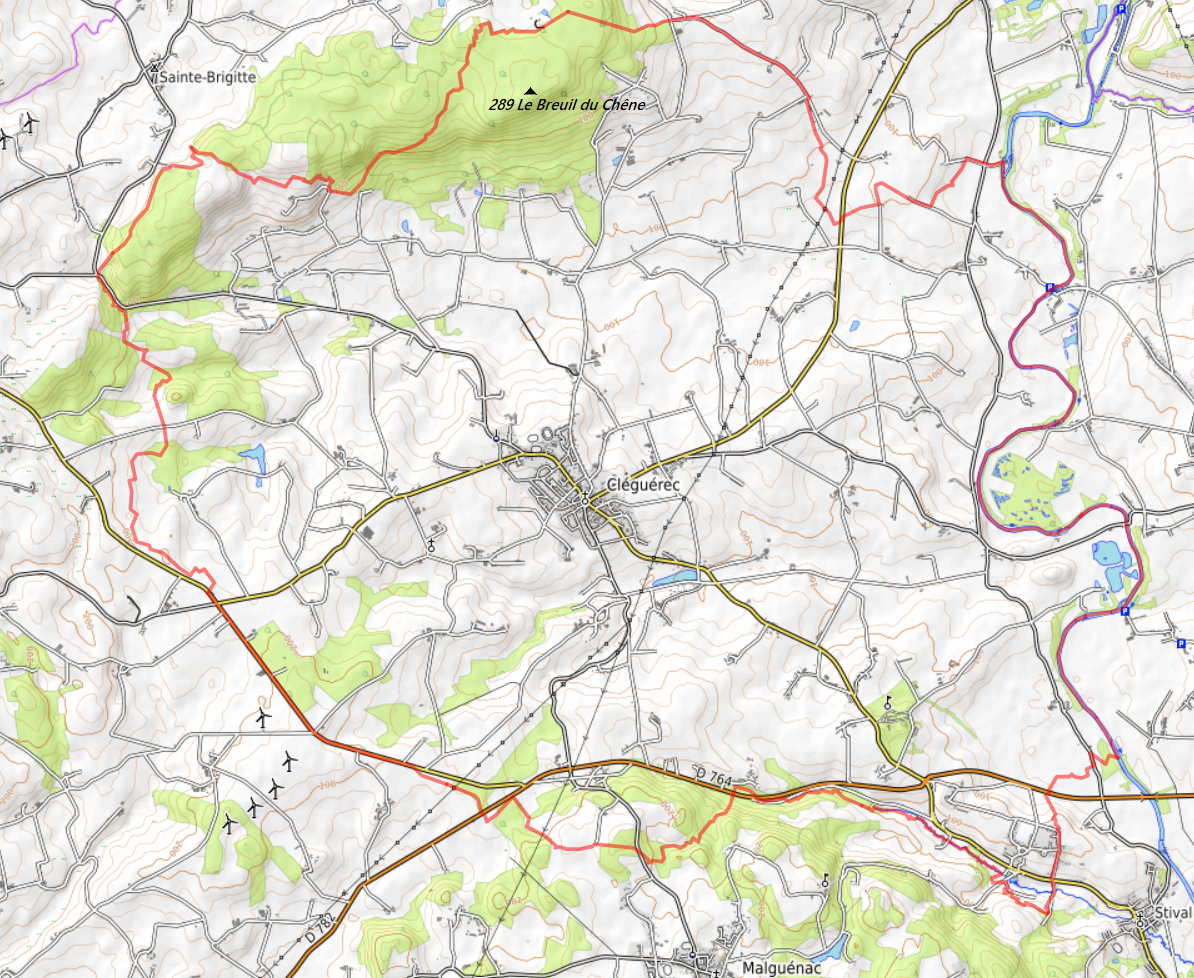
Topographic map

== Demographics ==
Inhabitants of Cléguérec are called in French Cléguérecois.

Historical population

Year	Pop.	±% p.a.
1793	3,595	—
1800	3,793	+0.77%
1806	3,303	−2.28%
1821	3,210	−0.19%
1831	3,700	+1.43%
1836	3,659	−0.22%
1841	3,434	−1.26%
1846	3,699	+1.50%
1851	3,850	+0.80%
1856	3,579	−1.45%
1861	3,442	−0.78%
1866	3,470	+0.16%
1872	3,335	−0.66%
1876	3,465	+0.96%
1881	3,360	−0.61%
1886	3,586	+1.31%
1891	3,617	+0.17%
1896	3,560	−0.32%
1901	3,608	+0.27%

Year	Pop.	±% p.a.
1906	3,633	+0.14%
1911	3,670	+0.20%
1921	3,491	−0.50%
1926	3,504	+0.07%
1931	3,423	−0.47%
1936	3,405	−0.11%
1946	3,477	+0.21%
1954	3,111	−1.38%
1962	3,013	−0.40%
1968	2,812	−1.14%
1975	2,679	−0.69%
1982	2,717	+0.20%
1990	2,716	−0.00%
1999	2,749	+0.13%
2007	2,862	+0.50%
2012	2,915	+0.37%
2017	2,906	−0.06%
2023	2,885	−0.12%

Source: EHESS and INSEE (1968-2023)

== Breton language ==
In 2008, 13,85% of children in the commune attended bilingual primary schools.

== Gallery ==
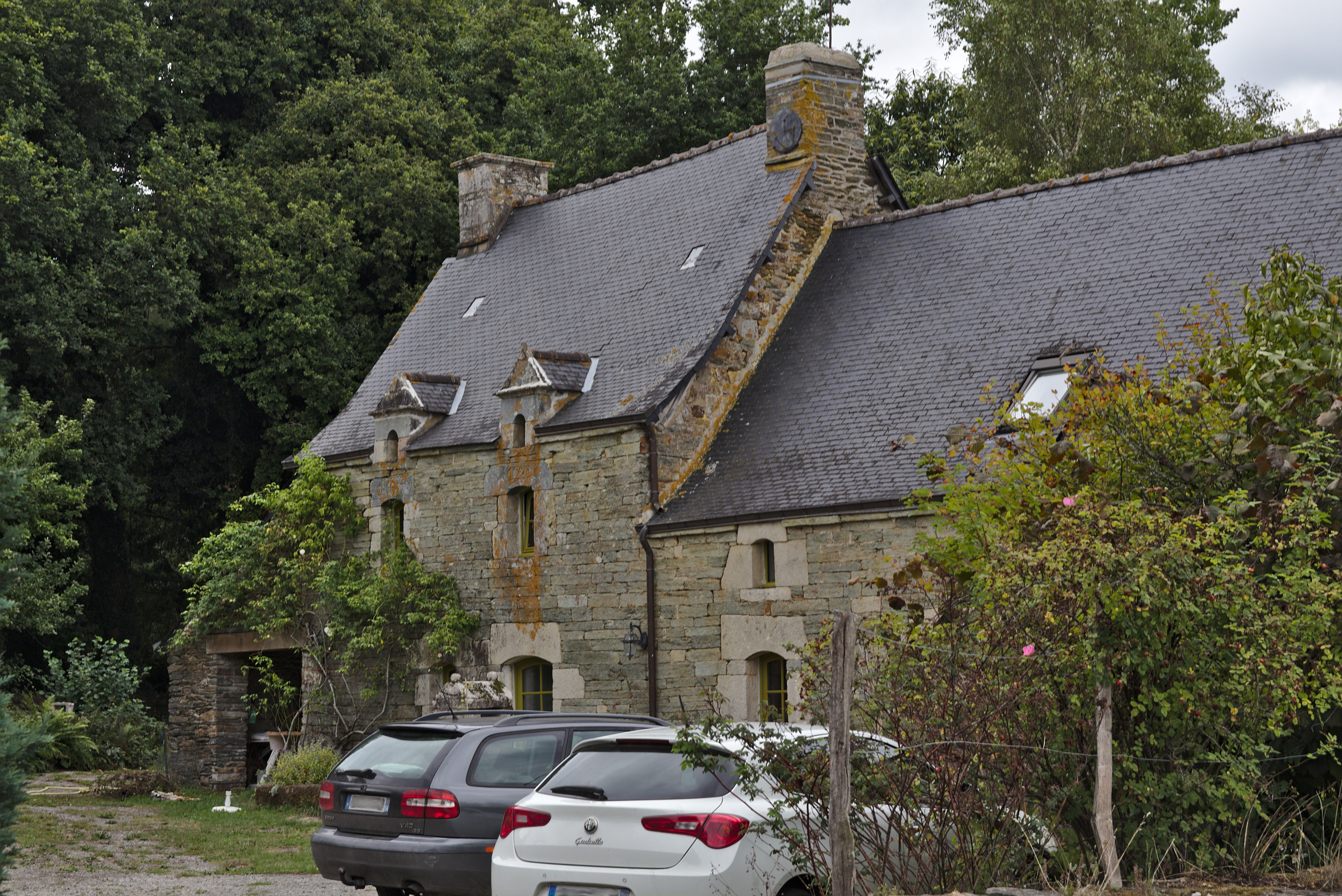
Manor of Corbello

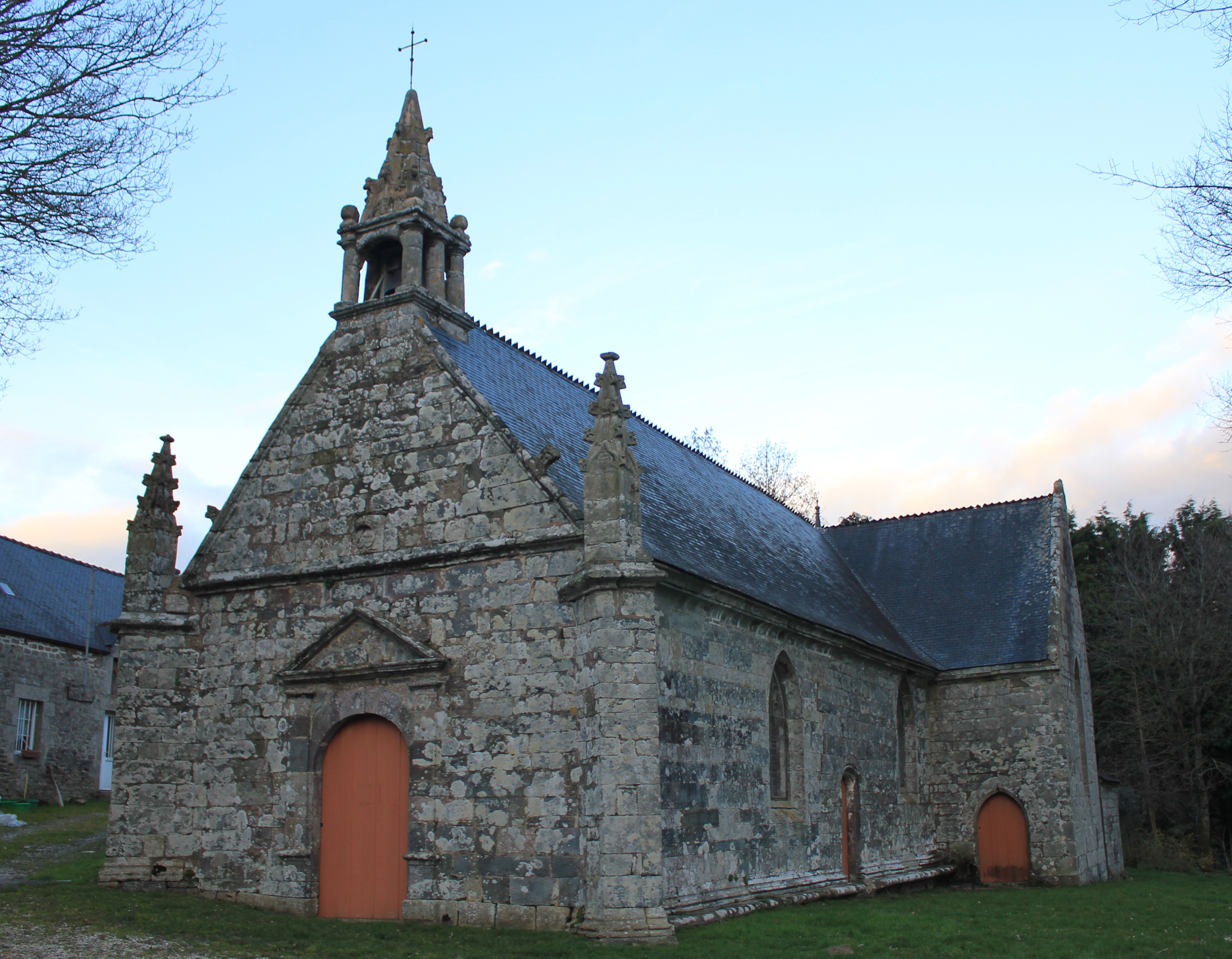
Chapel of Trinity

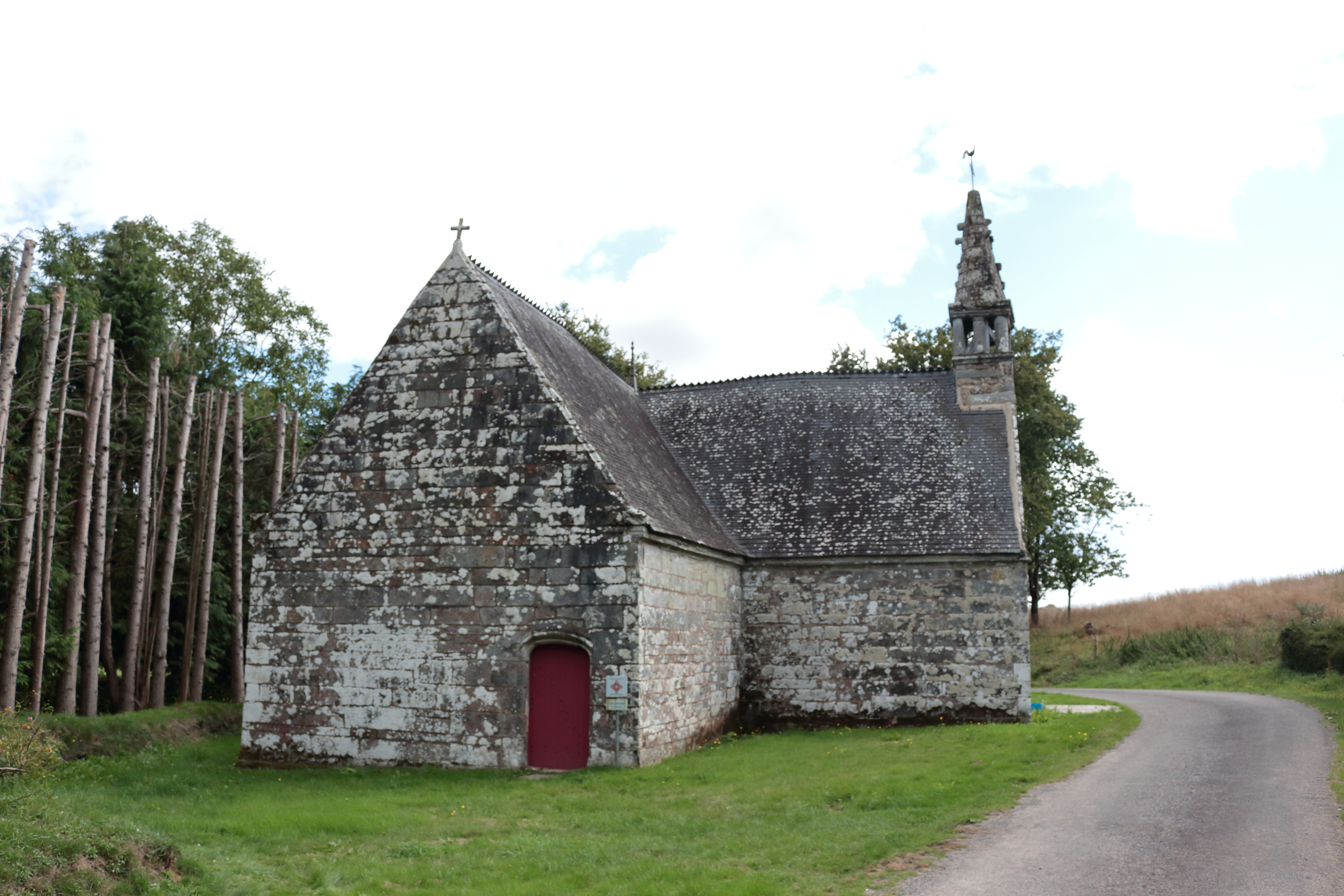
Chapel Saint-André de Langlo

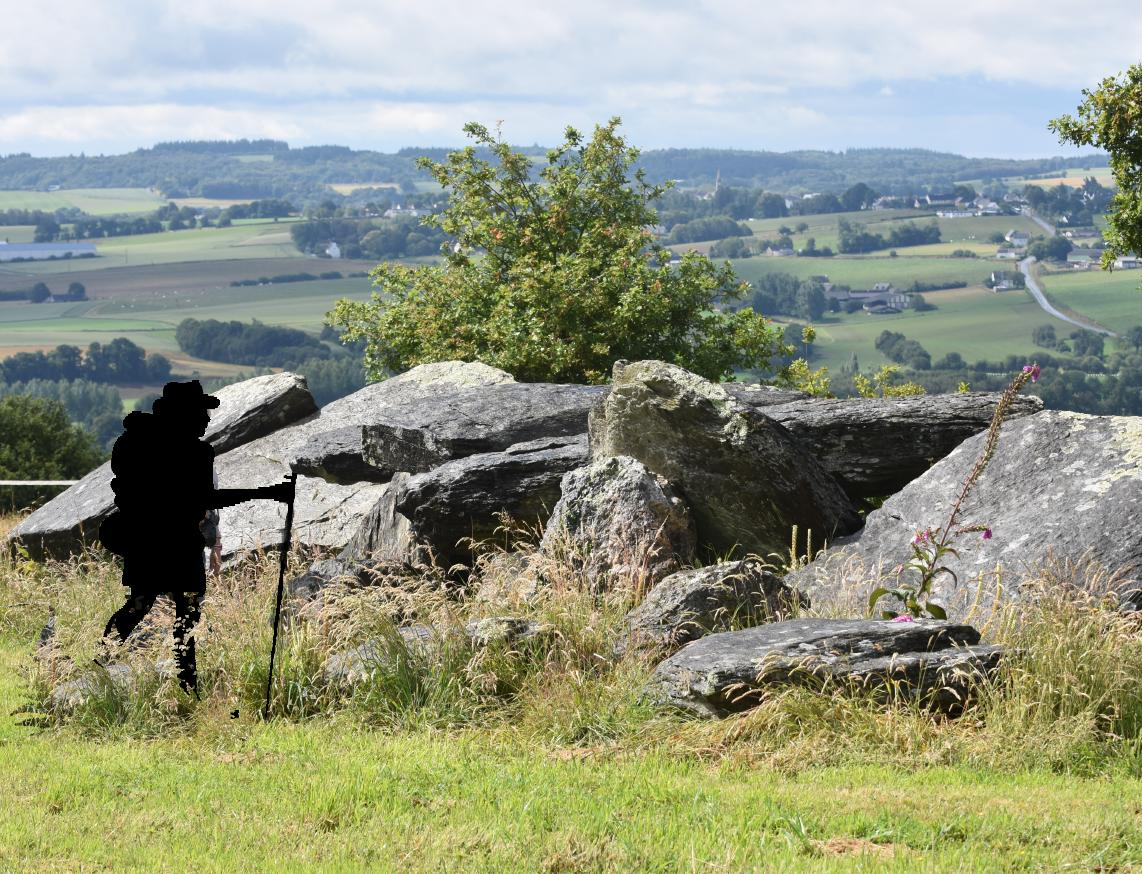
Gallery grave of Bot-er-Mohed

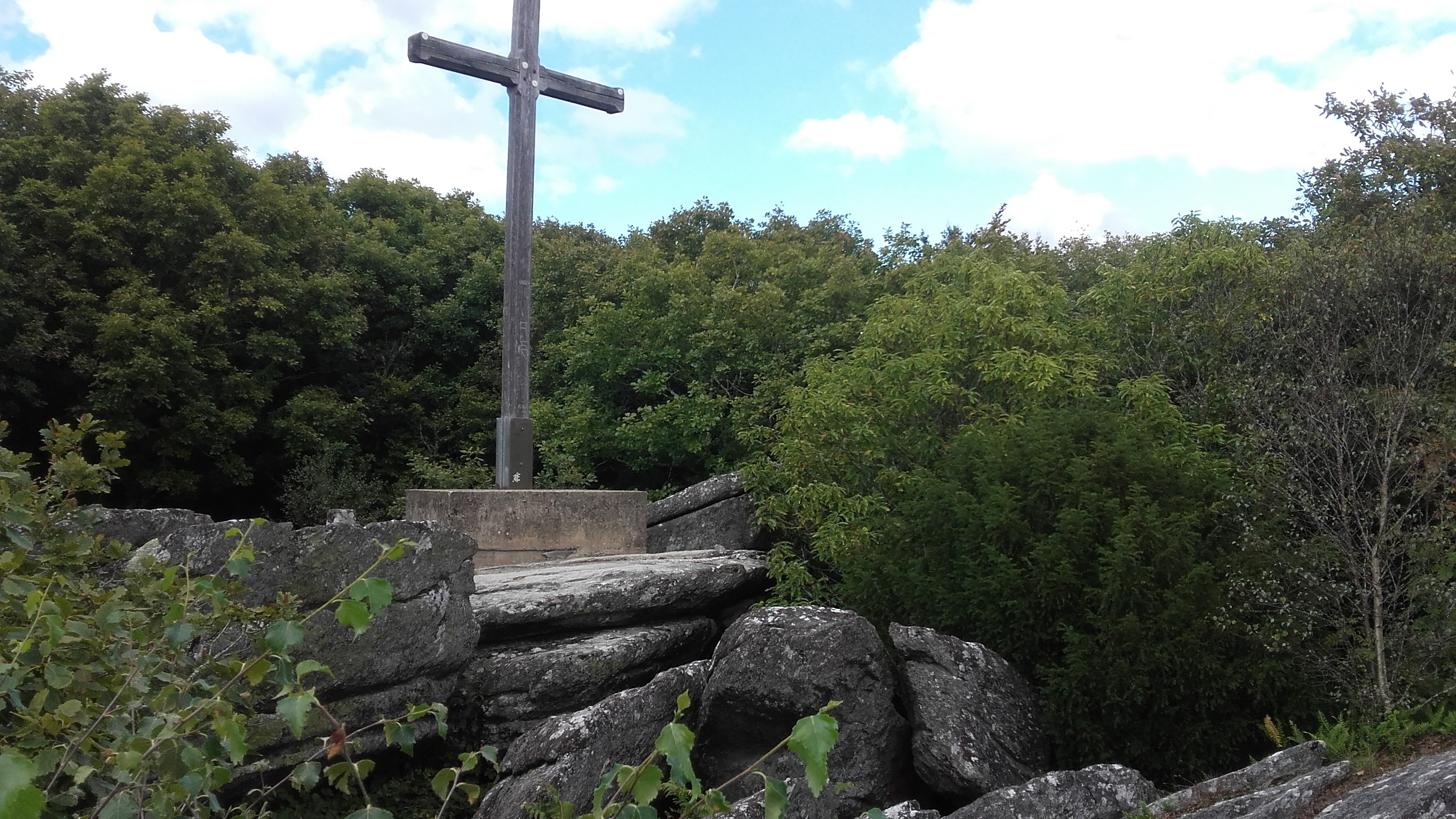
Calvary on the top of Breuil du Chêne

== See also ==
- Communes of the Morbihan department
- Gaston-Auguste Schweitzer Sculptor of Cléguérec war memorial
