= Silfiac =

Silfiac Silieg
- Commune
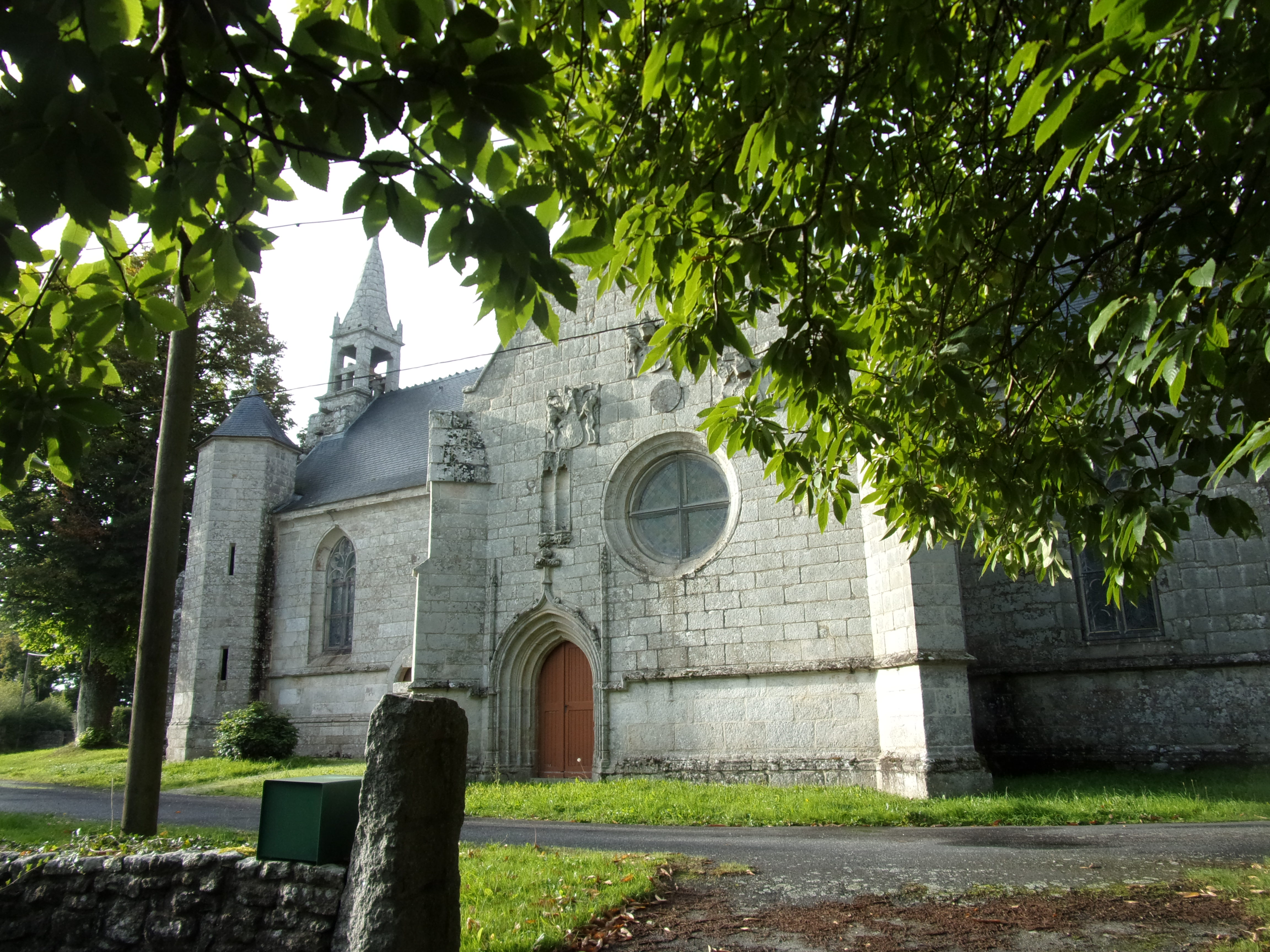
- The Chapel of Saint-Laurent, in Silfiac
- Location of Silfiac
- Location within France Location within Brittany
- Coordinates: 48°08′59″N 3°09′20″W
- Country: France
- Region: Brittany
- Department: Morbihan
- Arrondissement: Pontivy
- Canton: Gourin
- Intercommunality: Pontivy Communauté

Government
  - Mayor (2026–32): Olivier Constant
- Area^{1}: 22.46 km^{2} (8.67 sq mi)
- Highest elevation: 276 m (906 ft)
- Lowest elevation: 175 m (574 ft)
- Population (2023): 491
  - Density: 21.9/km^{2} (56.6/sq mi)
- Time zone: UTC+01:00 (CET)
  - Summer (DST): UTC+02:00 (CEST)
- INSEE/Postal code: 56245 /56480
- ^{1} French Land Register data, which excludes lakes, ponds, glaciers > 1 km^{2} (0.386 sq mi or 247 acres) and river estuaries.

Silfiac (French pronunciation: [silfjak]; Breton: Silieg) is a commune in the Morbihan department of Brittany in north-western France.

== Geography ==
The village centre of Silfiac is the highest in the department of Morbihan. It is 270 meters above sea level. Silfiac is border by Séglien to the south, by Cléguérec and Sainte-Brigitte to the east, by Lescouët-Gouarec and Perret to the north and by Langoëlan to the west.

== Map ==
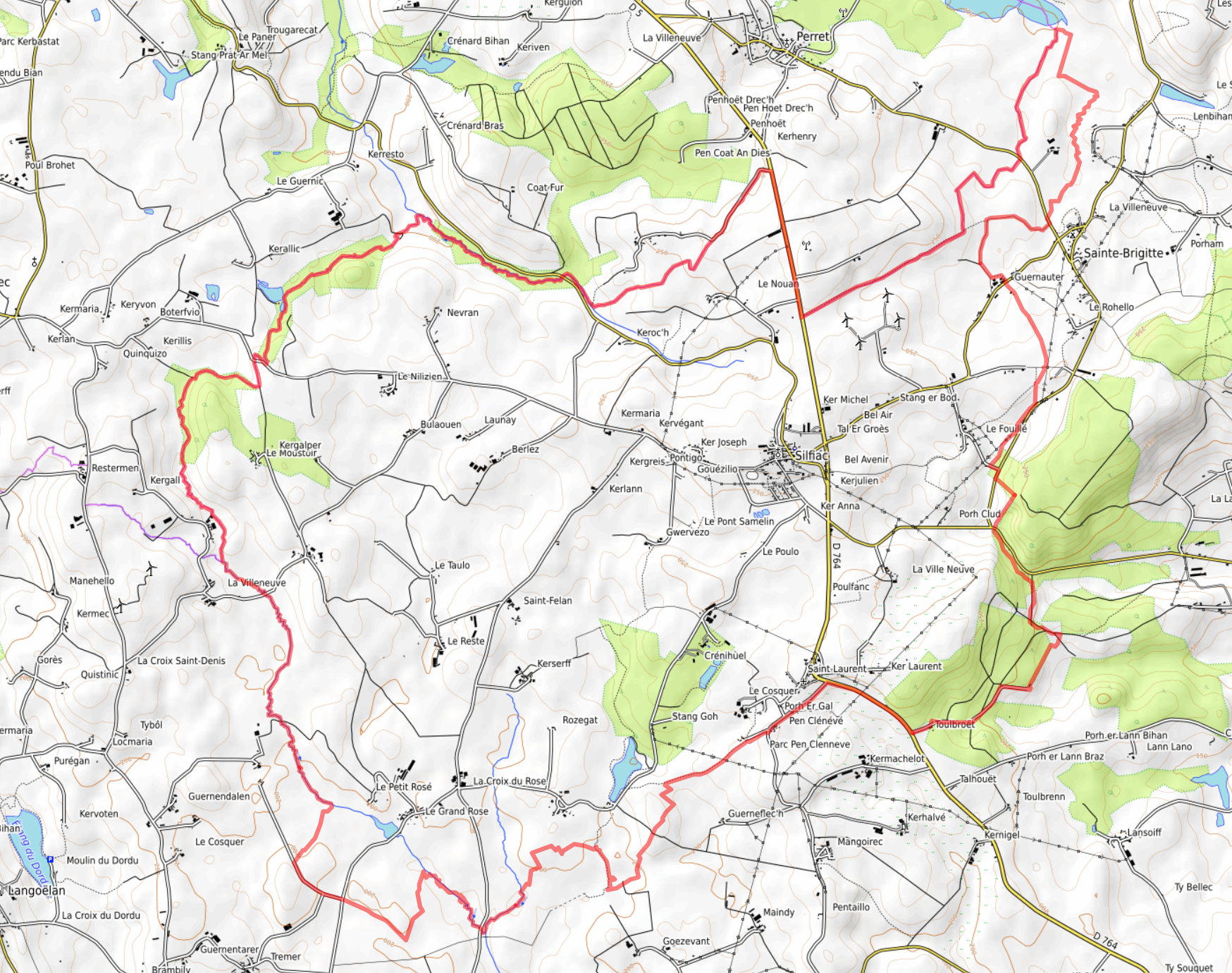
Topographic map

== Population ==
Inhabitants of Silfiac are called in French Silfiacois.

Historical population

Year	Pop.	±% p.a.
1793	672	—
1800	732	+1.23%
1806	913	+3.75%
1821	746	−1.34%
1831	1,004	+3.01%
1836	1,022	+0.36%
1841	977	−0.90%
1846	1,183	+3.90%
1851	1,150	−0.56%
1856	1,002	−2.72%
1861	959	−0.87%
1866	1,008	+1.00%
1872	886	−2.13%
1876	946	+1.65%
1881	934	−0.25%
1886	952	+0.38%
1891	1,014	+1.27%
1896	1,017	+0.06%
1901	1,082	+1.25%

Year	Pop.	±% p.a.
1906	1,152	+1.26%
1911	1,180	+0.48%
1921	1,209	+0.24%
1926	1,157	−0.88%
1931	1,019	−2.51%
1936	994	−0.50%
1946	956	−0.39%
1954	897	−0.79%
1962	781	−1.72%
1968	683	−2.21%
1975	588	−2.12%
1982	526	−1.58%
1990	459	−1.69%
1999	445	−0.34%
2007	459	+0.39%
2012	459	+0.00%
2017	434	−1.11%
2023	491	+2.08%

Source: EHESS and INSEE (1968–2023)

== Prehistory ==
A six meters high standing stone called Quenouille du Diable (devil's distaff) rises in the town. It is one of the most imposing menhirs in Brittany.

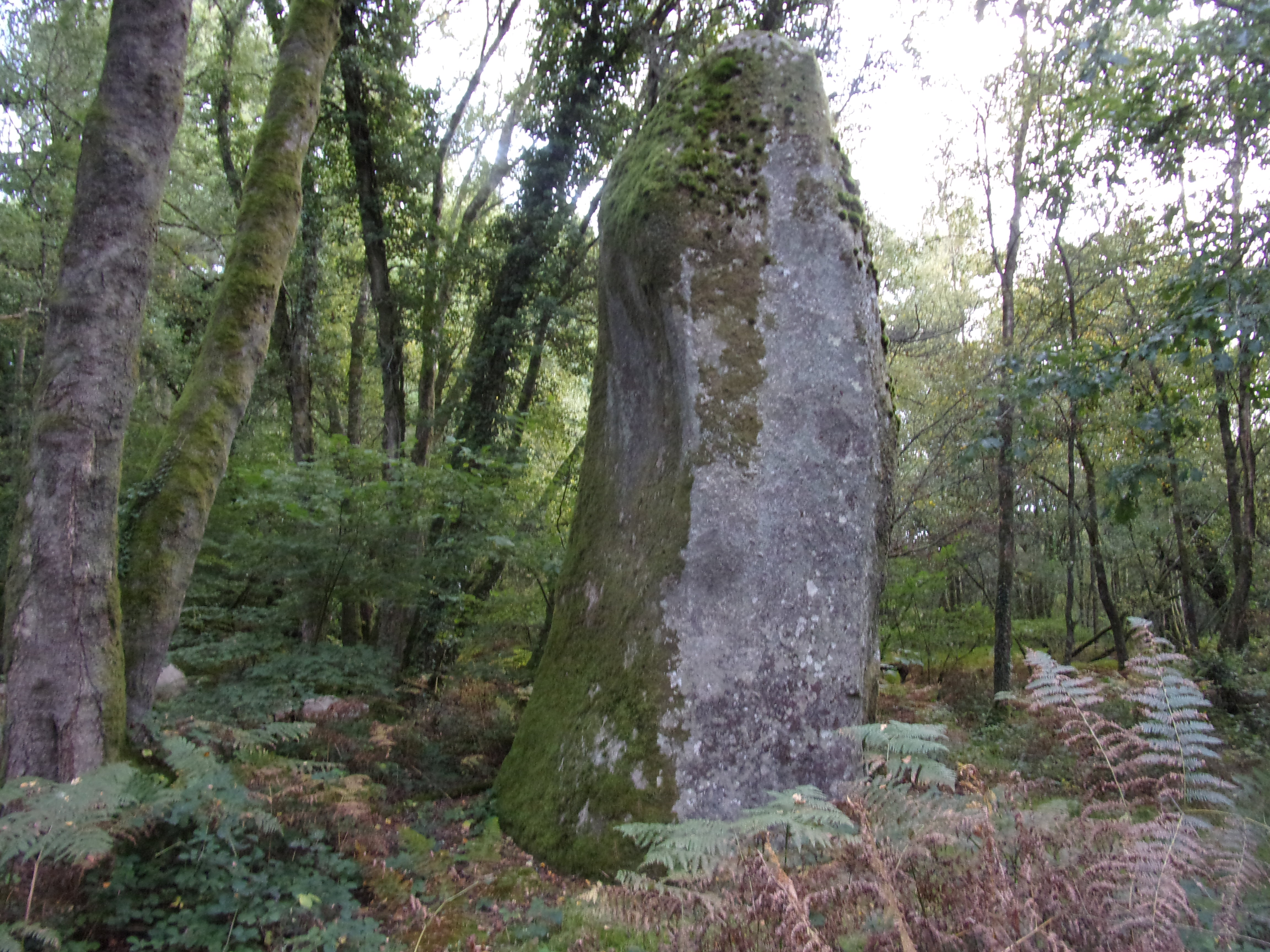
Standing stone called Quenouille du Diable.

== History ==
The Rohans and the Fravals were the main lords of the parish. Their coats of arms are visible on the south wall of the Saint-Laurent chapel. The Fraval owned the manor of Crenihuel, in Silfiac.

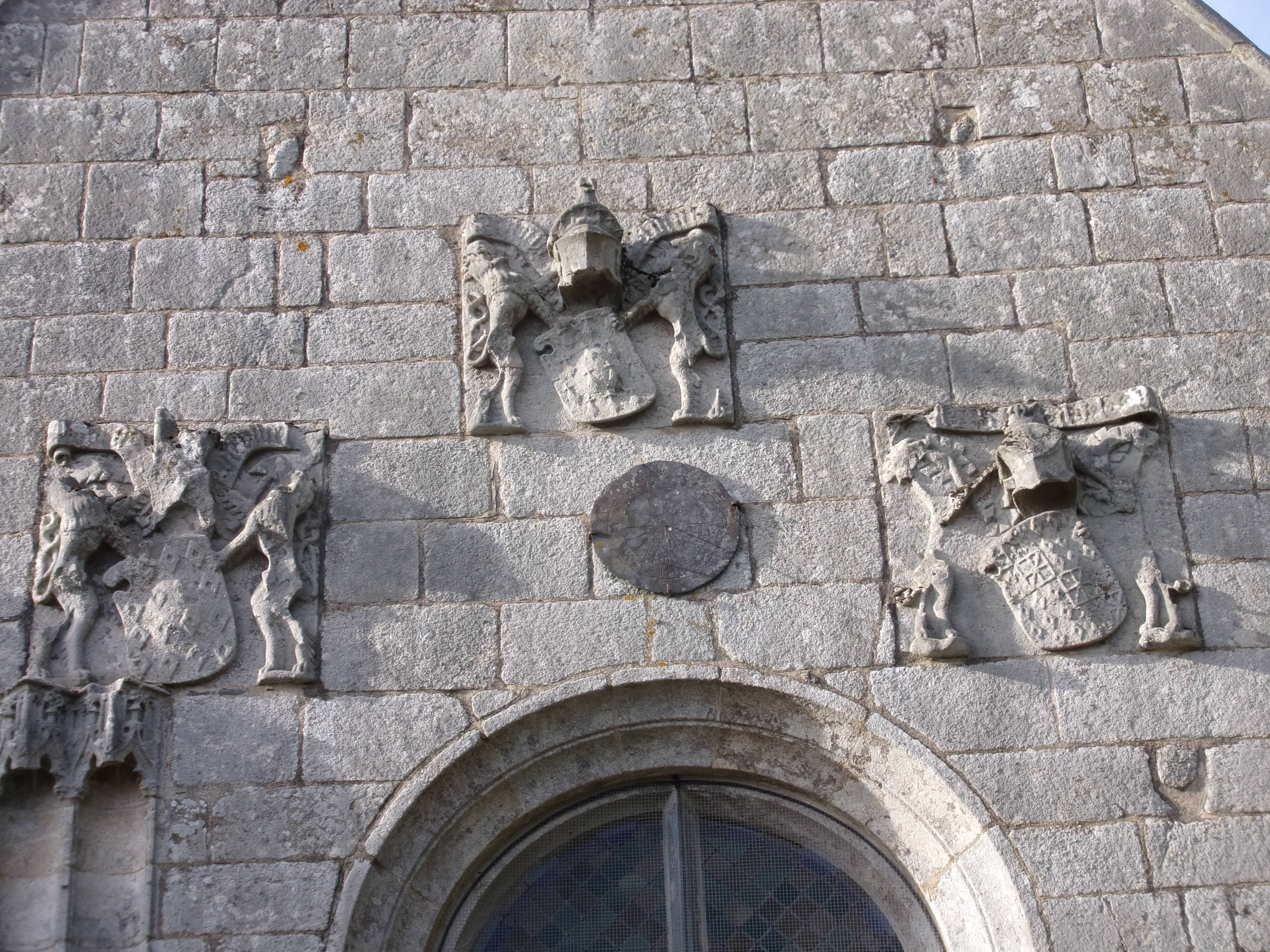
Coat of arms of Rohan and Fraval (Saint Laurent chapel).

== See also ==
- Communes of the Morbihan department
- Gaston-Auguste Schweitzer Sculptor Silfiac war memorial
