= Noyal-Pontivy =

Noyal-Pontivy Noal-Pondi
- Commune
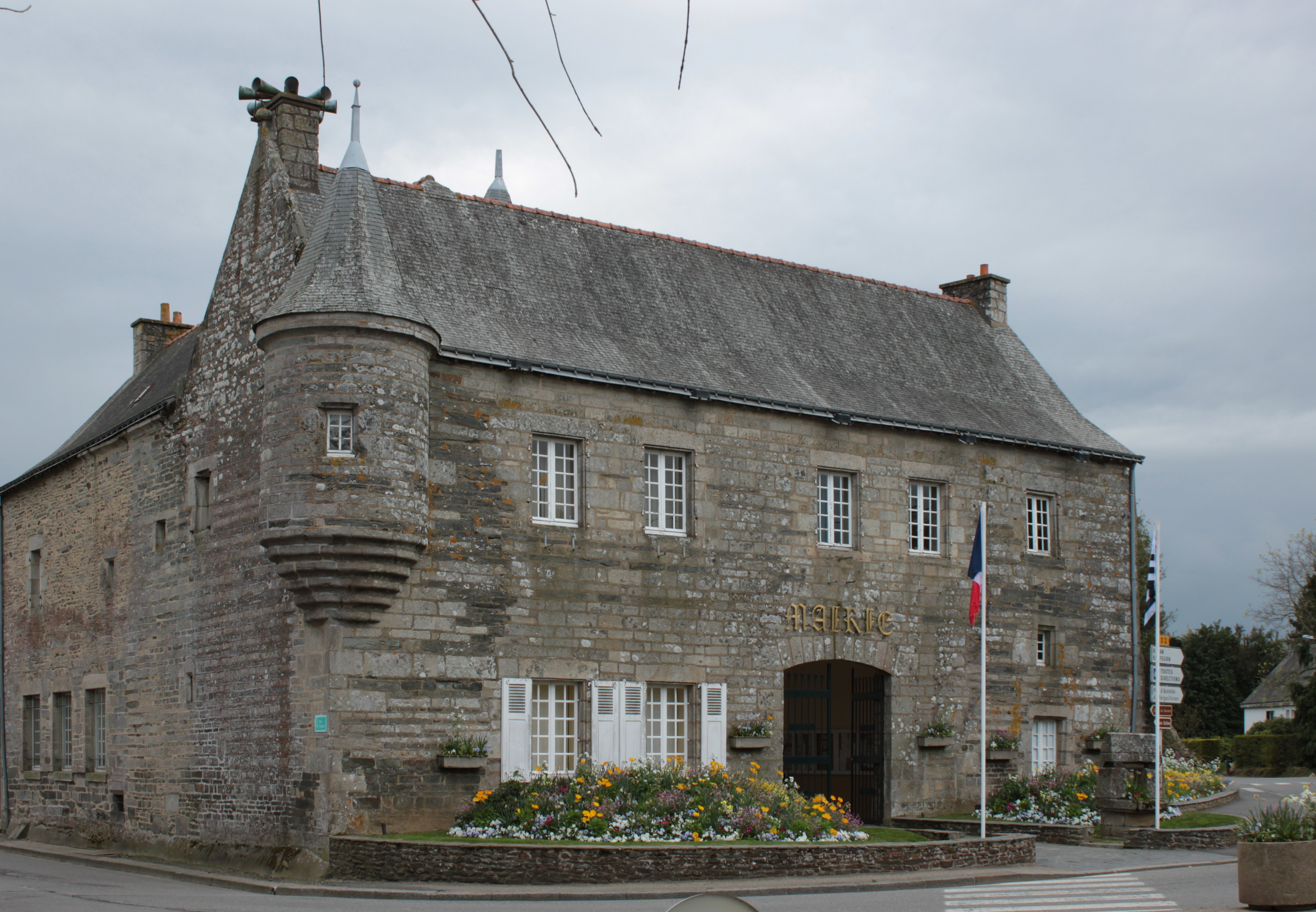
- The town hall in Noyal-Pontivy

- Coat of arms
- Location of Noyal-Pontivy
- Location within France Location within Brittany
- Coordinates: 48°04′03″N 2°52′51″W
- Country: France
- Region: Brittany
- Department: Morbihan
- Arrondissement: Pontivy
- Canton: Pontivy
- Intercommunality: Pontivy Communauté

Government
  - Mayor (2026–32): Lionel Ropert
- Area^{1}: 53.45 km^{2} (20.64 sq mi)
- Highest elevation: 162 m (531 ft)
- Lowest elevation: 54 m (177 ft)
- Population (2023): 3,606
  - Density: 67.46/km^{2} (174.7/sq mi)
- Time zone: UTC+01:00 (CET)
  - Summer (DST): UTC+02:00 (CEST)
- INSEE/Postal code: 56151 /56920
- ^{1} French Land Register data, which excludes lakes, ponds, glaciers > 1 km^{2} (0.386 sq mi or 247 acres) and river estuaries.

Noyal-Pontivy (French pronunciation: [nwajal pɔ̃tivi]; Breton: Noal-Pondi) is a commune in the Morbihan department of Brittany in north-western France.

== Population ==
Historical population
Year	Pop.	±% p.a.
1968	2,458	—
1975	2,731	+1.52%
1982	3,066	+1.67%
1990	3,155	+0.36%
1999	3,285	+0.45%
2007	3,598	+1.14%
2012	3,693	+0.52%
2017	3,639	−0.29%
2023	3,606	−0.15%
Source: INSEE

Inhabitants of Noyal-Pontivy are called in French Noyalais.

== Breton language ==
The municipality launched a linguistic plan through Ya d'ar brezhoneg on 19 September 2005.

== See also ==
- Communes of the Morbihan department
- Gaston-Auguste Schweitzer Sculptor of Noyal-Pontivy war memorial
