= Séglien =

Séglien Seglian
- Commune
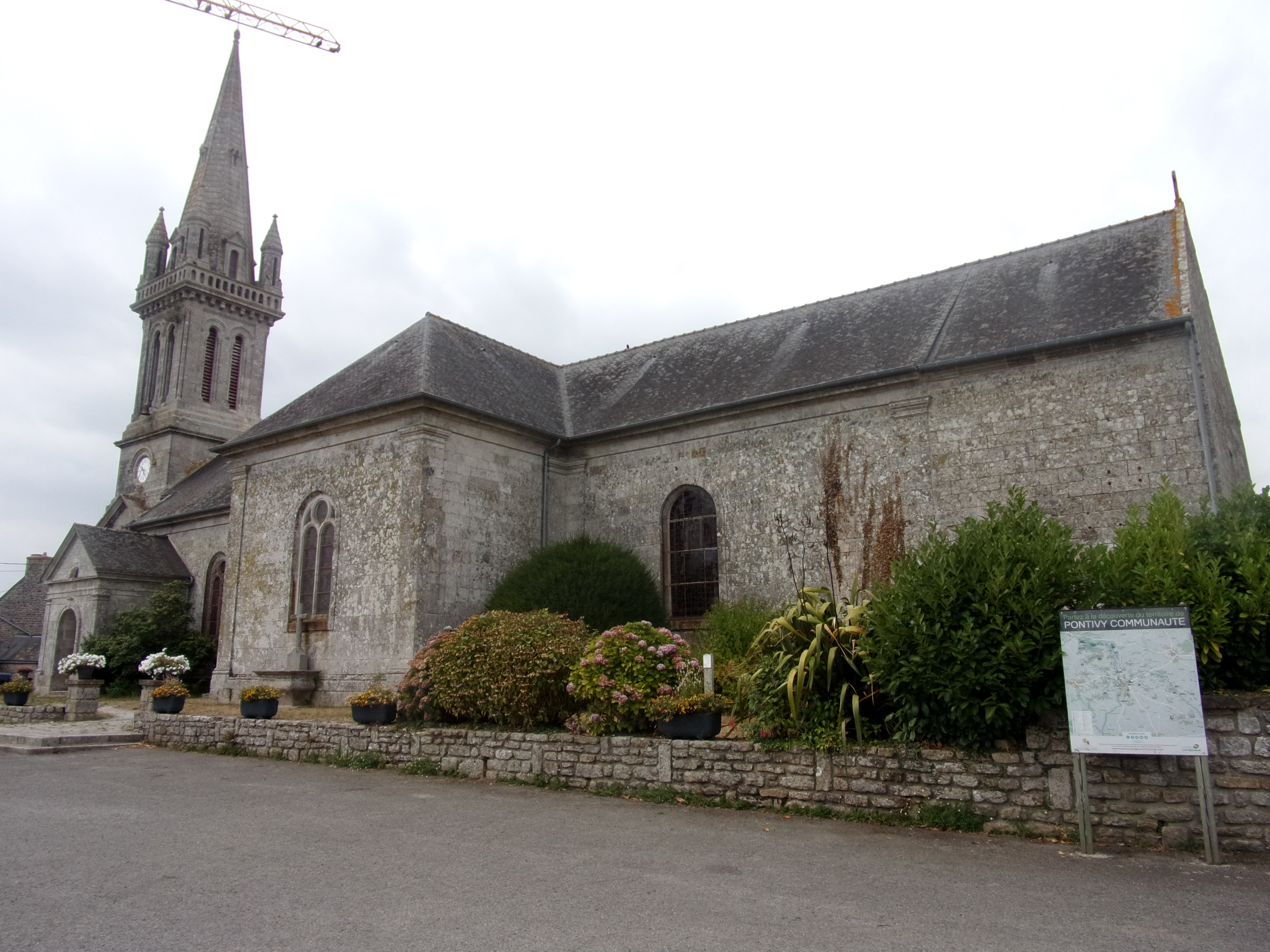
- The parish church in Séglien
- Location of Séglien
- Location within France Location within Brittany
- Coordinates: 48°06′28″N 3°09′30″W
- Country: France
- Region: Brittany
- Department: Morbihan
- Arrondissement: Pontivy
- Canton: Gourin
- Intercommunality: Pontivy Communauté

Government
  - Mayor (2026–32): Laurent Ganivet
- Area^{1}: 38.36 km^{2} (14.81 sq mi)
- Highest elevation: 248 m (814 ft)
- Lowest elevation: 123 m (404 ft)
- Population (2023): 673
  - Density: 17.5/km^{2} (45.4/sq mi)
- Time zone: UTC+01:00 (CET)
  - Summer (DST): UTC+02:00 (CEST)
- INSEE/Postal code: 56242 /56160
- ^{1} French Land Register data, which excludes lakes, ponds, glaciers > 1 km^{2} (0.386 sq mi or 247 acres) and river estuaries.

Séglien (French pronunciation: [seɡlijɛ̃]; Breton: Seglian) is a commune in the Morbihan department of Brittany in north-western France.

== Demographics ==
Inhabitants of Séglien are called in French Ségliennais.

Historical population

Year	Pop.	±% p.a.
1793	1,976	—
1800	1,953	−0.17%
1806	2,004	+0.43%
1821	1,876	−0.44%
1831	2,054	+0.91%
1836	2,122	+0.65%
1841	2,071	−0.49%
1846	2,230	+1.49%
1851	2,175	−0.50%
1856	2,010	−1.57%
1861	1,957	−0.53%
1866	1,980	+0.23%
1872	1,867	−0.97%
1876	1,973	+1.39%
1881	1,951	−0.22%
1886	2,014	+0.64%
1891	1,978	−0.36%
1896	2,005	+0.27%
1901	2,077	+0.71%

Year	Pop.	±% p.a.
1906	2,103	+0.25%
1911	2,090	−0.12%
1921	1,981	−0.53%
1926	1,862	−1.23%
1931	1,861	−0.01%
1936	1,791	−0.76%
1946	1,760	−0.17%
1954	1,413	−2.71%
1962	1,299	−1.05%
1968	1,115	−2.51%
1975	902	−2.98%
1982	804	−1.63%
1990	724	−1.30%
1999	709	−0.23%
2007	715	+0.11%
2012	707	−0.22%
2017	669	−1.10%
2023	673	+0.10%

Source: EHESS and INSEE (1968-2023)

== Geography ==
Séglien is border by Silfiac to the north, by Langoëlan to the west, by Locmalo and Guern to the south and by Malguénac and Cléguérec to the east. Historically, Séglien belongs to Vannetais. The river Sarre, a tributary of the river Blavet, flows through the commune.

== Map ==
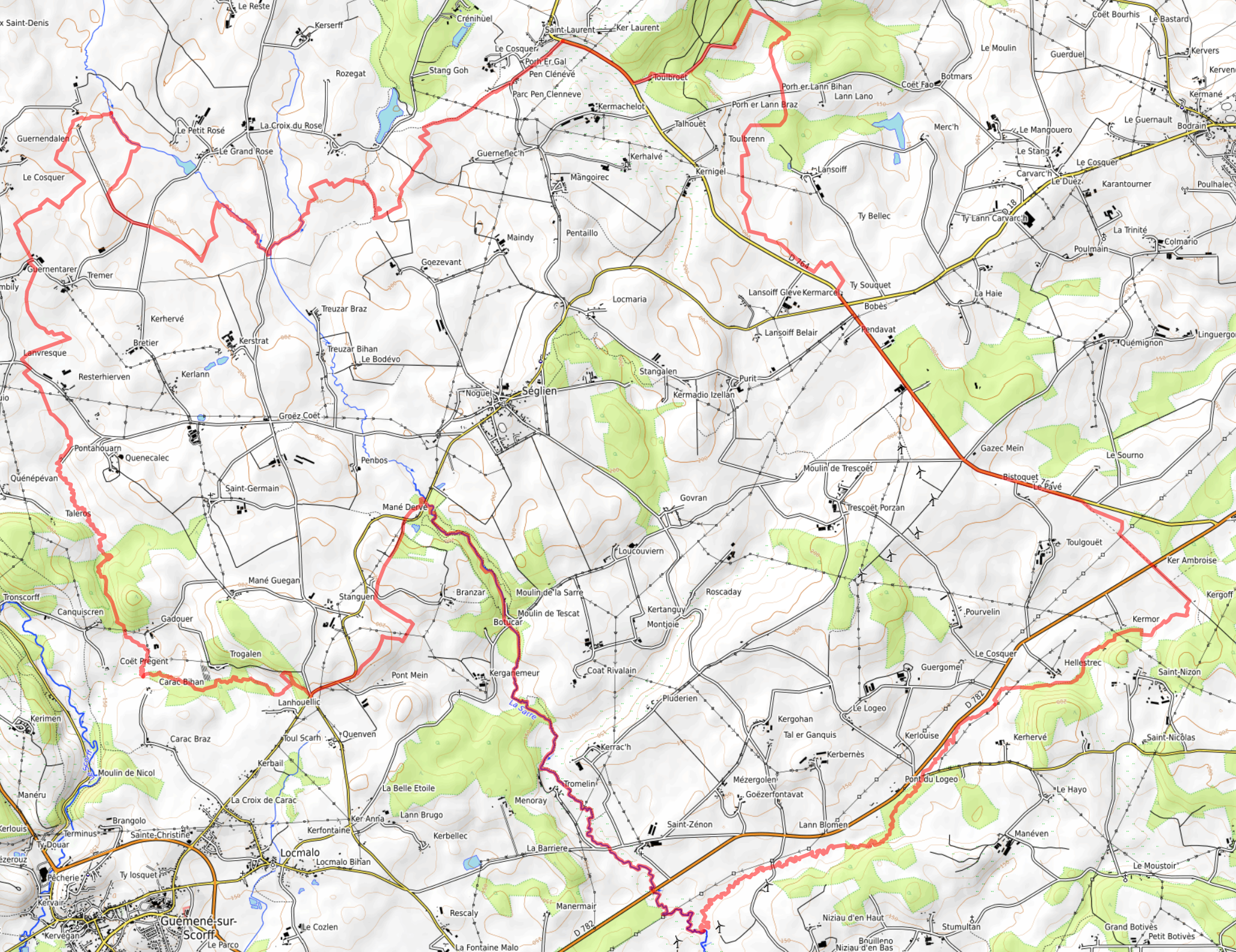
Topographic map

== History ==
From the Roman period there remains a section of the Roman road connecting Castennec to Carhaix, passing through Mané-Guégan, Quénécalec and Resterhierven. On this road, not far from Saint-Germain, there is a mutilated cylindrical stone, which could have been a milestone.

== Gallery ==
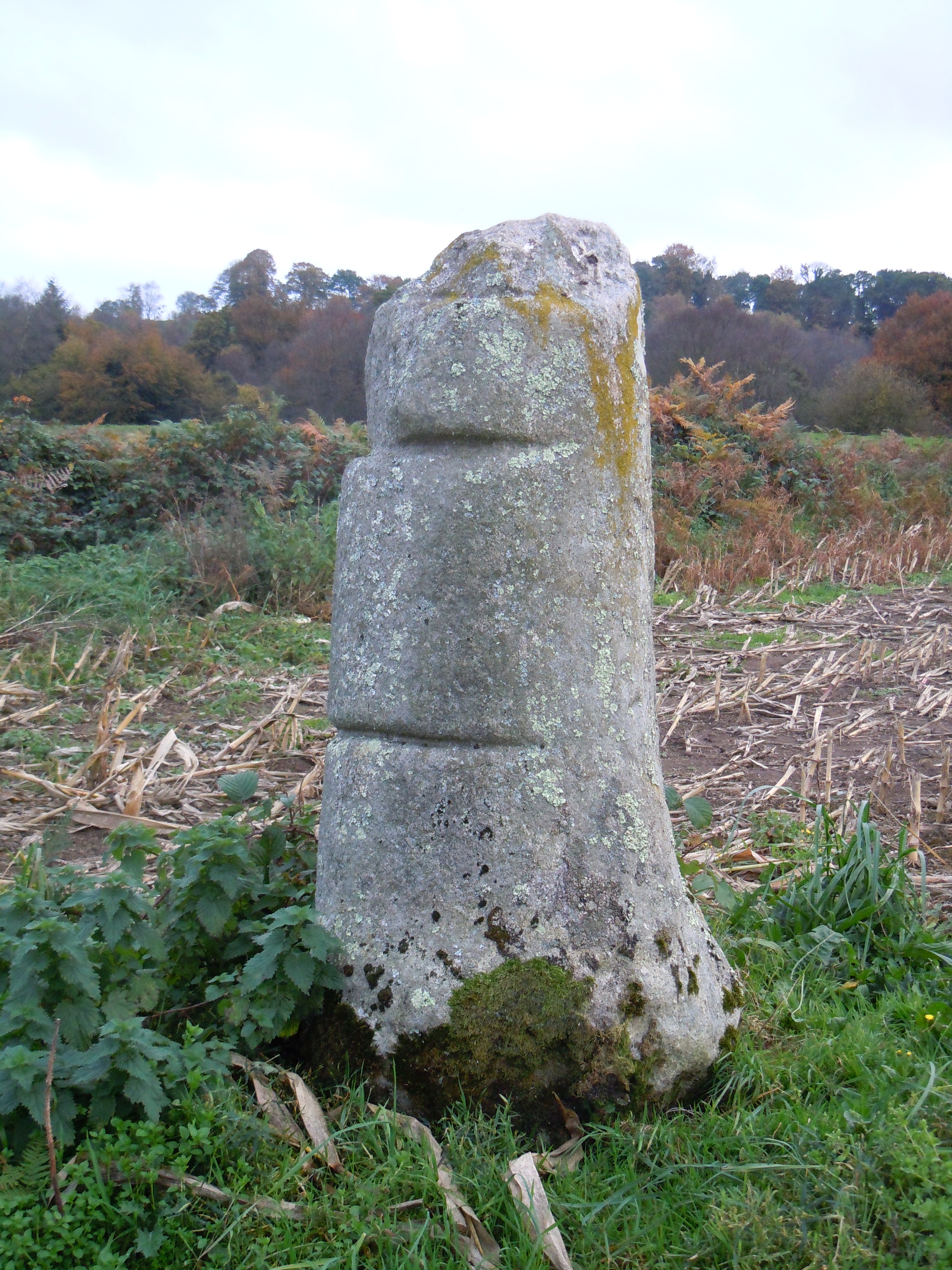
Mutilated cylindrical stone on the ancient Roman road, maybe ancient milestone.

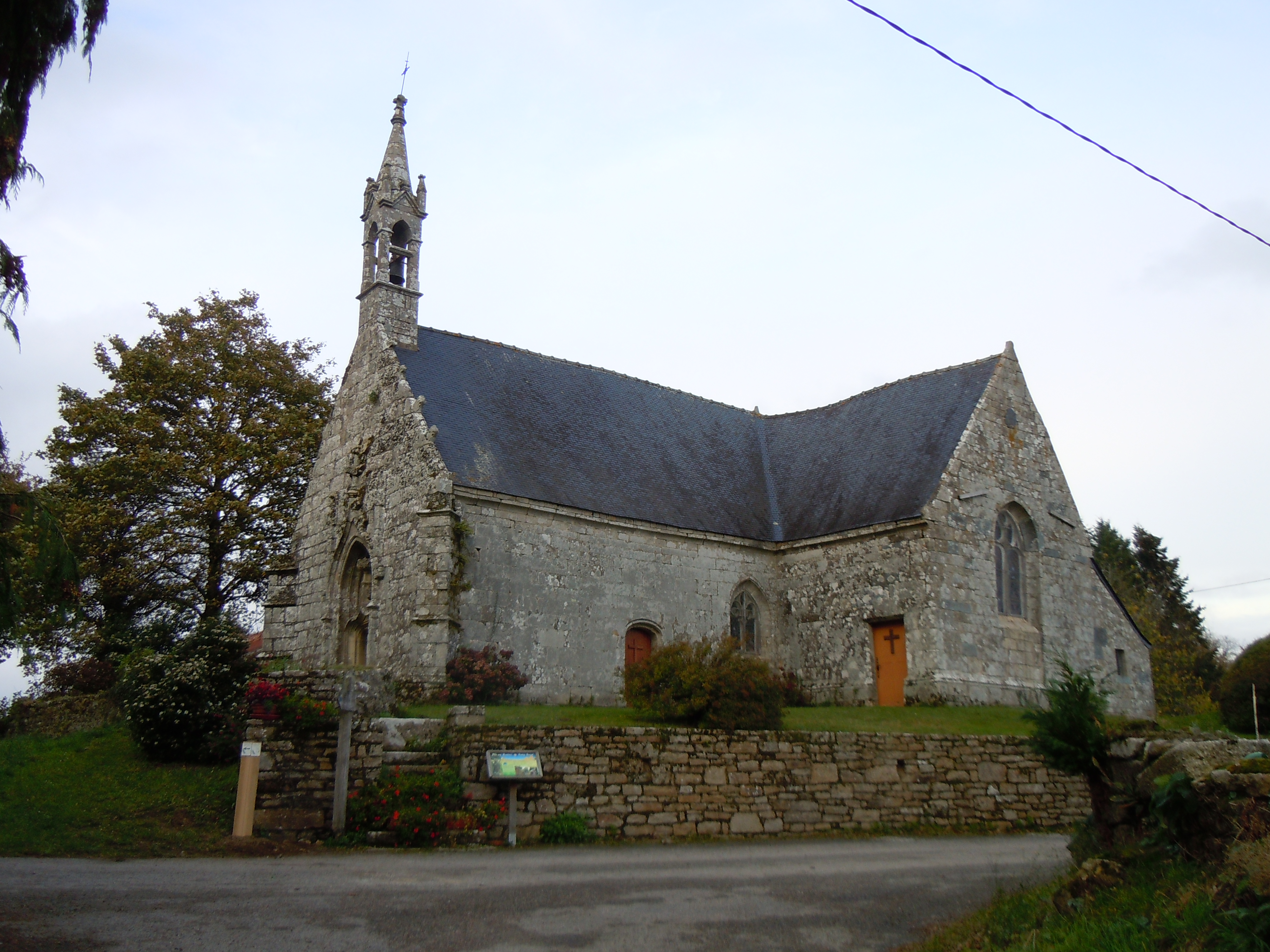
Chapel Saint Germain.

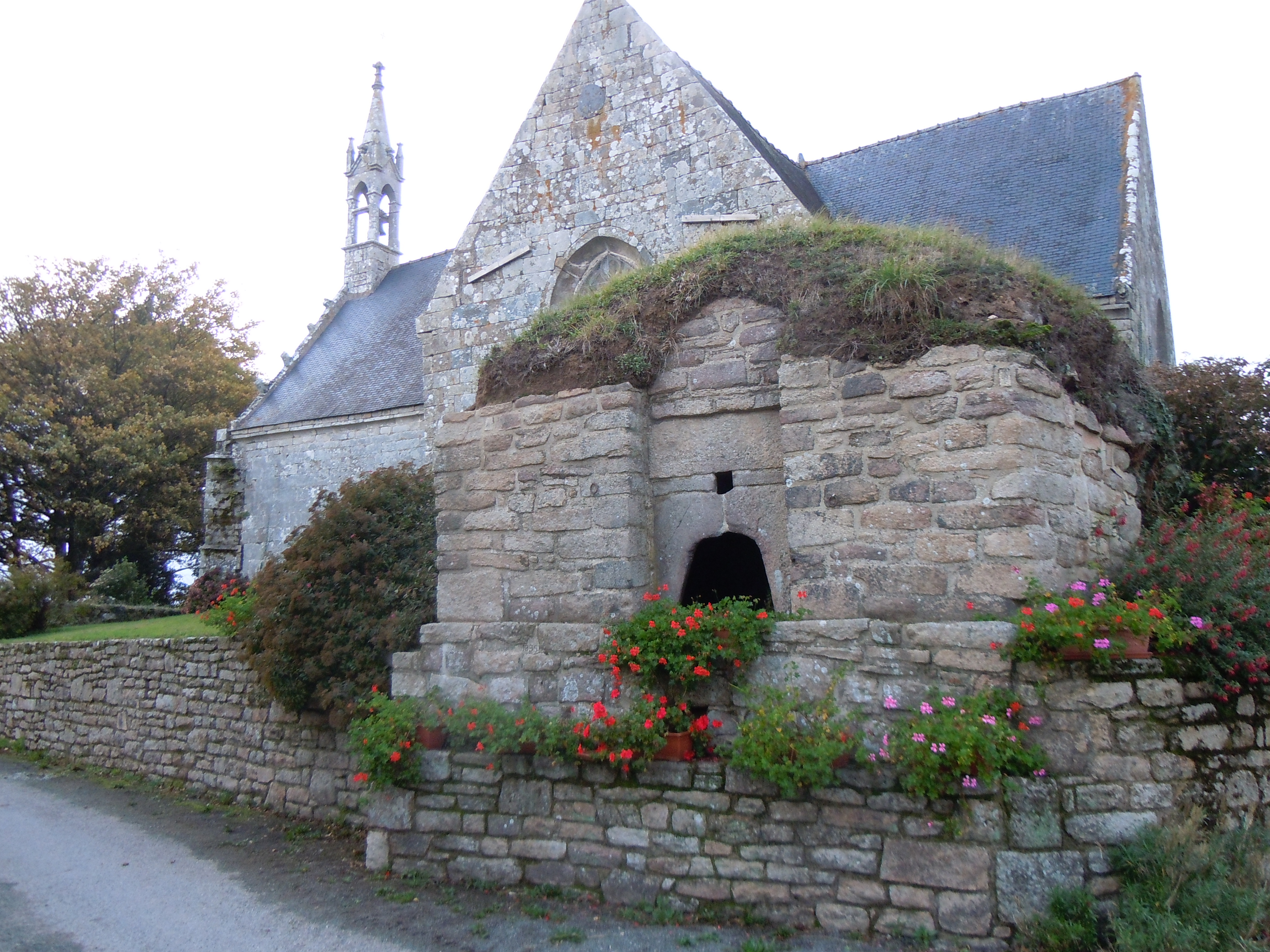
Bread oven in Saint Germain.

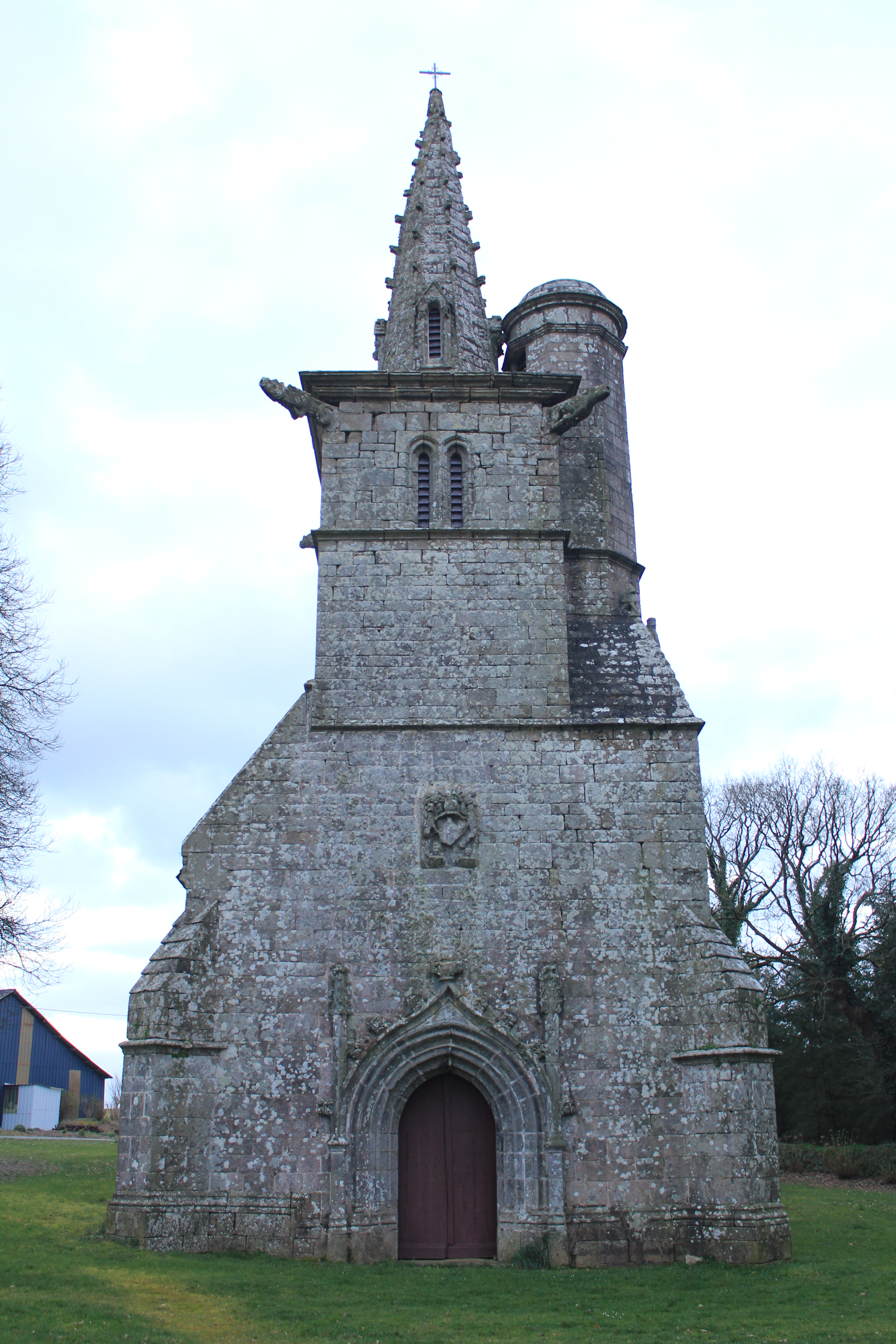
Chapel of Locmaria.

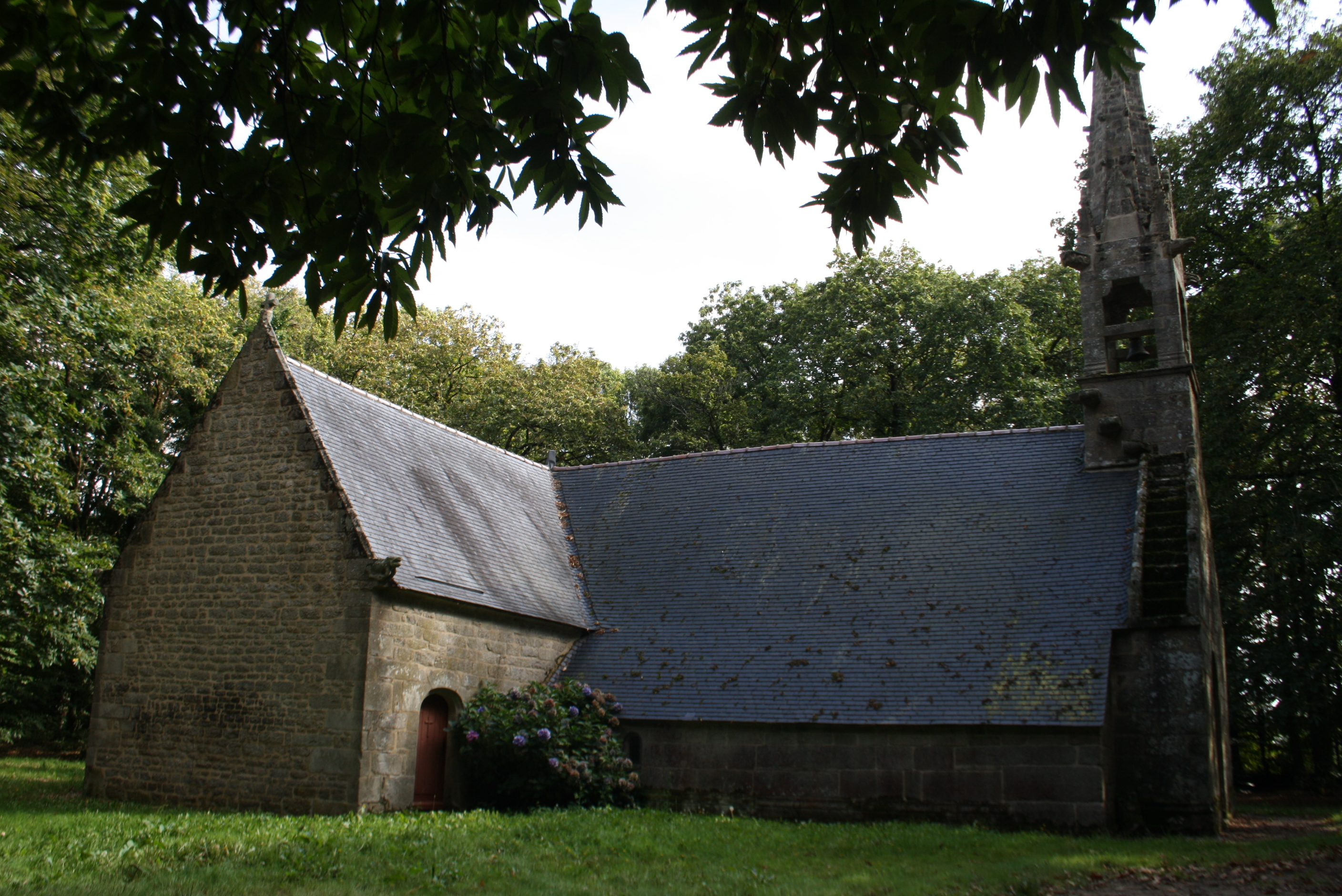
Chapel Saint John.

== See also ==
- Communes of the Morbihan department
