= The Gleaners (Lhermitte) =

Painting by Léon Lhermitte

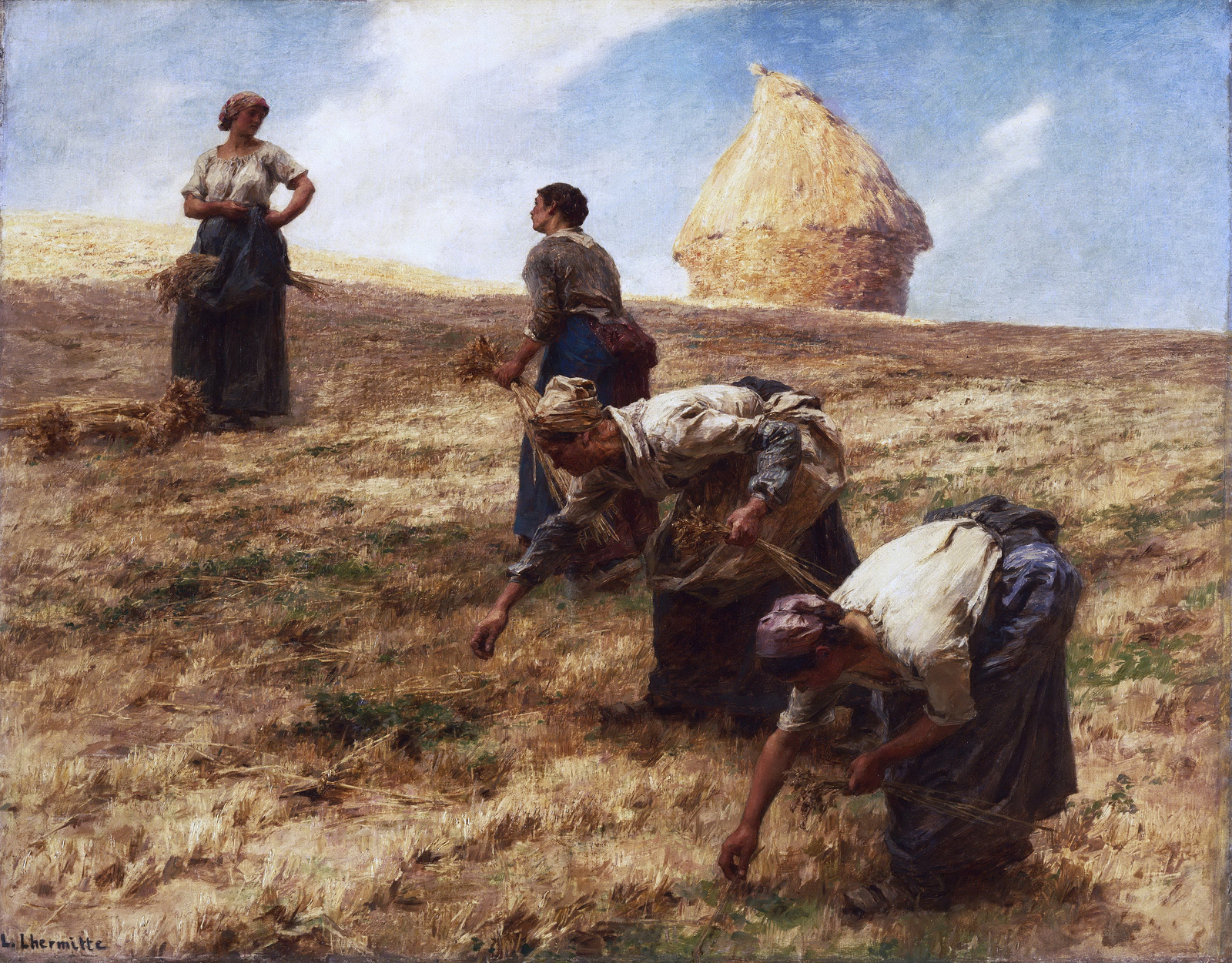
The Gleaners (1887) by Léon Lhermitte

The Gleaners is an oil on canvas painting by French painter Léon Lhermitte, from 1887. It is held in the Philadelphia Museum of Art.

Lhermitte depicts a scene from the working class in France. The painting takes obvious inspiration from Jean-François Millet, and his painting of the same name, The Gleaners.

This painting was one of Lhermitte's that drew the admiration of Vincent van Gogh.
