= Mont-Saint-Père =

- Commune
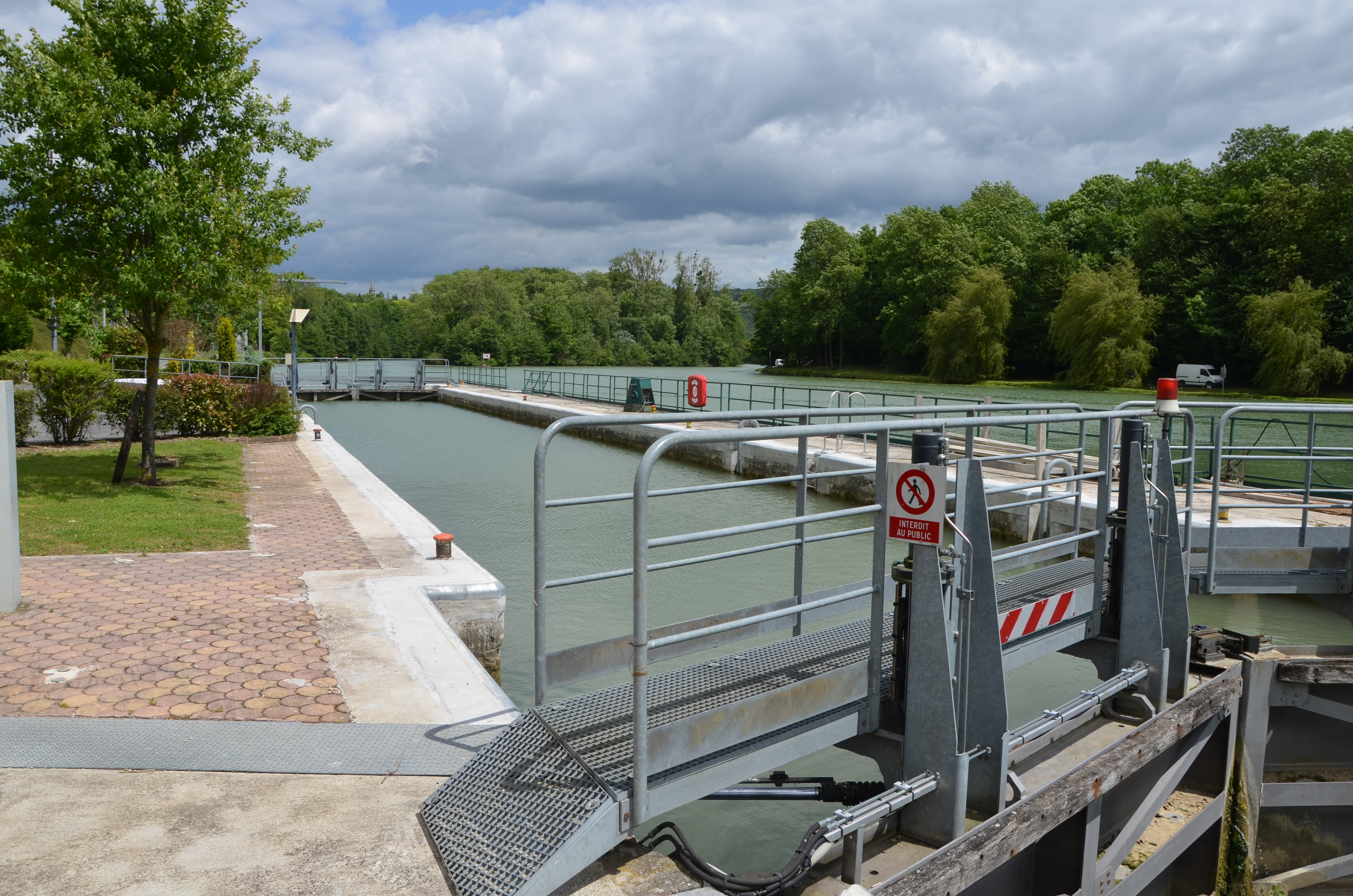
- The lock on the Marne
- Location of Mont-Saint-Père
- Location within France Location within Hauts-de-France
- Coordinates: 49°04′33″N 3°29′25″E
- Country: France
- Region: Hauts-de-France
- Department: Aisne
- Arrondissement: Château-Thierry
- Canton: Château-Thierry
- Intercommunality: CA Région de Château-Thierry

Government
  - Mayor (2026–32): Gilles Cordival
- Area^{1}: 10.69 km^{2} (4.13 sq mi)
- Elevation: 63 m (207 ft)
- Highest elevation: 222 m (728 ft)
- Lowest elevation: 62 m (203 ft)
- Population (2023): 684
  - Density: 64.0/km^{2} (166/sq mi)
- Time zone: UTC+01:00 (CET)
  - Summer (DST): UTC+02:00 (CEST)
- INSEE/Postal code: 02524 /02400
- ^{1} French Land Register data, which excludes lakes, ponds, glaciers > 1 km^{2} (0.386 sq mi or 247 acres) and river estuaries.

Mont-Saint-Père (French pronunciation: [mɔ̃ sɛ̃ pɛʁ]) is a commune in the Aisne department in Hauts-de-France in northern France.

== Population ==
Historical population
Year	Pop.	±% p.a.
1968	391	—
1975	365	−0.98%
1982	445	+2.87%
1990	544	+2.54%
1999	538	−0.12%
2007	639	+2.17%
2012	693	+1.64%
2017	700	+0.20%
2023	684	−0.38%
Source: INSEE

== See also ==
- Communes of the Aisne department
