= Jean-Luc Fichet =

French politician (born 1953)

Senator of Finistère
- Incumbent
- Assumed office 25 September 2017
- Constituency: Finistère

Senator of Finistère
- In office 1 October 2008 – 30 September 2014

President of Morlaix Communauté
- In office 28 April 2014 – 9 October 2017

Mayor of Lanmeur
- In office 20 March 1989 – 5 October 2017

Departmental Councilor (General Councilor) of Finistère
- In office 23 March 1998 – 27 March 2011

Personal details
- Born: 15 July 1953 (age 72) Saint-Brieuc-de-Mauron, France
- Party: Socialist Party
- Occupation: Specialized educator

Jean-Luc Fichet (born 15 July 1953 in Saint-Brieuc-de-Mauron) is a French politician and a member of the Senate of France. He represents the Finistère department and is a member of the Socialist Party.

== Biography ==
A trained special education teacher, he was mayor of Lanmeur from 1989 to 2017 and a member of the Finistère General Council from 1998 to 2011. In 2001, he became one of the vice-presidents of the general council. He was elected senator on September 21, 2008, during the 2008 French Senate election. He is notably the author of a parliamentary report on herbal medicine. In 2014, he became president of the Morlaix Communauté.

He returned to the Senate on September 25, 2017, replacing François Marc, who resigned from his seat. A member of the Law Commission and the Socialist Group's executive committee, he is interested in issues related to health and regional development.

For the 2022 presidential election, Jean-Luc Fichet has granted his endorsement to Anne Hidalgo (PS).

In 2023, he was elected as a member of the Cour de Justice de la République.

== Bibliography ==
- Page on the Senate website (in French)
