= Brignac =

Brignac may refer to:

== Places ==
- Brignac, Hérault, France
- Brignac, Morbihan, France
- Brignac-la-Plaine, Corrèze, France

== People ==
- Reid Brignac (born 1986), American baseball player

== See also ==
- Armand de Brignac, a French Champagne
