= Paul Anselin =

French military officer and politician (1931–2023)

Member of the Regional Council of Brittany
- In office 16 March 1986 – 21 March 2010

General Councillor of the Canton of Ploërmel
- In office 25 March 1979 – 25 March 2001
- Preceded by: Jules Bouchaud
- Succeeded by: Pierre Kerloc'h

Mayor of Ploërmel
- In office 19 March 1977 – 21 March 2008
- Preceded by: Jules Bouchaud
- Succeeded by: Béatrice Le Marre

Personal details
- Born: 28 August 1931 Arcachon, France
- Died: 8 March 2023 (aged 91) Ploërmel, France
- Party: CNIP; UDF; UMP
- Occupation: Military officer

Paul Anselin (28 August 1931 – 8 March 2023) was a French military officer and politician who served as mayor of Ploërmel from 1977 to 2008.

== Biography ==
Born in Arcachon on 28 August 1931, Anselin fought in the Algerian War as a paratrooper, where he met Jacques Chirac. As a law student, he joined the Corpo Assas. He was initially supportive of Charles de Gaulle, but broke off his support after the fate of the Harkis.

Anselin was elected mayor of Ploërmel in 1977 and was consistently re-elected until 2008, when he was defeated by Béatrice Le Marre of the Socialist Party. He represented the Canton of Ploërmel in the General Council of Morbihan. He also served in the Regional Council of Brittany from 1986 to 2010 and was president of the Ploërmel Communauté and chairman of the board of directors of the Departmental Fire and Rescue Service.

=== Controversies ===
Anselin was heavily authoritative over his municipal mandate; his adversaries went as far as to nickname him "Pol Pot". The commune of Ploërmel, with a population of 9000, was equipped with 63 surveillance cameras, for which he won a Big Brother Award in 2006. That year, Ploërmel experienced the second-highest increases in property taxes (+36.2%) and housing taxes (+12.1%) in Brittany.

In 2006, Anselin erected a Monument of Pope John Paul II more than seven meters high, offered by his friend, the Georgian sculptor, Zurab Tsereteli, for the Pope's contributions to the fall of communism. The French laws on secularism were used to denounce the monument, and it was eventually moved onto private land in 2018.

In 1999, Anselin ordered his driver to run a red light in Rennes, which caused a traffic collision. He was indicted in 2002 due to his connection to the Mitterrand–Pasqua affair and given a 15-month suspended prison sentence along with a fine of €30,000 in 2009.

=== Death ===
Paul Anselin died in Ploërmel on 8 March 2023, at the age of 91.

== Book ==
- Francisco Miranda, le héros sacrifié (2018)
