= Guégon =

Commune in Brittany, France

Guégon Gwegon
- Commune
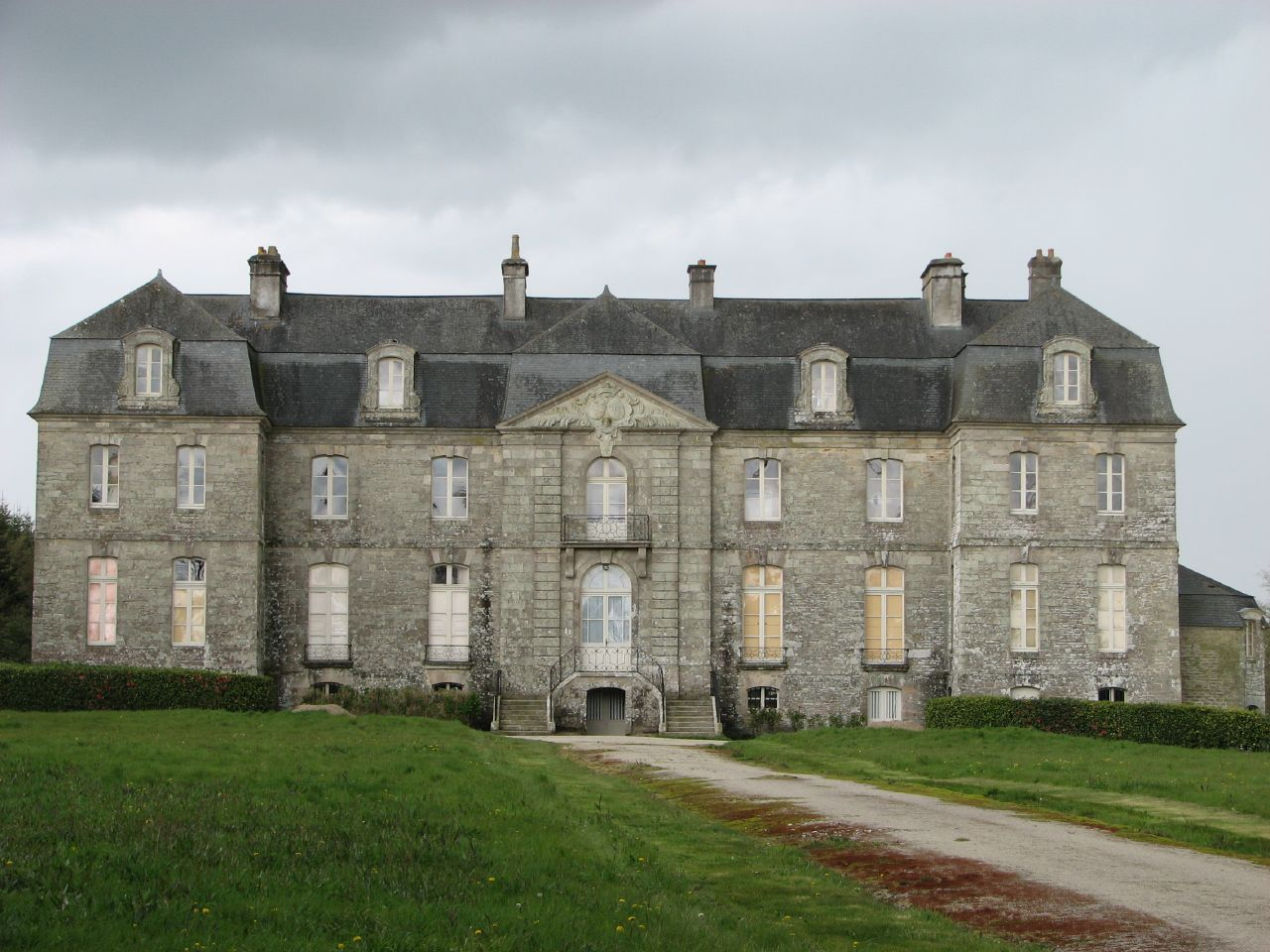
- The château de Trégranteur

- Coat of arms
- Location of Guégon
- Location within France Location within Brittany
- Coordinates: 47°56′19″N 2°33′48″W
- Country: France
- Region: Brittany
- Department: Morbihan
- Arrondissement: Pontivy
- Canton: Ploërmel
- Intercommunality: Ploërmel Communauté

Government
  - Mayor (2026–32): Marie-Noëlle Amiot
- Area^{1}: 53.52 km^{2} (20.66 sq mi)
- Highest elevation: 162 m (531 ft)
- Lowest elevation: 27 m (89 ft)
- Population (2023): 2,365
  - Density: 44.19/km^{2} (114.4/sq mi)
- Time zone: UTC+01:00 (CET)
  - Summer (DST): UTC+02:00 (CEST)
- INSEE/Postal code: 56070 /56120
- ^{1} French Land Register data, which excludes lakes, ponds, glaciers > 1 km^{2} (0.386 sq mi or 247 acres) and river estuaries.

Guégon (French pronunciation: [ɡeɡɔ̃]; Breton: Gwegon) is a commune in the Morbihan department of Brittany in north-western France.

== Population ==
Historical population
Year	Pop.	±% p.a.
1968	2,298	—
1975	2,276	−0.14%
1982	2,334	+0.36%
1990	2,334	+0.00%
1999	2,395	+0.29%
2007	2,396	+0.01%
2012	2,353	−0.36%
2017	2,287	−0.57%
2023	2,365	+0.56%
Source: INSEE

Inhabitants of Guégon are called in French Guégonnais.

== Breton language ==
In 2008, 35.21% of the children in Guégon attended the French-Breton bilingual schools for primary education.

== See also ==
- Communes of the Morbihan department
