= Mohon =

Mohon Mozhon
- Commune
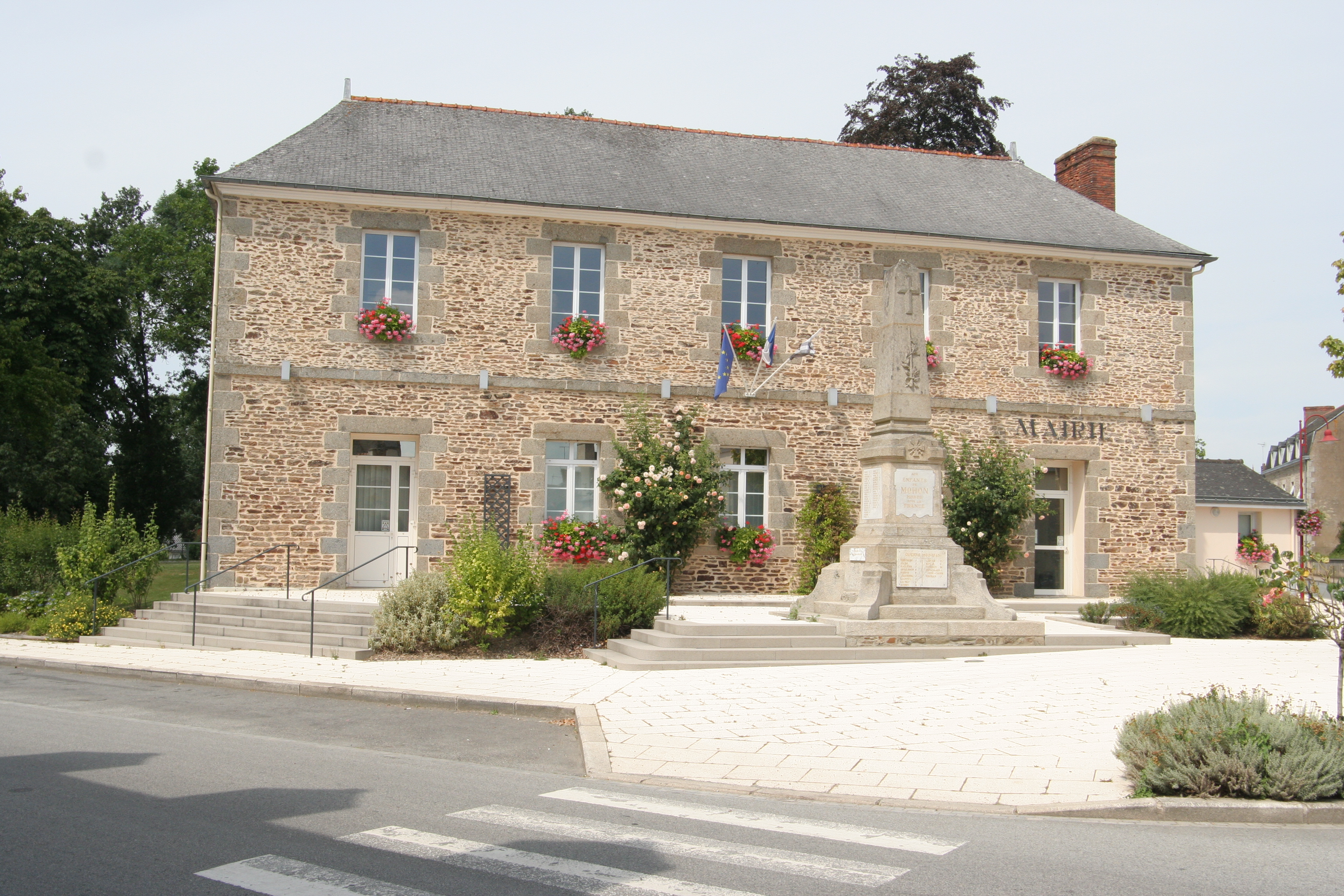
- The town hall in Mohon

- Coat of arms
- Location of Mohon
- Location within France Location within Brittany
- Coordinates: 48°03′12″N 2°31′30″W
- Country: France
- Region: Brittany
- Department: Morbihan
- Arrondissement: Pontivy
- Canton: Ploërmel
- Intercommunality: Ploërmel Communauté

Government
  - Mayor (2026–32): Josiane Denis
- Area^{1}: 37.83 km^{2} (14.61 sq mi)
- Highest elevation: 126 m (413 ft)
- Lowest elevation: 47 m (154 ft)
- Population (2023): 991
  - Density: 26.2/km^{2} (67.8/sq mi)
- Time zone: UTC+01:00 (CET)
  - Summer (DST): UTC+02:00 (CEST)
- INSEE/Postal code: 56134 /56490
- ^{1} French Land Register data, which excludes lakes, ponds, glaciers > 1 km^{2} (0.386 sq mi or 247 acres) and river estuaries.

Mohon (French pronunciation: [mɔɔ̃]; Breton: Mozhon) is a commune in the Morbihan department of Brittany in north-western France. Inhabitants of Mohon are called in French Mohonnais.

== See also ==
- Communes of the Morbihan department
