= Cruguel =

Commune in Brittany, France

Cruguel Krugell
- Commune
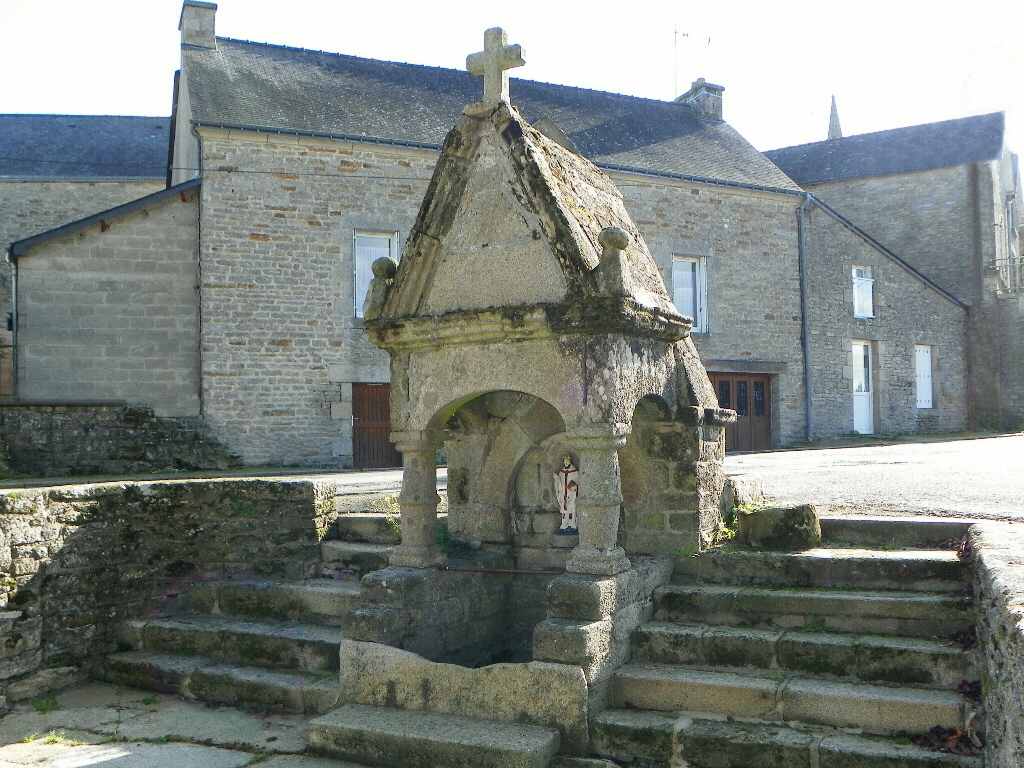
- The Fountain of Saint Brieuc, in Cruguel

- Coat of arms
- Location of Cruguel
- Location within France Location within Brittany
- Coordinates: 47°52′46″N 2°35′39″W
- Country: France
- Region: Brittany
- Department: Morbihan
- Arrondissement: Pontivy
- Canton: Ploërmel
- Intercommunality: Ploërmel Communauté

Government
  - Mayor (2026–32): David Boulvais
- Area^{1}: 17.17 km^{2} (6.63 sq mi)
- Highest elevation: 166 m (545 ft)
- Lowest elevation: 52 m (171 ft)
- Population (2023): 664
  - Density: 38.7/km^{2} (100/sq mi)
- Time zone: UTC+01:00 (CET)
  - Summer (DST): UTC+02:00 (CEST)
- INSEE/Postal code: 56051 /56420
- ^{1} French Land Register data, which excludes lakes, ponds, glaciers > 1 km^{2} (0.386 sq mi or 247 acres) and river estuaries.

Cruguel (French pronunciation: [kʁyɡɛl]; Breton: Krugell) is a commune in the Morbihan department of Brittany in north-western France.

== Demographics ==
Inhabitants of Cruguel are called in French Cruguellois.

== See also ==
- Communes of the Morbihan department
