= Montertelot =

Montertelot Mousterdelav
- Commune
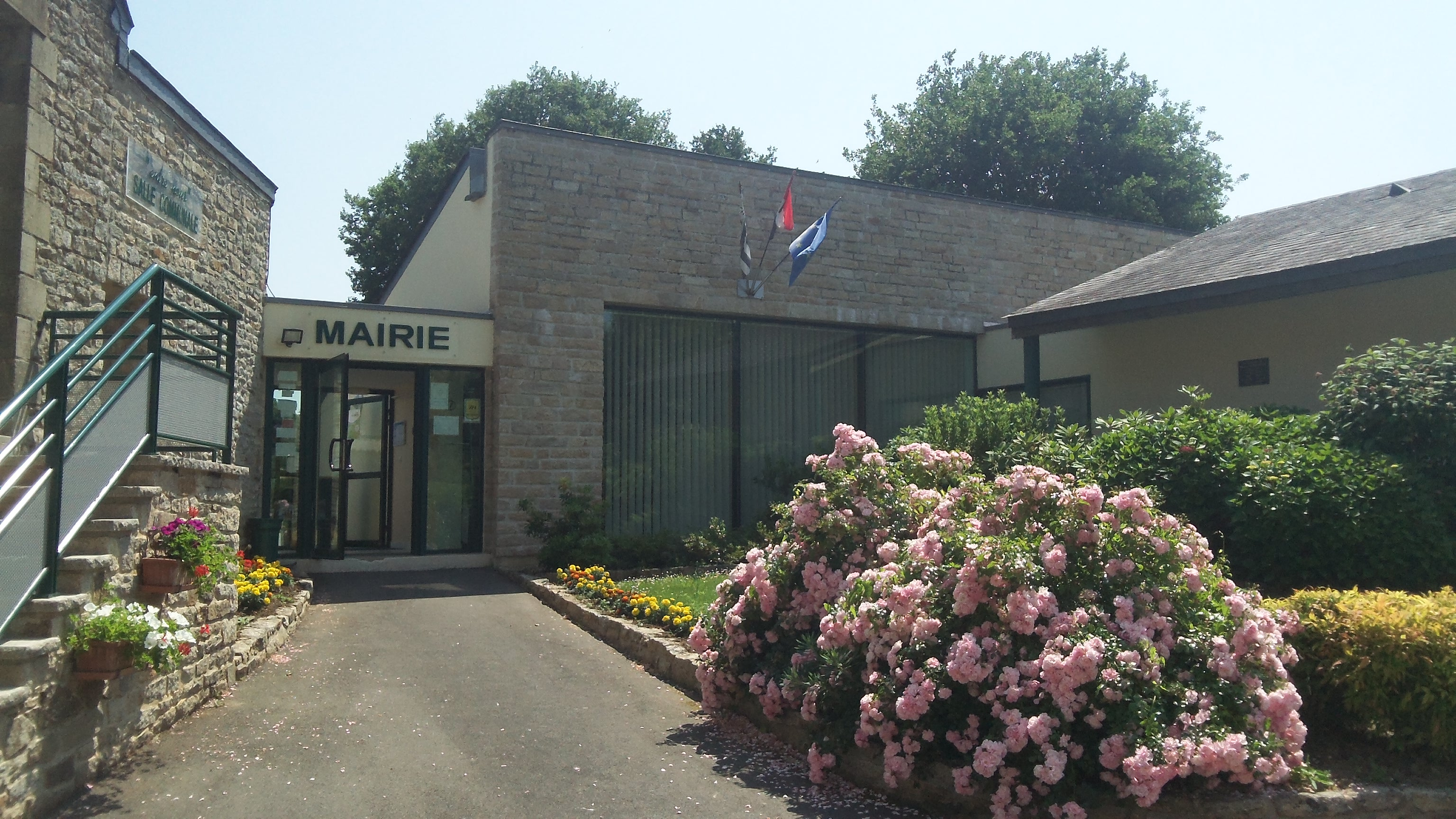
- The town hall in Montertelot
- Location of Montertelot
- Location within France Location within Brittany
- Coordinates: 47°52′53″N 2°25′15″W
- Country: France
- Region: Brittany
- Department: Morbihan
- Arrondissement: Pontivy
- Canton: Ploërmel
- Intercommunality: Ploërmel

Government
  - Mayor (2026–32): Nellie Jolivet
- Area^{1}: 2.64 km^{2} (1.02 sq mi)
- Elevation: 25 m (82 ft)
- Highest elevation: 100 m (330 ft)
- Lowest elevation: 19 m (62 ft)
- Population (2023): 375
  - Density: 142/km^{2} (368/sq mi)
- Time zone: UTC+01:00 (CET)
  - Summer (DST): UTC+02:00 (CEST)
- INSEE/Postal code: 56139 /56800
- ^{1} French Land Register data, which excludes lakes, ponds, glaciers > 1 km^{2} (0.386 sq mi or 247 acres) and river estuaries.

Montertelot (French pronunciation: [mɔ̃tɛʁtəlo]; Breton: Mousterdelav) is a commune in the Morbihan department in Brittany in north-western France. It is situated between the cities of Rennes and Vannes, about 6 km from Ploërmel. Inhabitants of Montertelot are called Montertelotais.

== See also ==
- Communes of the Morbihan department
