= Arrondissement of Pontivy =

Coordinates: 48°04′N 2°58′W

Pontivy
- Arrondissement
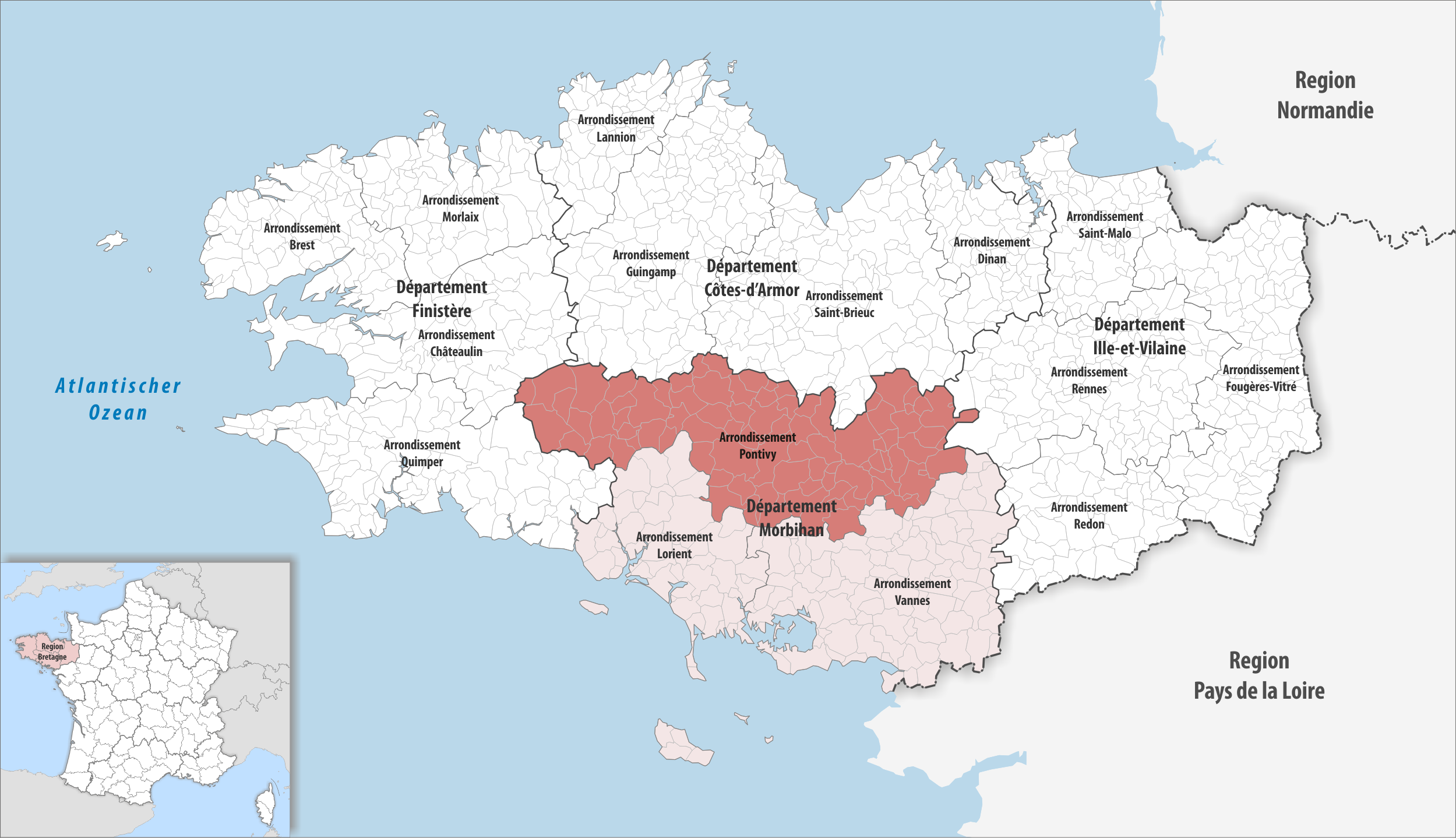
- Location within the region Brittany
- Country: France
- Region: Brittany
- Department: Morbihan
- No. of communes: {{{nbcomm}}}
- Area: 2,944.6 km^{2} (1,136.9 sq mi)
- Population (2023): 158,506
  - Density: 53.829/km^{2} (139.42/sq mi)
- INSEE code: 562

The arrondissement of Pontivy is an arrondissement of France in the Morbihan department in the Brittany region. It has 92 communes. Its population is 156,187 (2021), and its area is 2,944.6 km^{2} (1,136.9 sq mi).

== Composition ==
The communes of the arrondissement of Pontivy, and their INSEE codes, are:

1. Baud (56010)
2. Berné (56014)
3. Bignan (56017)
4. Billio (56019)
5. Bréhan (56024)
6. Brignac (56025)
7. Buléon (56027)
8. Campénéac (56032)
9. La Chapelle-Neuve (56039)
10. Cléguérec (56041)
11. Concoret (56043)
12. Crédin (56047)
13. Le Croisty (56048)
14. La Croix-Helléan (56050)
15. Cruguel (56051)
16. Évellys (56144)
17. Évriguet (56056)
18. Le Faouët (56057)
19. Forges de Lanouée (56102)
20. Gourhel (56065)
21. Gourin (56066)
22. La Grée-Saint-Laurent (56068)
23. Guégon (56070)
24. Guéhenno (56071)
25. Gueltas (56072)
26. Guémené-sur-Scorff (56073)
27. Guénin (56074)
28. Guern (56076)
29. Guillac (56079)
30. Guilliers (56080)
31. Guiscriff (56081)
32. Helléan (56082)
33. Josselin (56091)
34. Kerfourn (56092)
35. Kergrist (56093)
36. Kernascléden (56264)
37. Langoëlan (56099)
38. Langonnet (56100)
39. Lantillac (56103)
40. Lanvénégen (56105)
41. Lignol (56110)
42. Locmalo (56113)
43. Locminé (56117)
44. Loyat (56122)
45. Malguénac (56125)
46. Mauron (56127)
47. Melrand (56128)
48. Ménéac (56129)
49. Meslan (56131)
50. Mohon (56134)
51. Montertelot (56139)
52. Moréac (56140)
53. Moustoir-Ac (56141)
54. Néant-sur-Yvel (56145)
55. Neulliac (56146)
56. Noyal-Pontivy (56151)
57. Persquen (56156)
58. Pleugriffet (56160)
59. Ploërdut (56163)
60. Ploërmel (56165)
61. Plouray (56170)
62. Plumelec (56172)
63. Pluméliau-Bieuzy (56173)
64. Plumelin (56174)
65. Pontivy (56178)
66. Priziac (56182)
67. Radenac (56189)
68. Réguiny (56190)
69. Rohan (56198)
70. Roudouallec (56199)
71. Le Saint (56201)
72. Saint-Aignan (56203)
73. Saint-Allouestre (56204)
74. Saint-Barthélemy (56207)
75. Saint-Brieuc-de-Mauron (56208)
76. Saint-Caradec-Trégomel (56210)
77. Sainte-Brigitte (56209)
78. Saint-Gérand-Croixanvec (56213)
79. Saint-Gonnery (56215)
80. Saint-Jean-Brévelay (56222)
81. Saint-Léry (56225)
82. Saint-Malo-des-Trois-Fontaines (56227)
83. Saint-Servant (56236)
84. Saint-Thuriau (56237)
85. Saint-Tugdual (56238)
86. Séglien (56242)
87. Silfiac (56245)
88. Le Sourn (56246)
89. Taupont (56249)
90. Tréhorenteuc (56256)
91. La Trinité-Porhoët (56257)
92. Val d'Oust (56197)

== History ==
The arrondissement of Pontivy was created in 1800. At the January 2017 reorganisation of the arrondissements of Morbihan, it gained 21 communes from the arrondissement of Vannes.

As a result of the reorganisation of the cantons of France which came into effect in 2015, the borders of the cantons are no longer related to the borders of the arrondissements. The cantons of the arrondissement of Pontivy were, as of January 2015:

1. Baud
2. Cléguérec
3. Gourin
4. Guémené-sur-Scorff
5. Josselin
6. Le Faouët
7. Locminé
8. Pontivy
9. Rohan
10. Saint-Jean-Brévelay
