= Gourhel =

Commune in Brittany, France

Gourhel Gourhael
- Commune
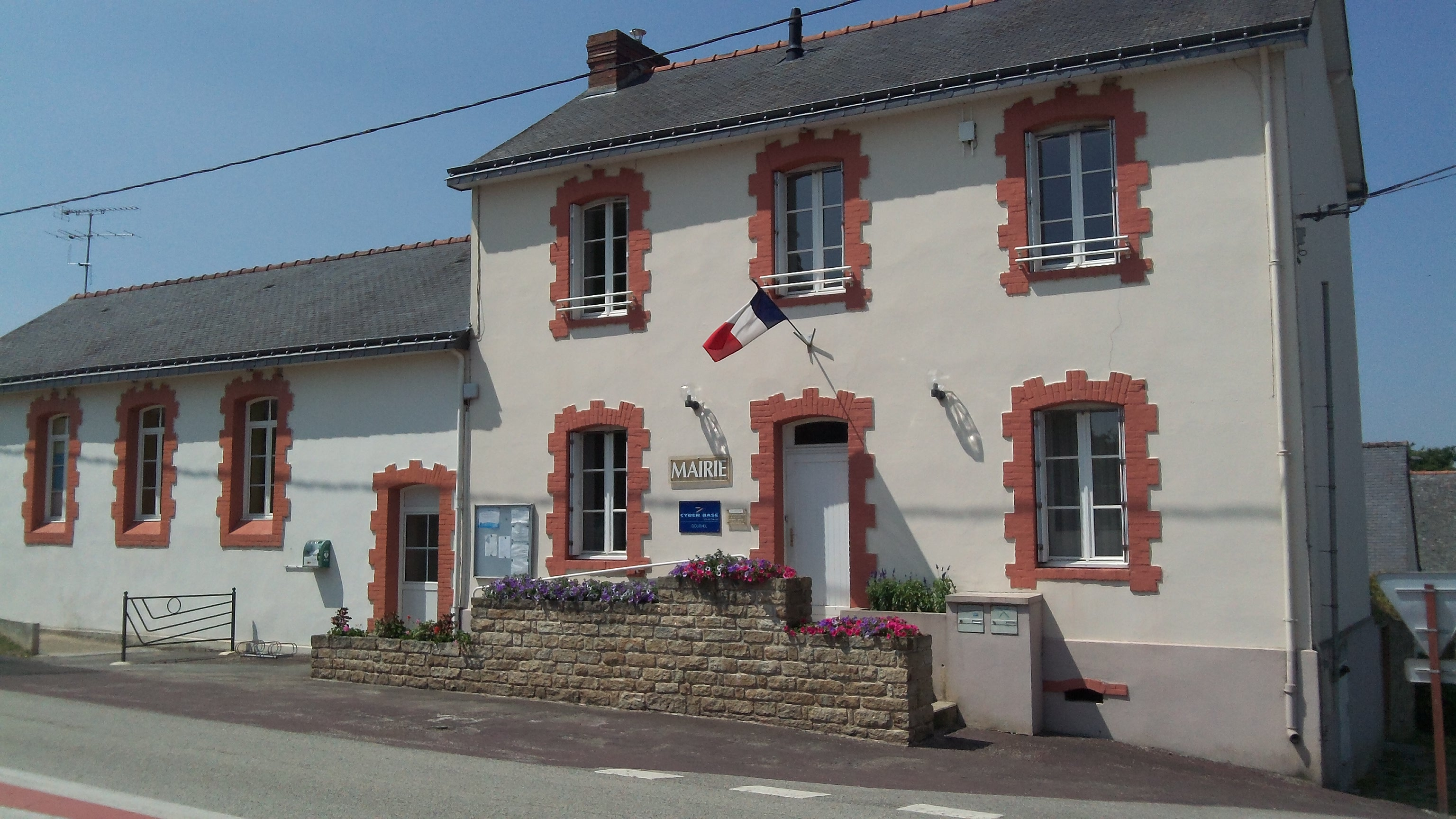
- The town hall in Gourhel

- Coat of arms
- Location of Gourhel
- Location within France Location within Brittany
- Coordinates: 47°56′18″N 2°21′34″W
- Country: France
- Region: Brittany
- Department: Morbihan
- Arrondissement: Pontivy
- Canton: Ploërmel
- Intercommunality: Ploërmel Communauté

Government
  - Mayor (2026–32): Kévin Argentin
- Area^{1}: 2.83 km^{2} (1.09 sq mi)
- Highest elevation: 101 m (331 ft)
- Lowest elevation: 62 m (203 ft)
- Population (2023): 711
  - Density: 251/km^{2} (651/sq mi)
- Time zone: UTC+01:00 (CET)
  - Summer (DST): UTC+02:00 (CEST)
- INSEE/Postal code: 56065 /56800
- ^{1} French Land Register data, which excludes lakes, ponds, glaciers > 1 km^{2} (0.386 sq mi or 247 acres) and river estuaries.

Gourhel (French pronunciation: [ɡuʁɛl]; Breton: Gourhael) is a commune in the Morbihan department of Brittany in north-western France. Inhabitants of Gourhel are called in French Gourhelois.

== See also ==
- Communes of the Morbihan department
