= La Croix-Helléan =

Commune in Brittany, France

La Croix-Helléan Ar Groaz-Helean
- Commune
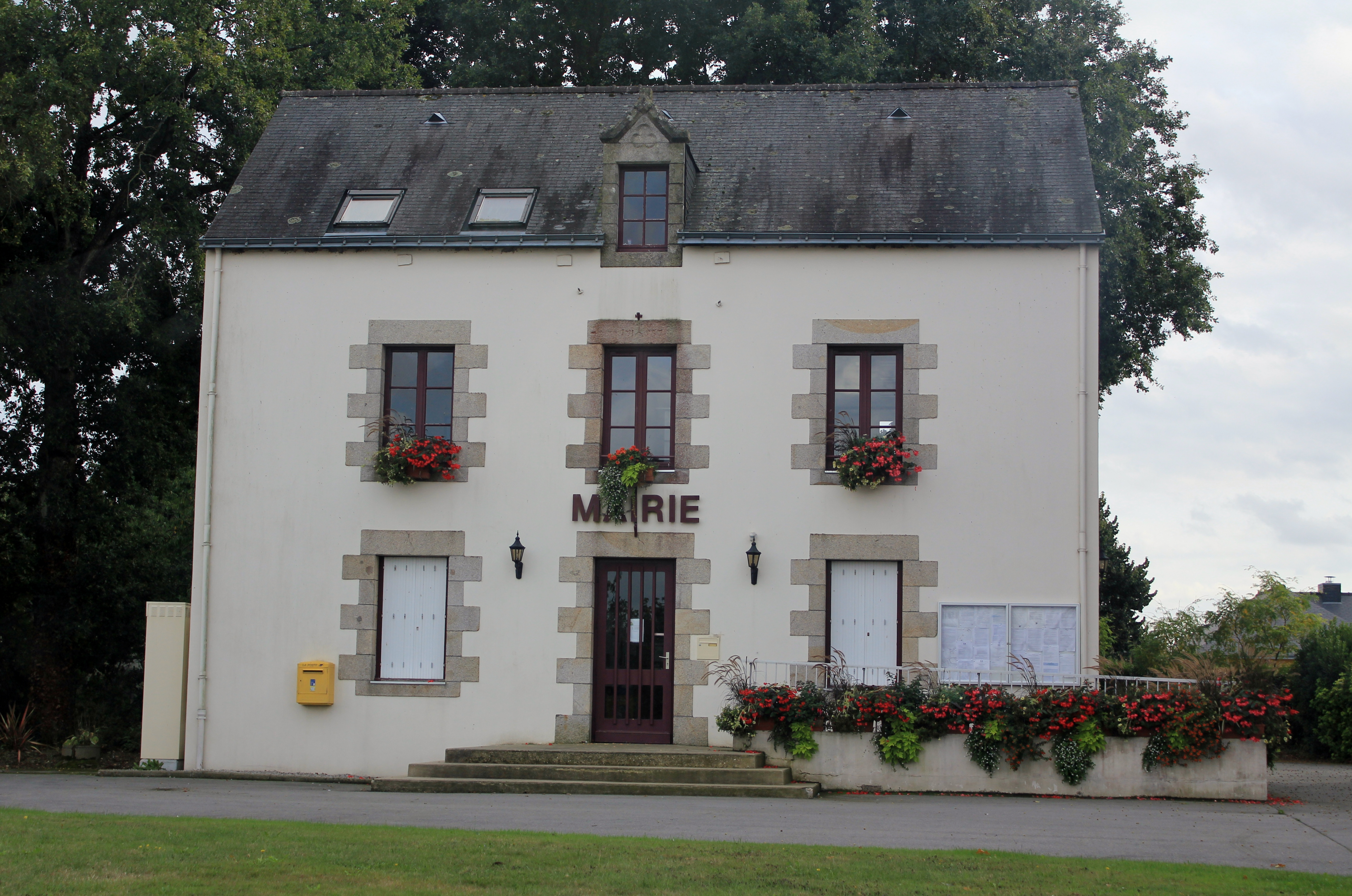
- The town hall in La Croix-Helléan
- Location of La Croix-Helléan
- Location within France Location within Brittany
- Coordinates: 47°57′28″N 2°29′59″W
- Country: France
- Region: Brittany
- Department: Morbihan
- Arrondissement: Pontivy
- Canton: Ploërmel
- Intercommunality: Ploërmel Communauté

Government
  - Mayor (2026–32): Thierry Chamaillard
- Area^{1}: 14.40 km^{2} (5.56 sq mi)
- Highest elevation: 111 m (364 ft)
- Lowest elevation: 47 m (154 ft)
- Population (2023): 892
  - Density: 61.9/km^{2} (160/sq mi)
- Time zone: UTC+01:00 (CET)
  - Summer (DST): UTC+02:00 (CEST)
- INSEE/Postal code: 56050 /56120
- ^{1} French Land Register data, which excludes lakes, ponds, glaciers > 1 km^{2} (0.386 sq mi or 247 acres) and river estuaries.

La Croix-Helléan (French pronunciation: [la kʁwa eleɑ̃]; Breton: Ar Groez-Helean) is a commune in the Morbihan department of Brittany in north-western France.

== Demographics ==
Inhabitants of La Croix-Helléan are called in French Croisillons.

== See also ==
- Communes of the Morbihan department
