= Lantillac =

Commune in Brittany, France

Lantillac Landeliav
- Commune
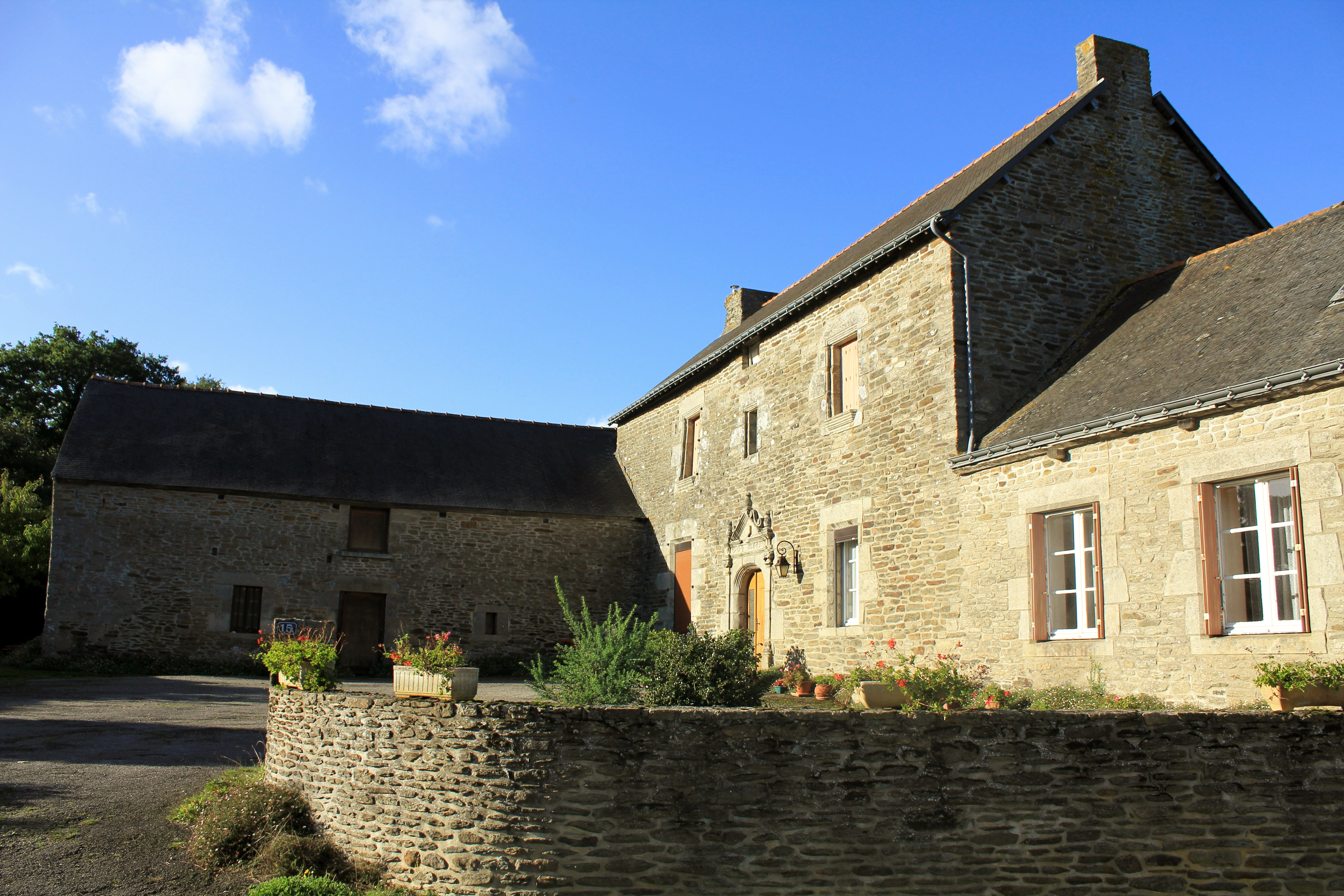
- A house on Rue du Manoir, in Lantillac

- Coat of arms
- Location of Lantillac
- Location within France Location within Brittany
- Coordinates: 47°57′27″N 2°39′02″W
- Country: France
- Region: Brittany
- Department: Morbihan
- Arrondissement: Pontivy
- Canton: Ploërmel
- Intercommunality: Ploërmel Communauté

Government
  - Mayor (2026–32): Michel Bertho
- Area^{1}: 7.72 km^{2} (2.98 sq mi)
- Highest elevation: 124 m (407 ft)
- Lowest elevation: 41 m (135 ft)
- Population (2023): 296
  - Density: 38.3/km^{2} (99.3/sq mi)
- Time zone: UTC+01:00 (CET)
  - Summer (DST): UTC+02:00 (CEST)
- INSEE/Postal code: 56103 /56120
- ^{1} French Land Register data, which excludes lakes, ponds, glaciers > 1 km^{2} (0.386 sq mi or 247 acres) and river estuaries.

Lantillac (French pronunciation: [lɑ̃tijak]; Breton: Lantilieg) is a commune in the Morbihan department of Brittany in north-western France. Inhabitants of Lantillac are called in French Lantillacois.

== See also ==
- Communes of the Morbihan department
