= Évriguet =

Commune in Brittany, France

Évriguet Evriged
- Commune
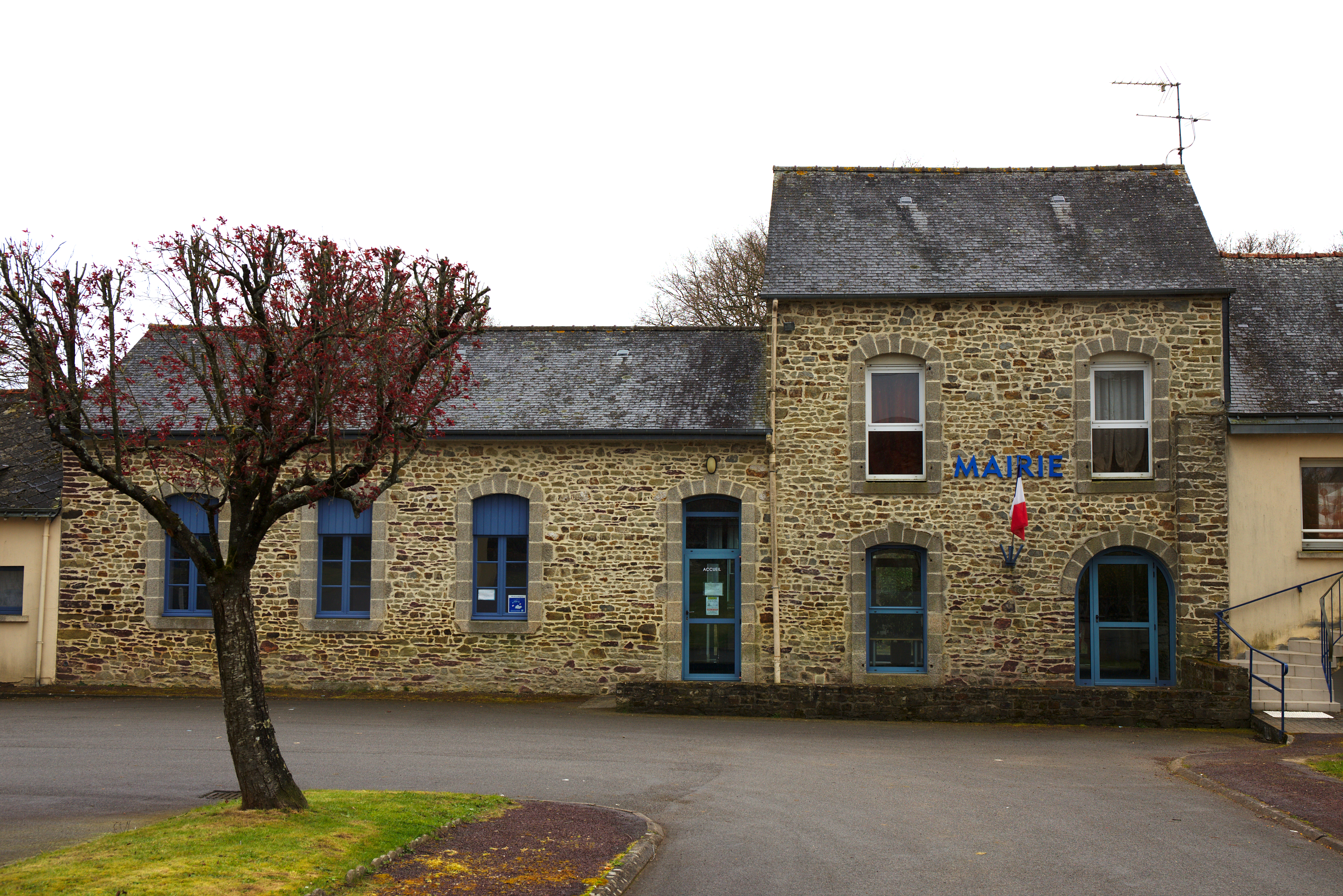
- Town hall.

- Coat of arms
- Location of Évriguet
- Location within France Location within Brittany
- Coordinates: 48°04′47″N 2°24′37″W
- Country: France
- Region: Brittany
- Department: Morbihan
- Arrondissement: Pontivy
- Canton: Ploërmel
- Intercommunality: Ploërmel Communauté

Government
  - Mayor (2026–32): Sophie Coutant
- Area^{1}: 4.98 km^{2} (1.92 sq mi)
- Highest elevation: 112 m (367 ft)
- Lowest elevation: 67 m (220 ft)
- Population (2023): 210
  - Density: 42/km^{2} (110/sq mi)
- Time zone: UTC+01:00 (CET)
  - Summer (DST): UTC+02:00 (CEST)
- INSEE/Postal code: 56056 /56490
- ^{1} French Land Register data, which excludes lakes, ponds, glaciers > 1 km^{2} (0.386 sq mi or 247 acres) and river estuaries.

Évriguet (Evriged in Breton) is a commune in the Morbihan department of Brittany in north-western France. Inhabitants of Évriguet are called in French Évriguetois.

== See also ==
- Communes of the Morbihan department
