= Guilliers =

Commune in Brittany, France

Guilliers Gwiler-Porc'hoed
- Commune
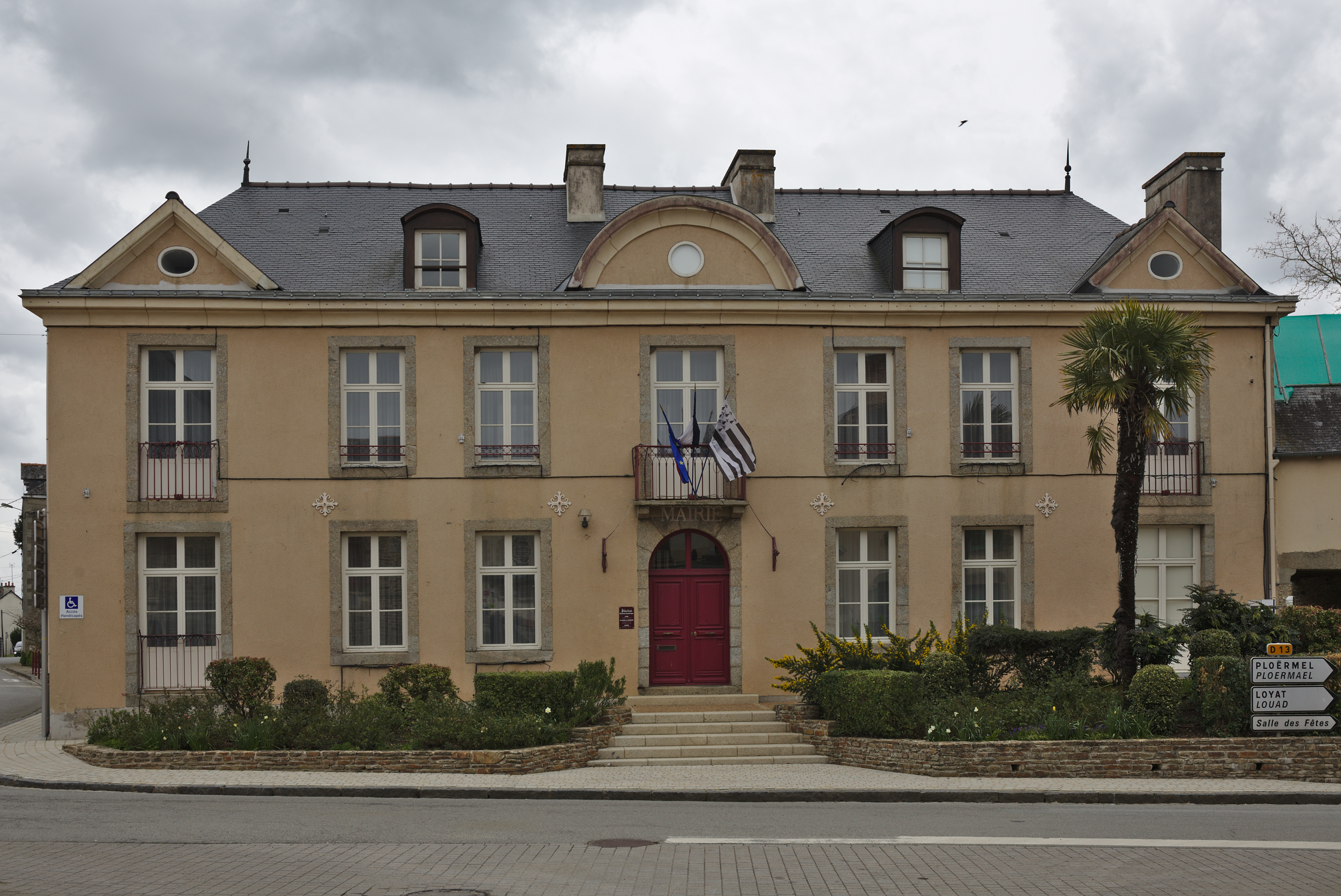
- Town hall

- Coat of arms
- Location of Guilliers
- Location within France Location within Brittany
- Coordinates: 48°02′36″N 2°24′15″W
- Country: France
- Region: Brittany
- Department: Morbihan
- Arrondissement: Pontivy
- Canton: Ploërmel
- Intercommunality: Ploërmel Communauté

Government
  - Mayor (2026–32): Jean-Luc Gicquel
- Area^{1}: 35.14 km^{2} (13.57 sq mi)
- Highest elevation: 114 m (374 ft)
- Lowest elevation: 47 m (154 ft)
- Population (2023): 1,368
  - Density: 38.93/km^{2} (100.8/sq mi)
- Time zone: UTC+01:00 (CET)
  - Summer (DST): UTC+02:00 (CEST)
- INSEE/Postal code: 56080 /56490
- ^{1} French Land Register data, which excludes lakes, ponds, glaciers > 1 km^{2} (0.386 sq mi or 247 acres) and river estuaries.

Guilliers (French pronunciation: [ɡilje]; Breton: Gwiler-Porc'hoed) is a commune in the Morbihan department of Brittany in north-western France. Inhabitants of Guilliers are called in French Guilliérois.

== Geography ==
The town is located 49 km (30 mi) northeast of Vannes. Historically, Guiiliers belongs to Porhoët and Upper Brittany.

== Map ==
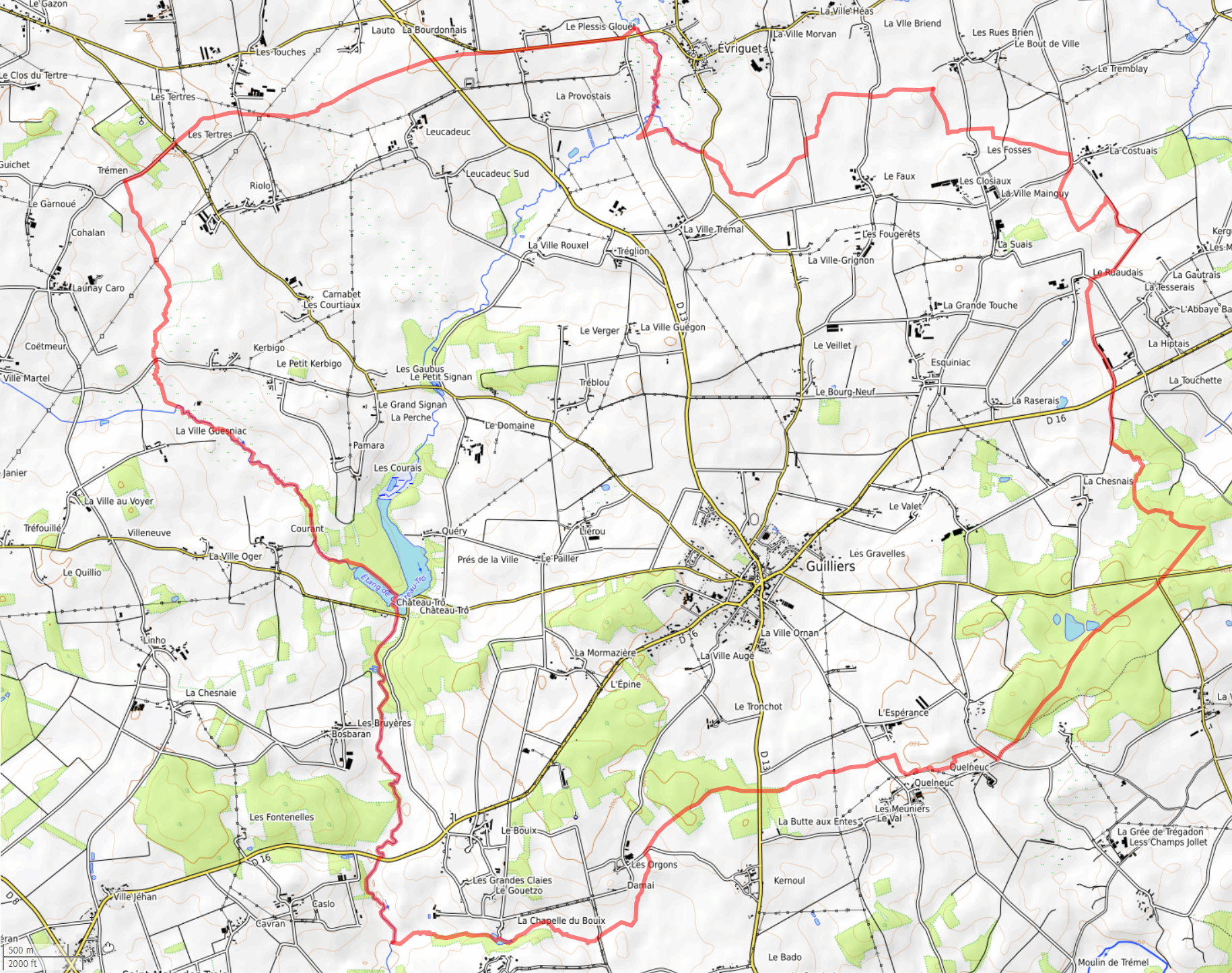
Topographic map

== See also ==
- Communes of the Morbihan department
