= Néant-sur-Yvel =

Néant-sur-Yvel Neant
- Commune
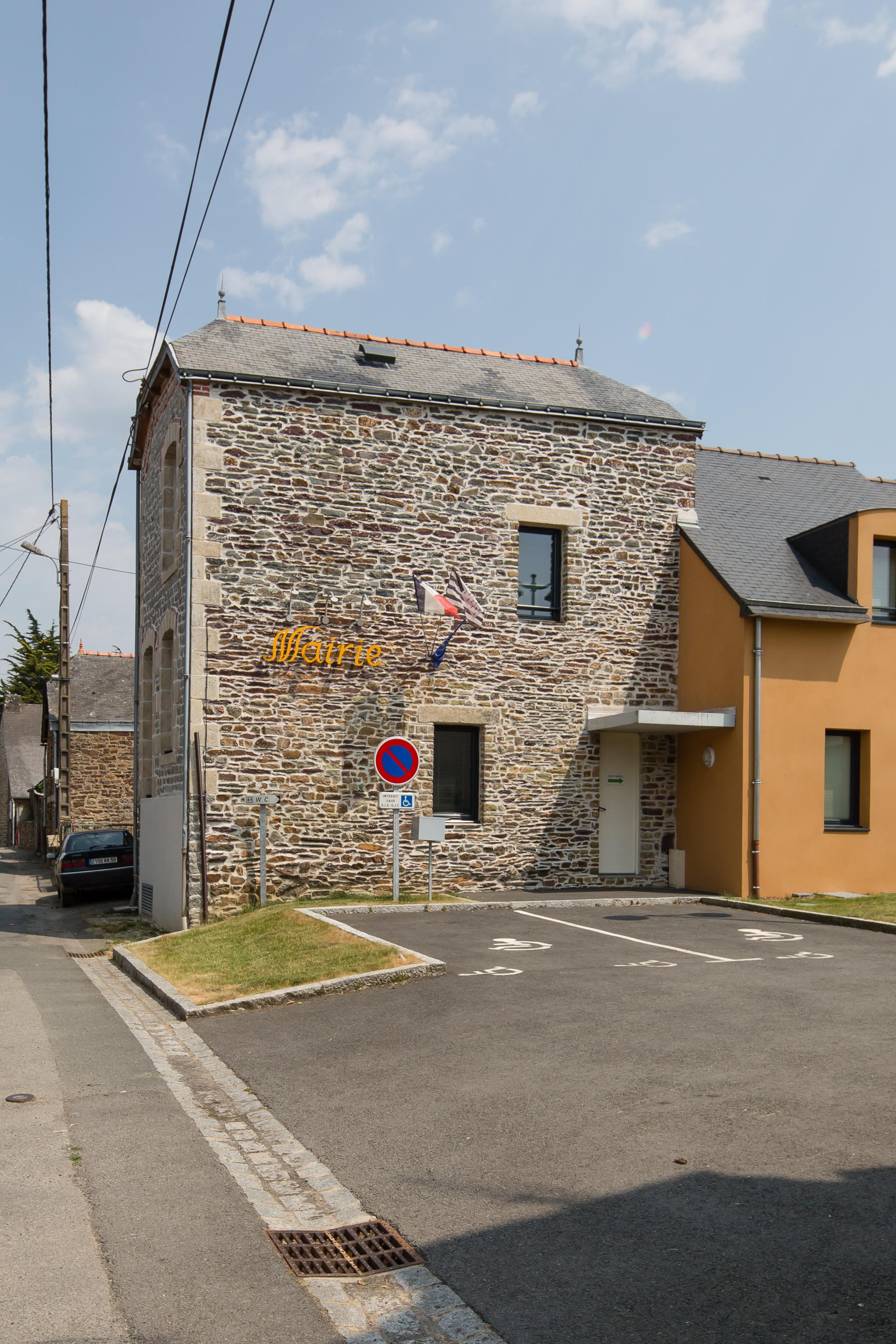
- The town hall in Néant-sur-Yvel

- Coat of arms
- Location of Néant-sur-Yvel
- Location within France Location within Brittany
- Coordinates: 48°00′51″N 2°19′40″W
- Country: France
- Region: Brittany
- Department: Morbihan
- Arrondissement: Pontivy
- Canton: Ploërmel
- Intercommunality: Ploërmel Communauté

Government
  - Mayor (2026–32): Philippe Louapre
- Area^{1}: 32.30 km^{2} (12.47 sq mi)
- Highest elevation: 150 m (490 ft)
- Lowest elevation: 37 m (121 ft)
- Population (2023): 1,045
  - Density: 32.35/km^{2} (83.79/sq mi)
- Time zone: UTC+01:00 (CET)
  - Summer (DST): UTC+02:00 (CEST)
- INSEE/Postal code: 56145 /56430
- ^{1} French Land Register data, which excludes lakes, ponds, glaciers > 1 km^{2} (0.386 sq mi or 247 acres) and river estuaries.

Néant-sur-Yvel (French pronunciation: [neɑ̃ syʁ ivɛl]; Breton: Neant) is a commune in the Morbihan department of Brittany in north-western France. The toponym refers to the river Yvel. Inhabitants of Néant-sur-Yvel are called in French Néantais.

== See also ==
- Communes of the Morbihan department
