= Saint-Brieuc-de-Mauron =

Saint-Brieuc-de-Mauron Sant-Brieg-Maoron
- Commune
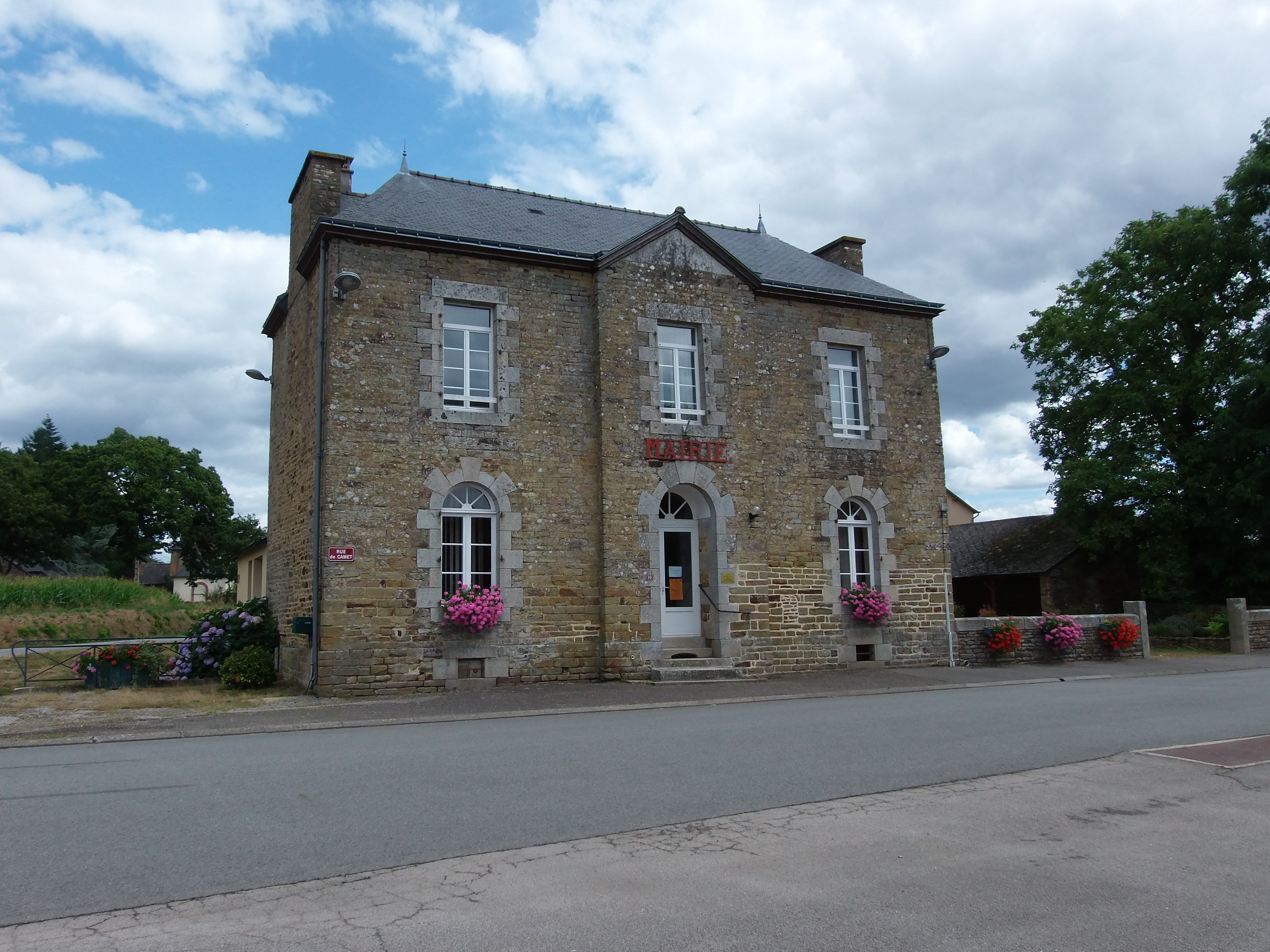
- The town hall in Saint-Brieuc-de-Mauron

- Coat of arms
- Location of Saint-Brieuc-de-Mauron
- Location within France Location within Brittany
- Coordinates: 48°05′25″N 2°21′42″W
- Country: France
- Region: Brittany
- Department: Morbihan
- Arrondissement: Pontivy
- Canton: Ploërmel
- Intercommunality: Ploërmel Communauté

Government
  - Mayor (2026–32): Charles-Édouard Fichet
- Area^{1}: 14.35 km^{2} (5.54 sq mi)
- Highest elevation: 113 m (371 ft)
- Lowest elevation: 52 m (171 ft)
- Population (2023): 308
  - Density: 21.5/km^{2} (55.6/sq mi)
- Time zone: UTC+01:00 (CET)
  - Summer (DST): UTC+02:00 (CEST)
- INSEE/Postal code: 56208 /56430
- ^{1} French Land Register data, which excludes lakes, ponds, glaciers > 1 km^{2} (0.386 sq mi or 247 acres) and river estuaries.

Saint-Brieuc-de-Mauron (French pronunciation: [sɛ̃ bʁijø də moʁɔ̃], literally Saint-Brieuc of Mauron; Breton: Sant-Brieg-Maoron) is a commune in the Morbihan department of Brittany in north-western France.

== Demographics ==
Inhabitants of Saint-Brieuc-de-Mauron are called in French Briochains.

== See also ==
- Communes of the Morbihan department
