= Ménéac =

Ménéac Menieg
- Commune
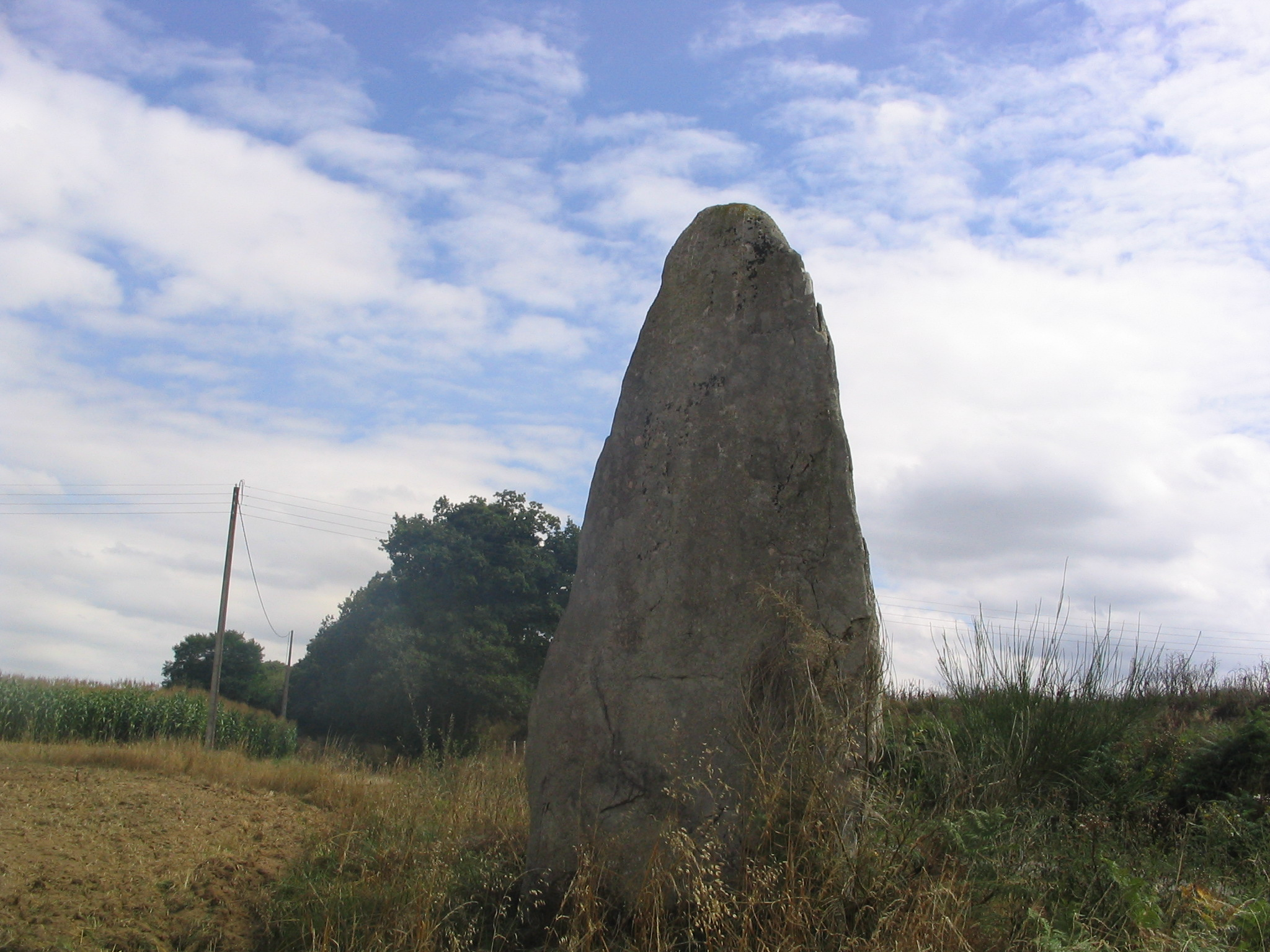
- The Menhir of Camblot, in Ménéac

- Coat of arms
- Location of Ménéac
- Location within France Location within Brittany
- Coordinates: 48°08′25″N 2°27′34″W
- Country: France
- Region: Brittany
- Department: Morbihan
- Arrondissement: Pontivy
- Canton: Ploërmel
- Intercommunality: Ploërmel Communauté

Government
  - Mayor (2026–32): Michel Pichard
- Area^{1}: 68.22 km^{2} (26.34 sq mi)
- Highest elevation: 208 m (682 ft)
- Lowest elevation: 68 m (223 ft)
- Population (2023): 1,476
  - Density: 21.64/km^{2} (56.04/sq mi)
- Time zone: UTC+01:00 (CET)
  - Summer (DST): UTC+02:00 (CEST)
- INSEE/Postal code: 56129 /56490
- ^{1} French Land Register data, which excludes lakes, ponds, glaciers > 1 km^{2} (0.386 sq mi or 247 acres) and river estuaries.

Ménéac (French pronunciation: [meneak]; Breton: Menieg) is a commune in the Morbihan department in Brittany in north-western France. Inhabitants of Ménéac are called in French Ménéacois.

== See also ==
- Communes of the Morbihan department
