= Saint-Servant =

Saint-Servant Sant-Servant-an-Oud
- Commune
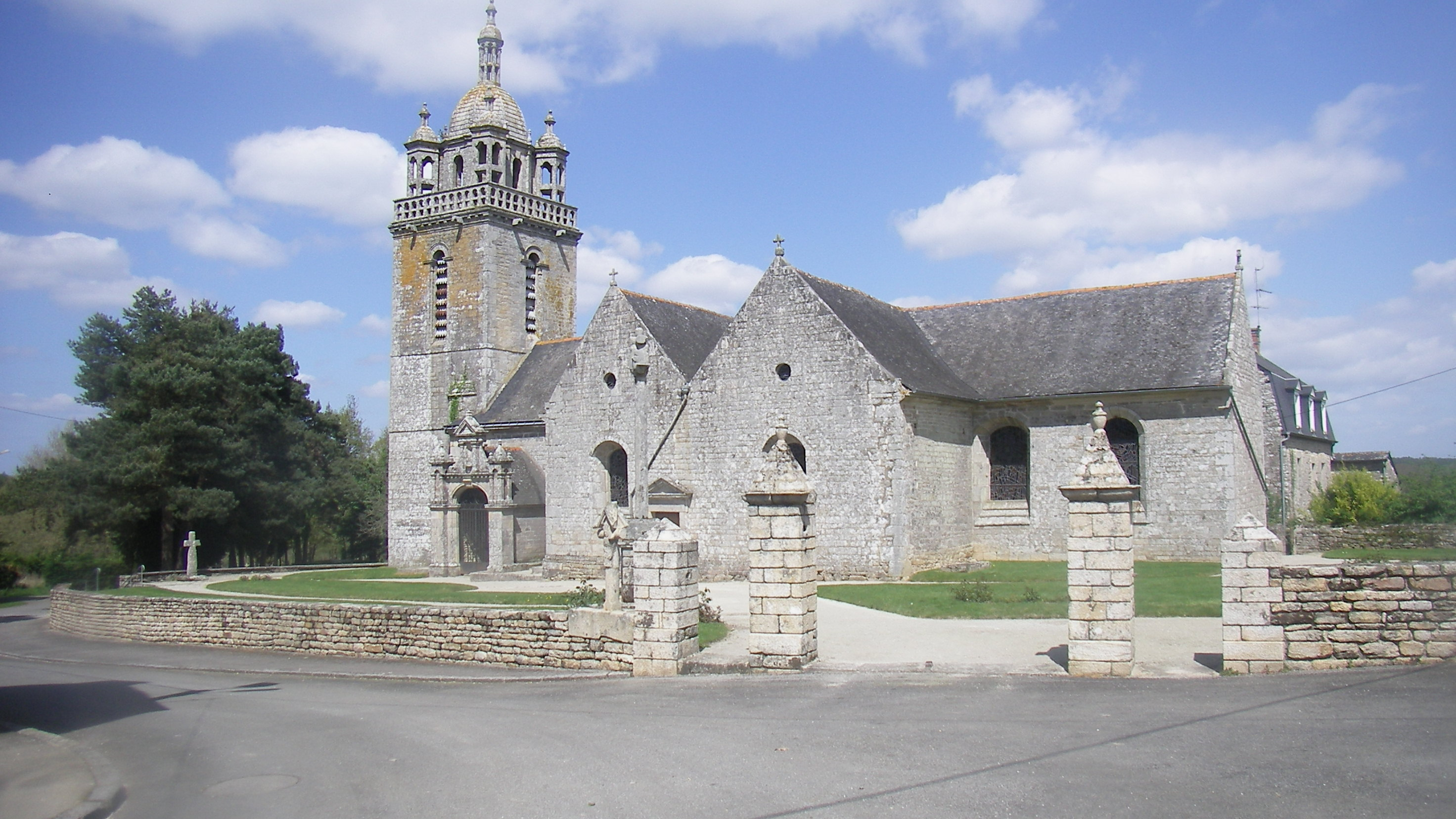
- The church in Saint-Servant

- Coat of arms
- Location of Saint-Servant
- Location within France Location within Brittany
- Coordinates: 47°54′58″N 2°30′41″W
- Country: France
- Region: Brittany
- Department: Morbihan
- Arrondissement: Pontivy
- Canton: Ploërmel
- Intercommunality: Ploërmel Communauté

Government
  - Mayor (2026–32): Maryannick Le Devehat
- Area^{1}: 22.40 km^{2} (8.65 sq mi)
- Highest elevation: 163 m (535 ft)
- Lowest elevation: 22 m (72 ft)
- Population (2023): 806
  - Density: 36.0/km^{2} (93.2/sq mi)
- Time zone: UTC+01:00 (CET)
  - Summer (DST): UTC+02:00 (CEST)
- INSEE/Postal code: 56236 /56120
- ^{1} French Land Register data, which excludes lakes, ponds, glaciers > 1 km^{2} (0.386 sq mi or 247 acres) and river estuaries.

Saint-Servant (Breton: Sant-Servant-an-Oud) is a commune in the Morbihan department of Brittany in north-western France. Inhabitants of Saint-Servant are called in French Servantais.

== See also ==
- Communes of the Morbihan department
