= Saint-Malo-des-Trois-Fontaines =

Saint-Malo-des-Trois-Fontaines Sant-Maloù-an-Teir-Feunteun (Breton)
- Commune
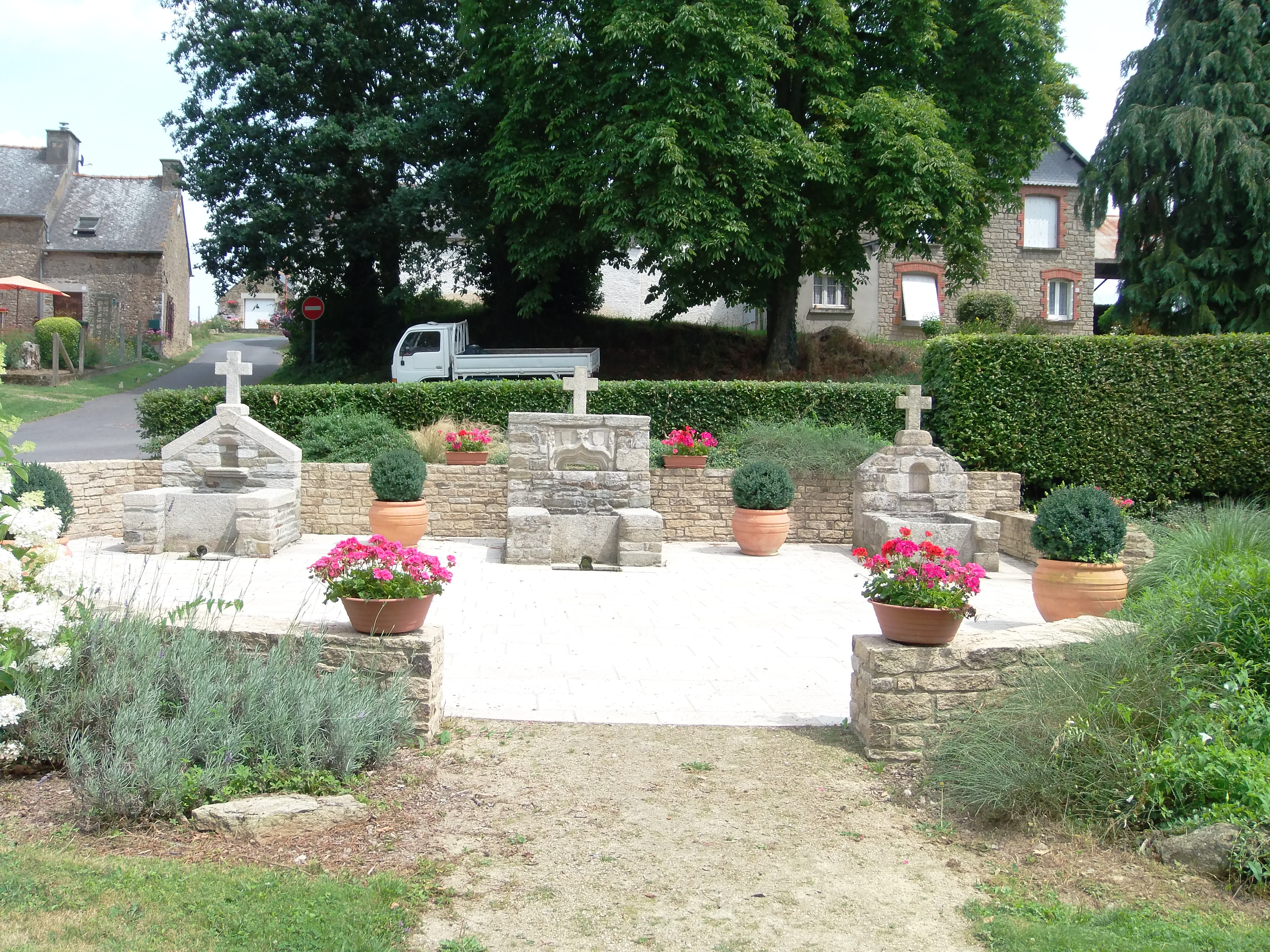
- The three fountains

- Coat of arms
- Location of Saint-Malo-des-Trois-Fontaines
- Location within France Location within Brittany
- Coordinates: 48°00′50″N 2°28′15″W
- Country: France
- Region: Brittany
- Department: Morbihan
- Arrondissement: Pontivy
- Canton: Ploërmel
- Intercommunality: Ploërmel Communauté

Government
  - Mayor (2026–32): Fabienne Tanguy
- Area^{1}: 16.19 km^{2} (6.25 sq mi)
- Highest elevation: 109 m (358 ft)
- Lowest elevation: 38 m (125 ft)
- Population (2023): 545
  - Density: 33.7/km^{2} (87.2/sq mi)
- Time zone: UTC+01:00 (CET)
  - Summer (DST): UTC+02:00 (CEST)
- INSEE/Postal code: 56227 /56490
- ^{1} French Land Register data, which excludes lakes, ponds, glaciers > 1 km^{2} (0.386 sq mi or 247 acres) and river estuaries.

Saint-Malo-des-Trois-Fontaines (French: [sɛ̃ malo de tʁwɑ fɔ̃tɛn]; Breton: Sant-Maloù-an-Teir-Feunteun; "Saint-Malo of the Three Fountains") is a commune in the Morbihan department of Brittany in north-western France. Inhabitants of Saint-Malo-des-Trois-Fontaines are called in French Malouins.

== See also ==
- Communes of the Morbihan department
