= Taupont =

Taupont Talbont
- Commune
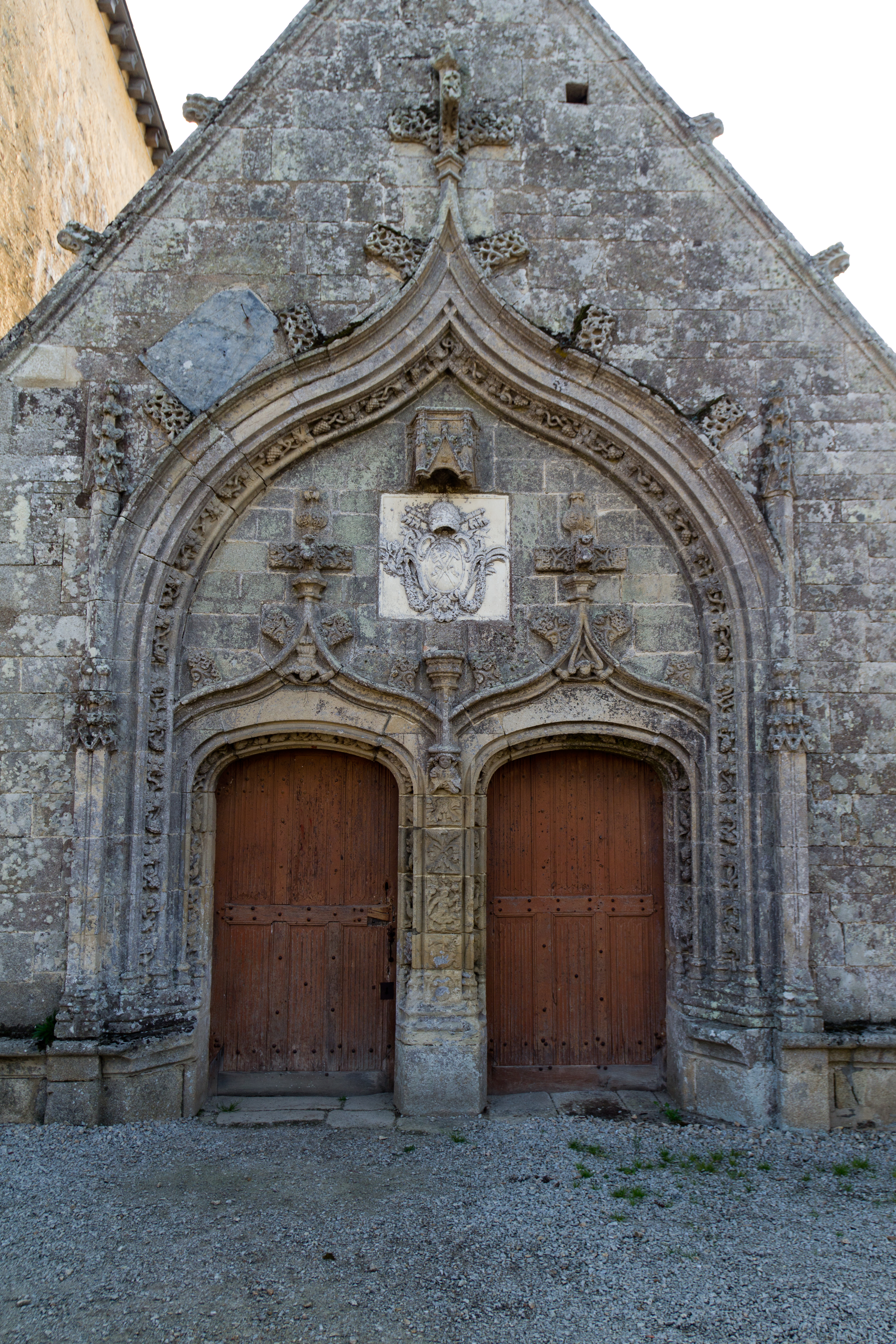
- The doors of the Church of Saint-Golven, in Taupont
- Location of Taupont
- Location within France Location within Brittany
- Coordinates: 47°57′34″N 2°26′15″W
- Country: France
- Region: Brittany
- Department: Morbihan
- Arrondissement: Pontivy
- Canton: Ploërmel
- Intercommunality: Ploërmel

Government
  - Mayor (2026–32): Jean-Charles Sentier
- Area^{1}: 29.17 km^{2} (11.26 sq mi)
- Highest elevation: 91 m (299 ft)
- Lowest elevation: 22 m (72 ft)
- Population (2023): 2,428
  - Density: 83.24/km^{2} (215.6/sq mi)
- Time zone: UTC+01:00 (CET)
  - Summer (DST): UTC+02:00 (CEST)
- INSEE/Postal code: 56249 /56800
- ^{1} French Land Register data, which excludes lakes, ponds, glaciers > 1 km^{2} (0.386 sq mi or 247 acres) and river estuaries.

Taupont (French pronunciation: [topɔ̃]; Breton: Talbont) is a commune in the Morbihan department of Brittany in north-western France. Inhabitants of Taupont are called in French Taupontais.

== Population ==
Historical population
Year	Pop.	±% p.a.
1968	1,418	—
1975	1,453	+0.35%
1982	1,648	+1.82%
1990	1,853	+1.48%
1999	1,908	+0.33%
2007	2,116	+1.30%
2012	2,195	+0.74%
2017	2,198	+0.03%
2023	2,428	+1.67%
Source: INSEE

== See also ==
- Communes of the Morbihan department
