= Helléan =

Commune in Brittany, France

Helléan Helean
- Commune
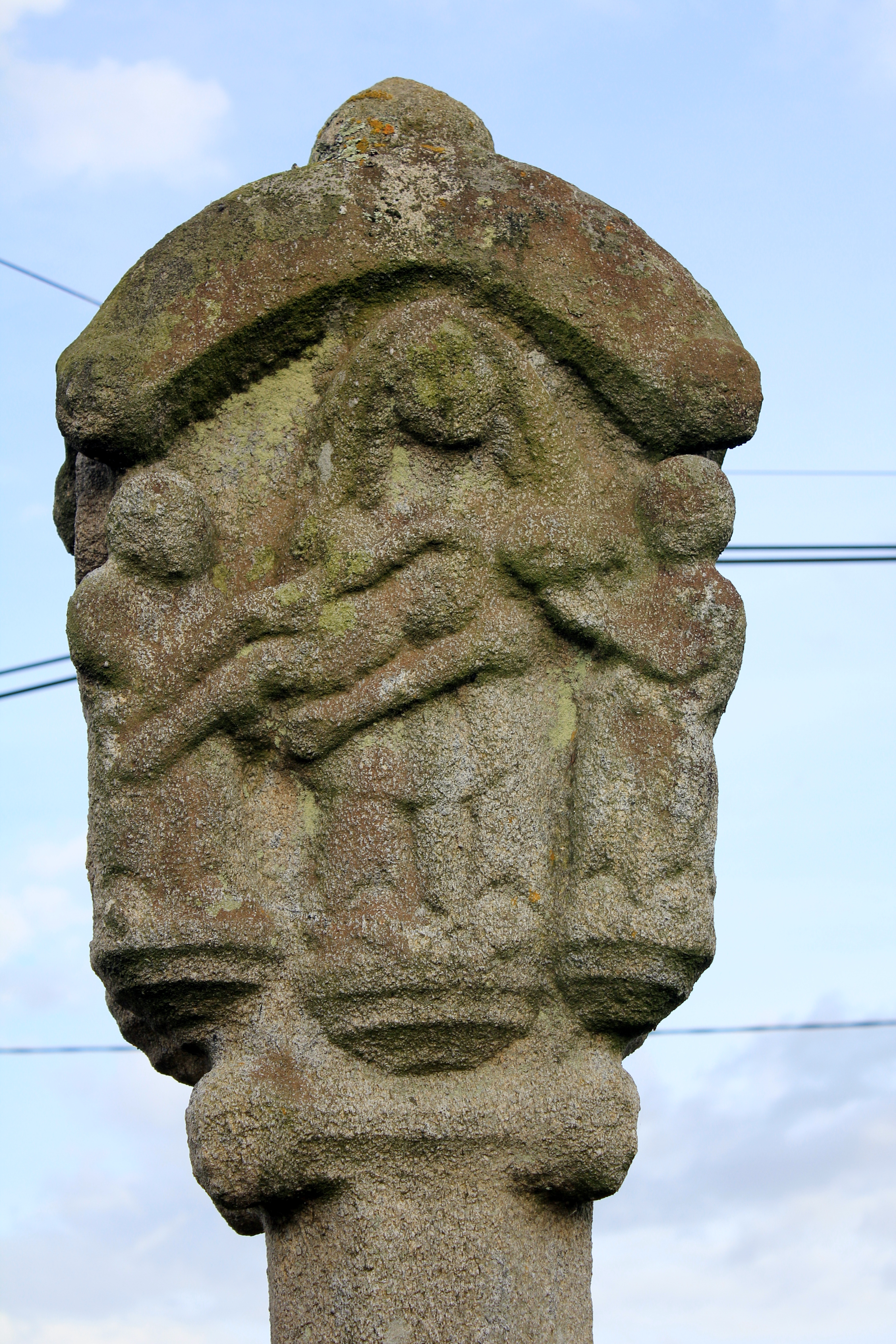
- The Cross of Penlan
- Location of Helléan
- Location within France Location within Brittany
- Coordinates: 47°58′19″N 2°28′20″W
- Country: France
- Region: Brittany
- Department: Morbihan
- Arrondissement: Pontivy
- Canton: Ploërmel
- Intercommunality: Ploërmel Communauté

Government
  - Mayor (2026–32): Jean-Jacques Maley
- Area^{1}: 7.87 km^{2} (3.04 sq mi)
- Highest elevation: 89 m (292 ft)
- Lowest elevation: 30 m (98 ft)
- Population (2023): 395
  - Density: 50.2/km^{2} (130/sq mi)
- Time zone: UTC+01:00 (CET)
  - Summer (DST): UTC+02:00 (CEST)
- INSEE/Postal code: 56082 /56120
- ^{1} French Land Register data, which excludes lakes, ponds, glaciers > 1 km^{2} (0.386 sq mi or 247 acres) and river estuaries.

Helléan (French pronunciation: [eleɑ̃]; Breton: Helean) is a commune in the Morbihan department of Brittany in north-western France. Inhabitants of Helléan are called in French Helléanais.

== See also ==
- Communes of the Morbihan department
