= Lanvénégen =

Commune in Brittany, France

Lanvénégen Lannejenn
- Commune
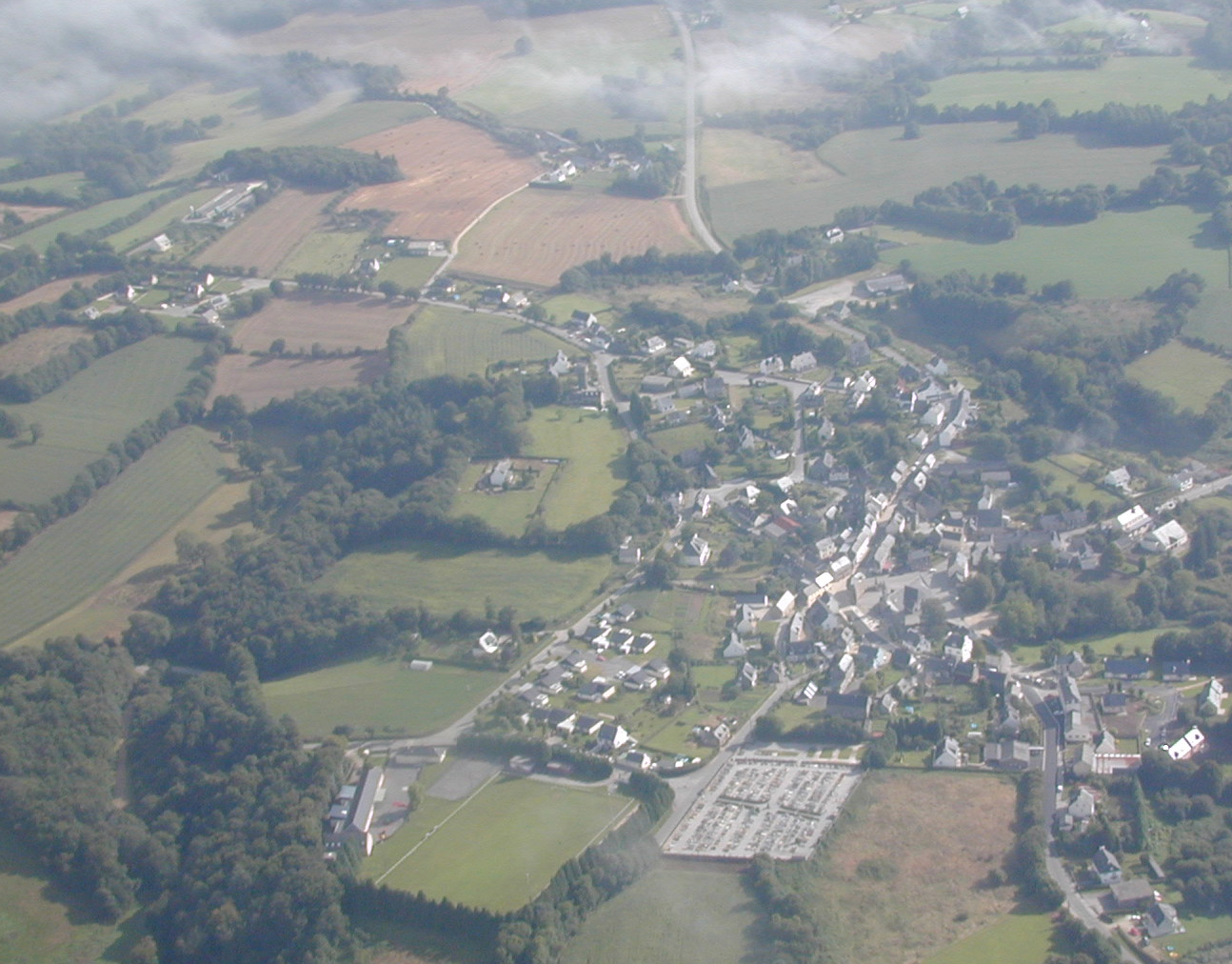
- An aerial view of Lanvénégen
- Location of Lanvénégen
- Location within France Location within Brittany
- Coordinates: 47°59′56″N 3°32′25″W
- Country: France
- Region: Brittany
- Department: Morbihan
- Arrondissement: Pontivy
- Canton: Gourin
- Intercommunality: Roi Morvan Communauté

Government
  - Mayor (2026–32): Monique Le Cren
- Area^{1}: 29.42 km^{2} (11.36 sq mi)
- Highest elevation: 188 m (617 ft)
- Lowest elevation: 52 m (171 ft)
- Population (2023): 1,145
  - Density: 38.92/km^{2} (100.8/sq mi)
- Time zone: UTC+01:00 (CET)
  - Summer (DST): UTC+02:00 (CEST)
- INSEE/Postal code: 56105 /56320
- ^{1} French Land Register data, which excludes lakes, ponds, glaciers > 1 km^{2} (0.386 sq mi or 247 acres) and river estuaries.

Lanvénégen (French pronunciation: [lɑ̃veneʒɛ̃]; Breton: Lannejenn) is a commune in the Morbihan department of Brittany in north-western France.

== Geography ==
Historically, Lanvénégen belongs to Cornouaille. The village centre is located 31 km (19 mi) north-west of Lorient and 42 km (26 mi) east of Quimper. The river Ellé forms the eastern border of the commune. Apart from the village centre, there are about eighty hamlets. Most of the hamlets consist of two or three houses but others are larger like the villages of Vetveur, Lanzonnet and Quinquis.

=== Neighbouring communes ===
Lanvénégen is border by Meslan to east, by Le Faouët to north, by Guiscriff to west and by Querrien to south.

== Demographics ==
Inhabitants of Lanvénégen are called in French Lanvénégenois. Lanvénégen's population peaked at 2,790 in 1926 and declined to 1,145 in 2023. This represents a 59% decrease in total population since the peak census figure.

Historical population

Year	Pop.	±% p.a.
1793	1,413	—
1800	1,408	−0.05%
1806	1,473	+0.76%
1821	1,606	+0.58%
1831	1,690	+0.51%
1836	1,858	+1.91%
1841	1,770	−0.97%
1846	1,797	+0.30%
1851	1,961	+1.76%
1856	1,893	−0.70%
1861	1,896	+0.03%
1866	1,942	+0.48%
1872	1,827	−1.01%
1876	1,979	+2.02%
1881	2,092	+1.12%
1886	2,155	+0.60%
1891	2,234	+0.72%
1896	2,322	+0.78%
1901	2,510	+1.57%

Year	Pop.	±% p.a.
1906	2,651	+1.10%
1911	2,715	+0.48%
1921	2,693	−0.08%
1926	2,790	+0.71%
1931	2,744	−0.33%
1936	2,450	−2.24%
1946	2,310	−0.59%
1954	2,033	−1.58%
1962	1,727	−2.02%
1968	1,513	−2.18%
1975	1,330	−1.82%
1982	1,232	−1.09%
1990	1,221	−0.11%
1999	1,180	−0.38%
2007	1,195	+0.16%
2012	1,202	+0.12%
2017	1,165	−0.62%
2023	1,145	−0.29%

Source: EHESS and INSEE (1968–2023)

== Map ==
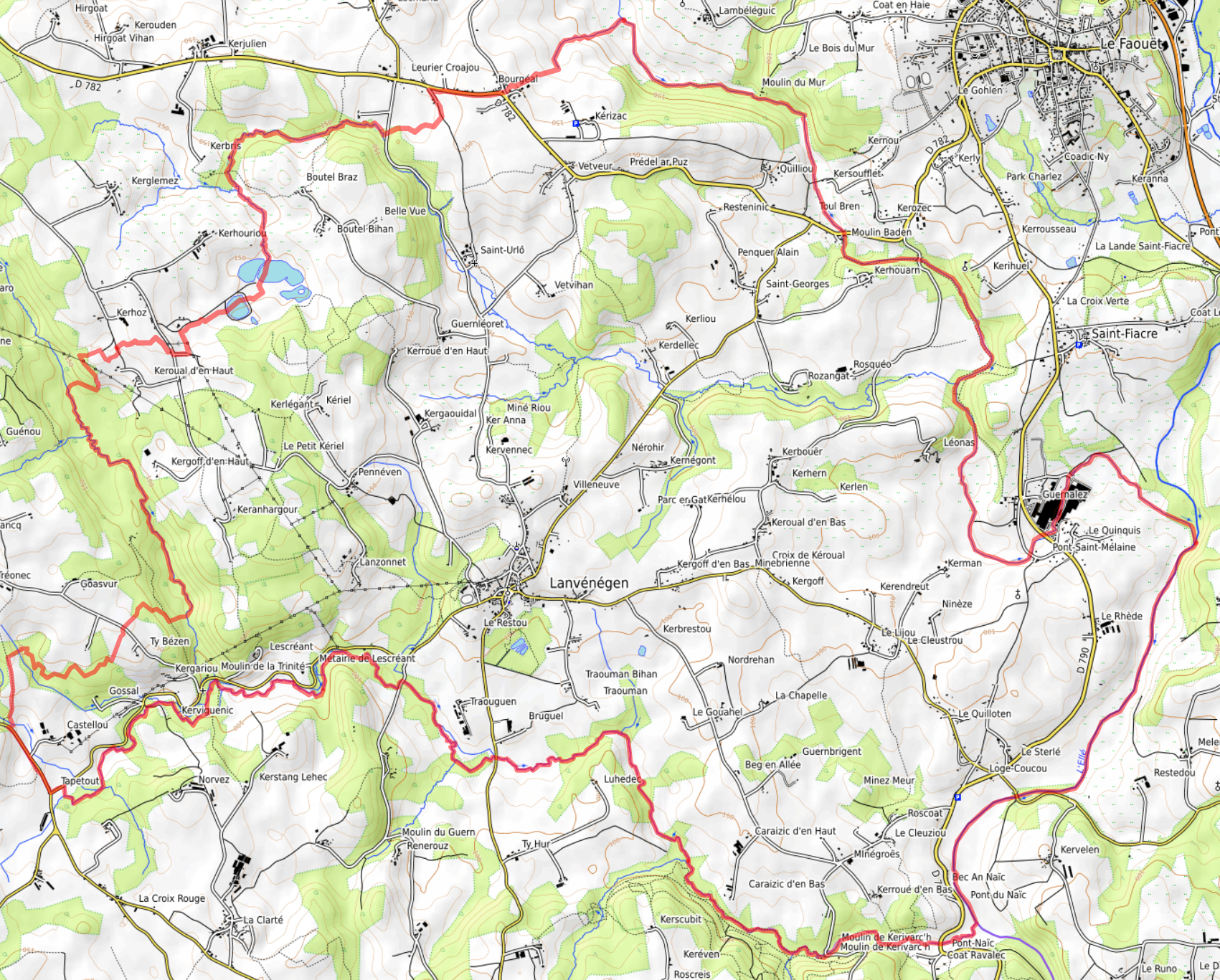
Topographic map

== List of places ==
- Bec an Naic
- Bec en Allée
- Bellevue
- Bourgeal
- Boutel
- Boutel Bihan
- Boutel Bras
- Bruguel (le)
- Caraizic
- Caraizic d'en Bas
- Caraizic d'en Haut
- Castellou
- Chapelle (la)
- Cleustrou
- Cleuziou
- Croix de Keroual
- Croix Neuve
- Douar Roux
- Goahel (le)
- Gossal
- Guernbrigent
- Guernléoret
- Guern Vihan
- Kaolins (les)
- Keranna
- Kerbouer
- Kerbrestou
- Kerdellec
- Kerendreut
- Kerfatic
- Kergaouidal
- Kergariou
- Kergoff d'en Bas
- Kergoff d'en Haut
- Kerhargour
- Kerhellou
- Kerhern
- Kerhouarn
- Keriel
- Kerihuel
- Kerisole
- Kerivarch
- Kerizac
- Kerlégant
- Kerlen
- Kerliou
- Kerman
- Kerminé
- Kernégont
- Keroual d'en Bas
- Keroual d'en Haut
- Keroué d'en Bas
- Keroué d'en Haut
- Kervennec
- Lanzonnet
- Léonas
- Lescréant
- Lijou (le)
- Loge Coucou
- Métairie de Lescréant
- Minébrienne
- Minégroes
- Minéguen
- Minémeur
- Minériou
- Moulin Baden
- Moulin de la Coutume
- Moulin de la Trinité
- Moulin du Pont Lédan
- Moulin du Rest
- Moulin de Lescréant
- Moulin de la Villeneuve
- Ninèze
- Nordrehan,
- Parc er Gat
- Pénéven
- Penquer
- Petit Keriel
- Pont St Melaine
- Prezal Puz
- Quilliou
- Quilloten
- Quinquis
- Resteninic
- Restou
- Rhède (le)
- Roscoat
- Rosquéo
- Rozangat
- Saint Georges
- Saint Melaine (chapel)
- Saint Quijeau
- Saint Urlo,
- Stang Pénéven
- Sterlé (le)
- Toul Bren
- Traouguen
- Traouman
- Ty Bezen
- Vetveur
- Vetvienne
- Villeneuve (la)

== History ==
In 1508, the construction of the current parish church dedicated to Saint Cognogan began. Bertrand du Rusquec, who initiated the work, was its first minister before being appointed rector of Guiscriff in 1514. The oldest surviving parish registers date back to 1637.

== See also ==
- Communes of the Morbihan department
