= La Trinité-Porhoët =

La Trinité-Porhoët An Drinded-Porc'hoed
- Commune
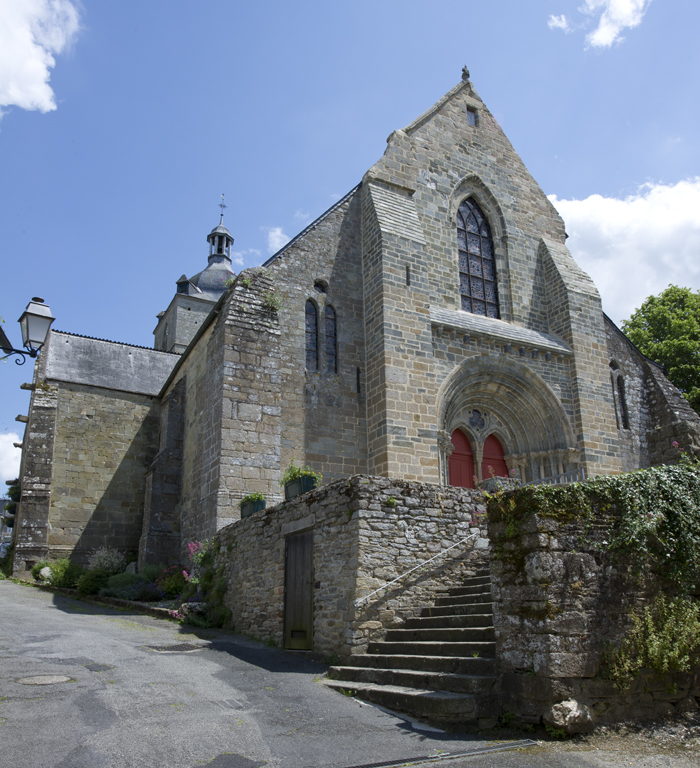
- The church in La Trinité-Porhoët

- Coat of arms
- Location of La Trinité-Porhoët
- Location within France Location within Brittany
- Coordinates: 48°05′57″N 2°32′36″W
- Country: France
- Region: Brittany
- Department: Morbihan
- Arrondissement: Pontivy
- Canton: Ploërmel
- Intercommunality: Ploërmel Communauté

Government
  - Mayor (2026–32): Yannick Le Borgne
- Area^{1}: 12.70 km^{2} (4.90 sq mi)
- Highest elevation: 145 m (476 ft)
- Lowest elevation: 67 m (220 ft)
- Population (2023): 663
  - Density: 52.2/km^{2} (135/sq mi)
- Time zone: UTC+01:00 (CET)
  - Summer (DST): UTC+02:00 (CEST)
- INSEE/Postal code: 56257 /56490
- ^{1} French Land Register data, which excludes lakes, ponds, glaciers > 1 km^{2} (0.386 sq mi or 247 acres) and river estuaries.

La Trinité-Porhoët (French pronunciation: [la tʁinite pɔʁwɛt]; Breton: An Drinded-Porc'hoed) is a commune in the Morbihan department of Brittany in north-western France. Inhabitants of La Trinité-Porhoët are called in French Trinitais.

== See also ==
- Communes of the Morbihan department
