= Mauron =

Commune in Brittany, France

Mauron Maoron
- Commune
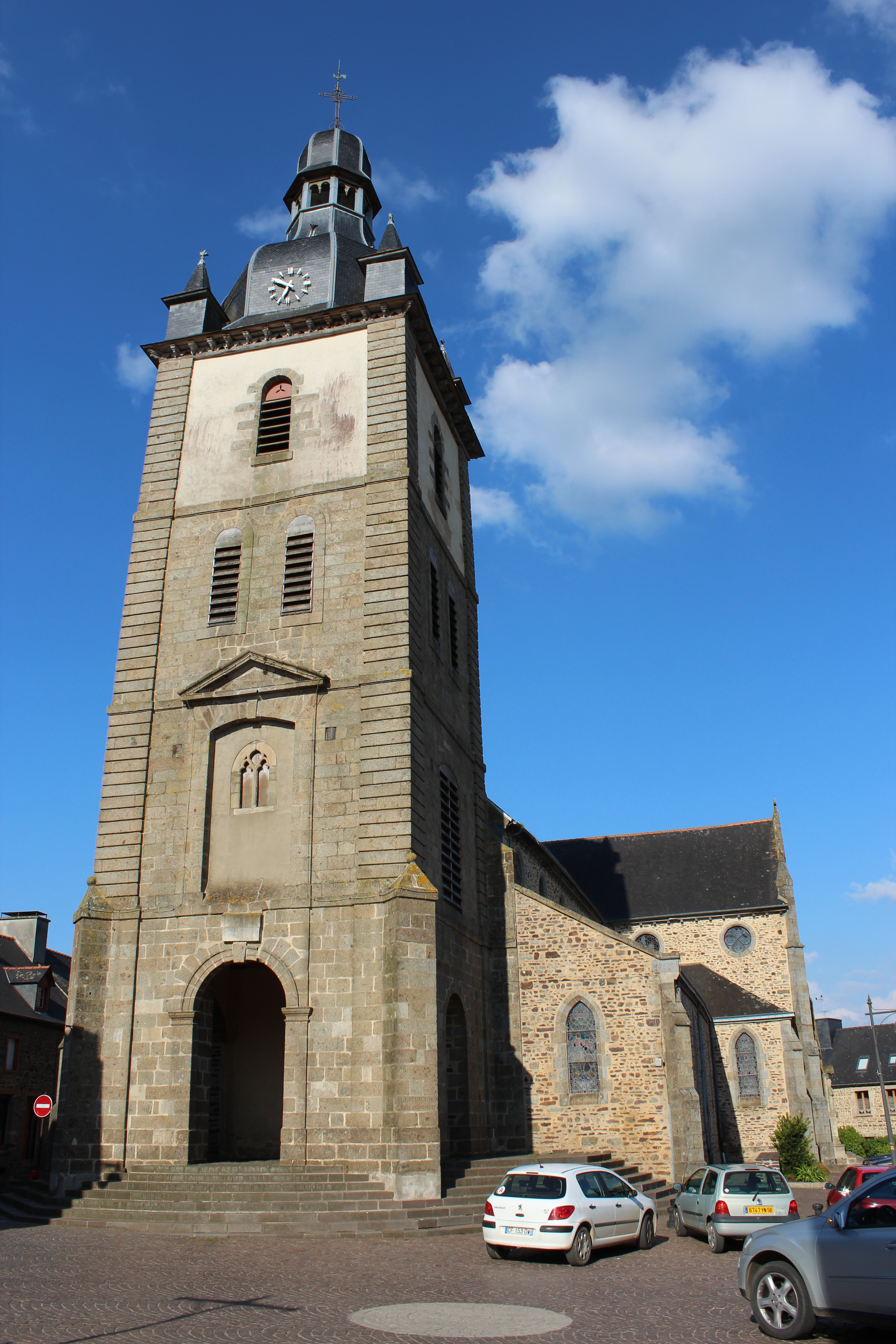
- St Peter's Church in Mauron

- Coat of arms
- Location of Mauron
- Location within France Location within Brittany
- Coordinates: 48°04′59″N 2°17′05″W
- Country: France
- Region: Brittany
- Department: Morbihan
- Arrondissement: Pontivy
- Canton: Ploërmel
- Intercommunality: Ploërmel Communauté

Government
  - Mayor (2026–32): Fabienne Briéro
- Area^{1}: 67.23 km^{2} (25.96 sq mi)
- Highest elevation: 130 m (430 ft)
- Lowest elevation: 47 m (154 ft)
- Population (2023): 3,163
  - Density: 47.05/km^{2} (121.9/sq mi)
- Time zone: UTC+01:00 (CET)
  - Summer (DST): UTC+02:00 (CEST)
- INSEE/Postal code: 56127 /56430
- ^{1} French Land Register data, which excludes lakes, ponds, glaciers > 1 km^{2} (0.386 sq mi or 247 acres) and river estuaries.

Mauron (French pronunciation: [moʁɔ̃]; Breton: Maoron) is a commune in the Morbihan department and Brittany region of north-western France. It lies close to the borders of both Côtes d'Armor and Ille-et-Vilaine. Mauron's location make it a crossroads on the routes connecting Dinan to Vannes and Quimper to Rennes.

== History ==
Aerial archaeology has revealed the existence of a large number of Gaulish farms, attesting to the agricultural wealth of the territory, which is traversed by the Roman road leading from Quimper to Rennes.

Saint Judicaël founded a monastery in the area, at a place called Saint-Léry.

The first historical mention of Mauron dates from 1152. In the eighteenth century, a fair was held here on 28 October each year, the feast of St Simon.

== Battle of Mauron ==
On 14 August 1352 six hundred French Bretons (who supported King John II of France, the protector of Charles of Blois) under the leadership of the marshal of Offemont fought Anglo-Breton troops (supporting the Montfort side) which was led by Gaultier de Genteley (or Venteley, or Benteley). He was assisted by Tanguy du Chastel, Yves Trésiguidy and Garnier de Cadoual. The battle appears to have taken place near the village of Bois-de-la-Roche.

The king's troops lost the battle, and many corpses were left on the field of battle, including those of the marshal of Offemont, the count of Marche, the lords of Bricquebec and Beauvais, Alain VII (11th viscount Rohan), Tinténiac, and a significant number of knights (around 140).

== Population ==
Historical population
Year	Pop.	±% p.a.
1968	3,216	—
1975	3,237	+0.09%
1982	3,365	+0.56%
1990	3,396	+0.11%
1999	3,196	−0.67%
2007	3,134	−0.24%
2012	3,386	+1.56%
2017	3,082	−1.86%
2023	3,163	+0.43%
Source: INSEE

In French the inhabitants of Mauron are known as Mauronnais.

== Breton language ==
In September 2019, 25 of the commune's 179 public primary school pupils were being educated bilingually.

== Sites and Monuments ==
=== Religious ===
- The Church of St Peter.
- The Monastery of l'Action de Grâces, founded by Virginie Danion, a native of Mauron, in 1869. A painting by Alphonse Le Hénaff can be seen in the chapel.
- The 17th-century Chapel of St Anne in the village of Beuve, near the site of a château which was destroyed in 1676.

=== Civil ===
- Château de Boyer
- Château du Ferron
- Château de La Ville-Davy
- Starting-point of the "Voie verte Mauron Questembert" (a footpath running from Mauron to Questembert): an idea formulated by the General Council of Morbihan and opened in 2002. It uses the ancient route of the railway line from La Brohinière to Ploërmel and then the Ploërmel to Questembert line.

== Personalities connected to the commune ==
- The playwright Romain Weingarten (1926–2006) is buried in Mauron, to which he had retired in later life.
- Virginie Danion, founder of the monastery of l'Action de Grâces and sister-in-law of the architect Sigismond Ropartz,

== Twin towns ==
Mauron is twinned with the town of Newmarket in Ireland.

== See also ==
- Communes of the Morbihan department
