= La Grée-Saint-Laurent =

Commune in Brittany, France

La Grée-Saint-Laurent Ar C'hrav-Sant-Laorañs
- Commune
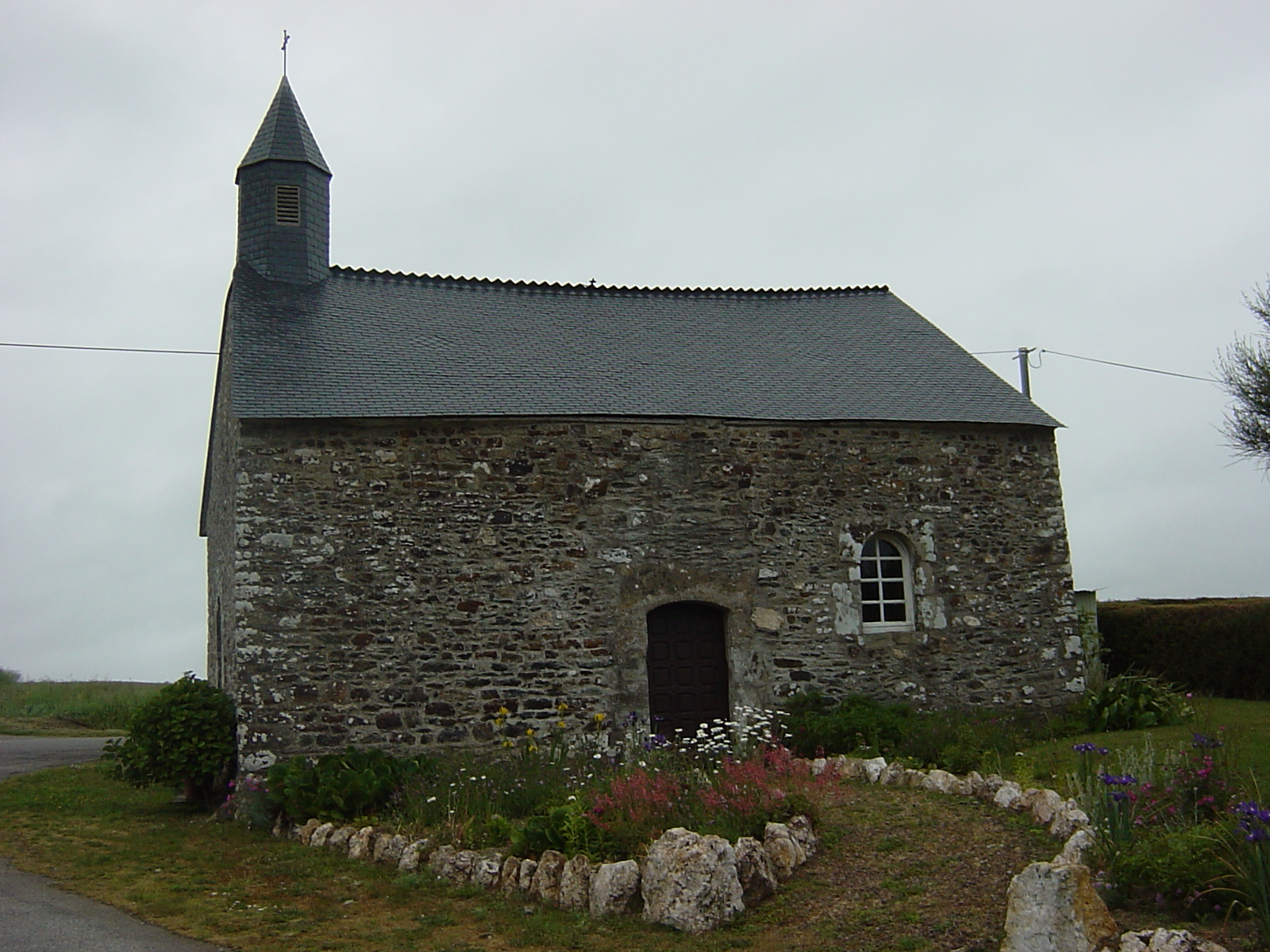
- The chapel of Saint-Sébastien

- Coat of arms
- Location of La Grée-Saint-Laurent
- Location within France Location within Brittany
- Coordinates: 47°59′46″N 2°29′52″W
- Country: France
- Region: Brittany
- Department: Morbihan
- Arrondissement: Pontivy
- Canton: Ploërmel
- Intercommunality: Ploërmel Communauté

Government
  - Mayor (2024–2026): Martine Gouedo
- Area^{1}: 7.90 km^{2} (3.05 sq mi)
- Highest elevation: 117 m (384 ft)
- Lowest elevation: 40 m (130 ft)
- Population (2023): 304
  - Density: 38.5/km^{2} (99.7/sq mi)
- Time zone: UTC+01:00 (CET)
  - Summer (DST): UTC+02:00 (CEST)
- INSEE/Postal code: 56068 /56120
- ^{1} French Land Register data, which excludes lakes, ponds, glaciers > 1 km^{2} (0.386 sq mi or 247 acres) and river estuaries.

La Grée-Saint-Laurent (French pronunciation: [la gʁe sɛ̃ loʁɑ̃]; Breton: Ar C'hrav-Sant-Laorañs) is a commune in the Morbihan department of Brittany in north-western France. Inhabitants of La Grée-Saint-Laurent are called Laurentais.

== See also ==
- Communes of the Morbihan department
