= Campénéac =

Commune in Brittany, France

Campénéac Kempenieg
- Commune
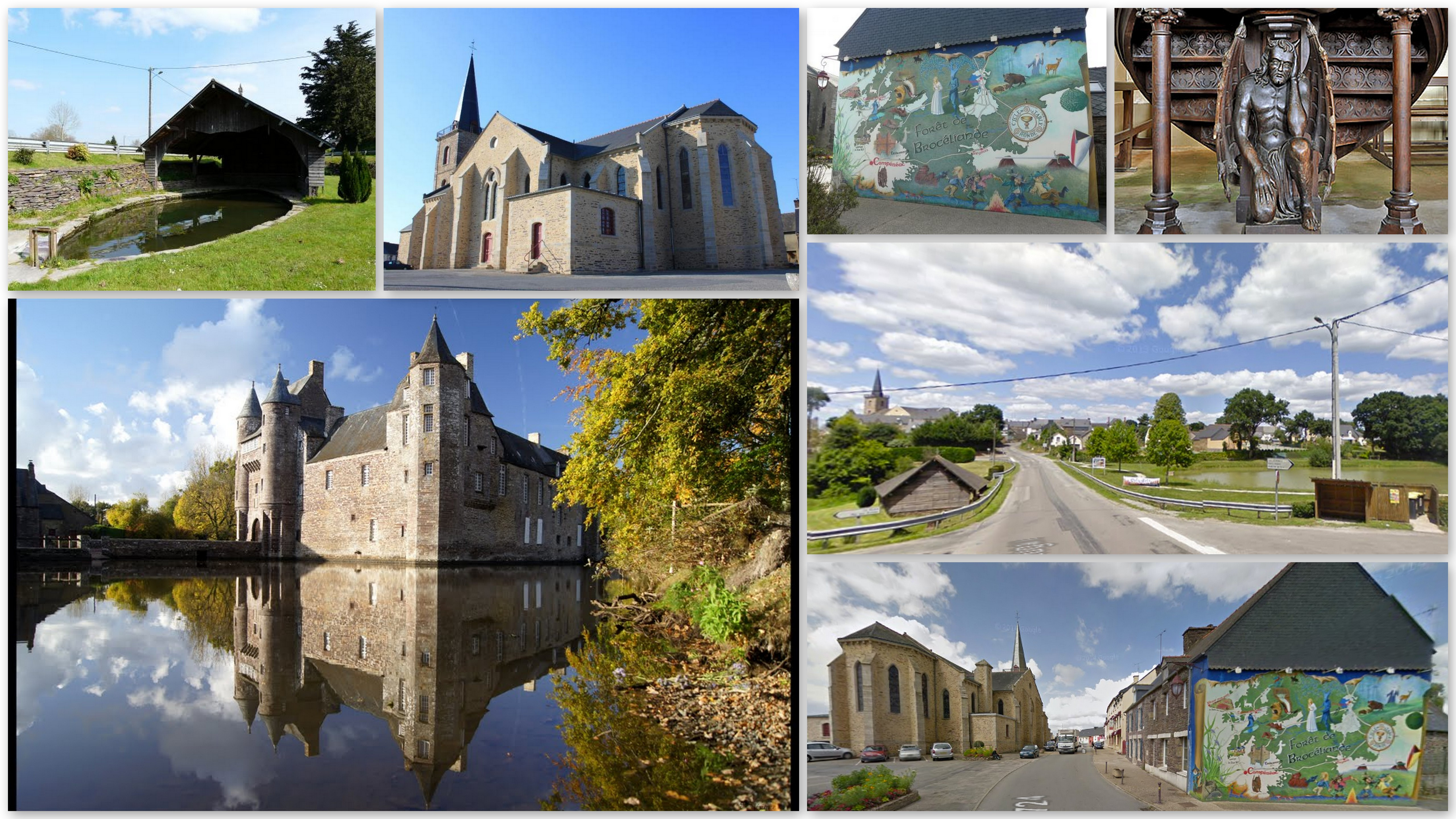
- Clockwise from upper left: old lavoir; Church of Our Lady; mural of Paimpont forest; carved demon supporting the church pulpit; street views of the commune; Château de Trécesson

- Coat of arms
- Location of Campénéac
- Location within France Location within Brittany
- Coordinates: 47°57′30″N 2°17′36″W
- Country: France
- Region: Brittany
- Department: Morbihan
- Arrondissement: Pontivy
- Canton: Ploërmel
- Intercommunality: Ploërmel

Government
  - Mayor (2026–32): Hania Renaudie
- Area^{1}: 60.57 km^{2} (23.39 sq mi)
- Highest elevation: 216 m (709 ft)
- Lowest elevation: 46 m (151 ft)
- Population (2023): 1,991
  - Density: 32.87/km^{2} (85.14/sq mi)
- Time zone: UTC+01:00 (CET)
  - Summer (DST): UTC+02:00 (CEST)
- INSEE/Postal code: 56032 /56800
- ^{1} French Land Register data, which excludes lakes, ponds, glaciers > 1 km^{2} (0.386 sq mi or 247 acres) and river estuaries.

Campénéac (French pronunciation: [kɑ̃peneak]; Breton: Kempenieg) is a commune in the Morbihan department of Brittany in north-western France. Inhabitants of Campénéac are called in French Campénéacois.
