= Guillac, Morbihan =

Commune in Brittany, France

Guillac Gilieg
- Commune
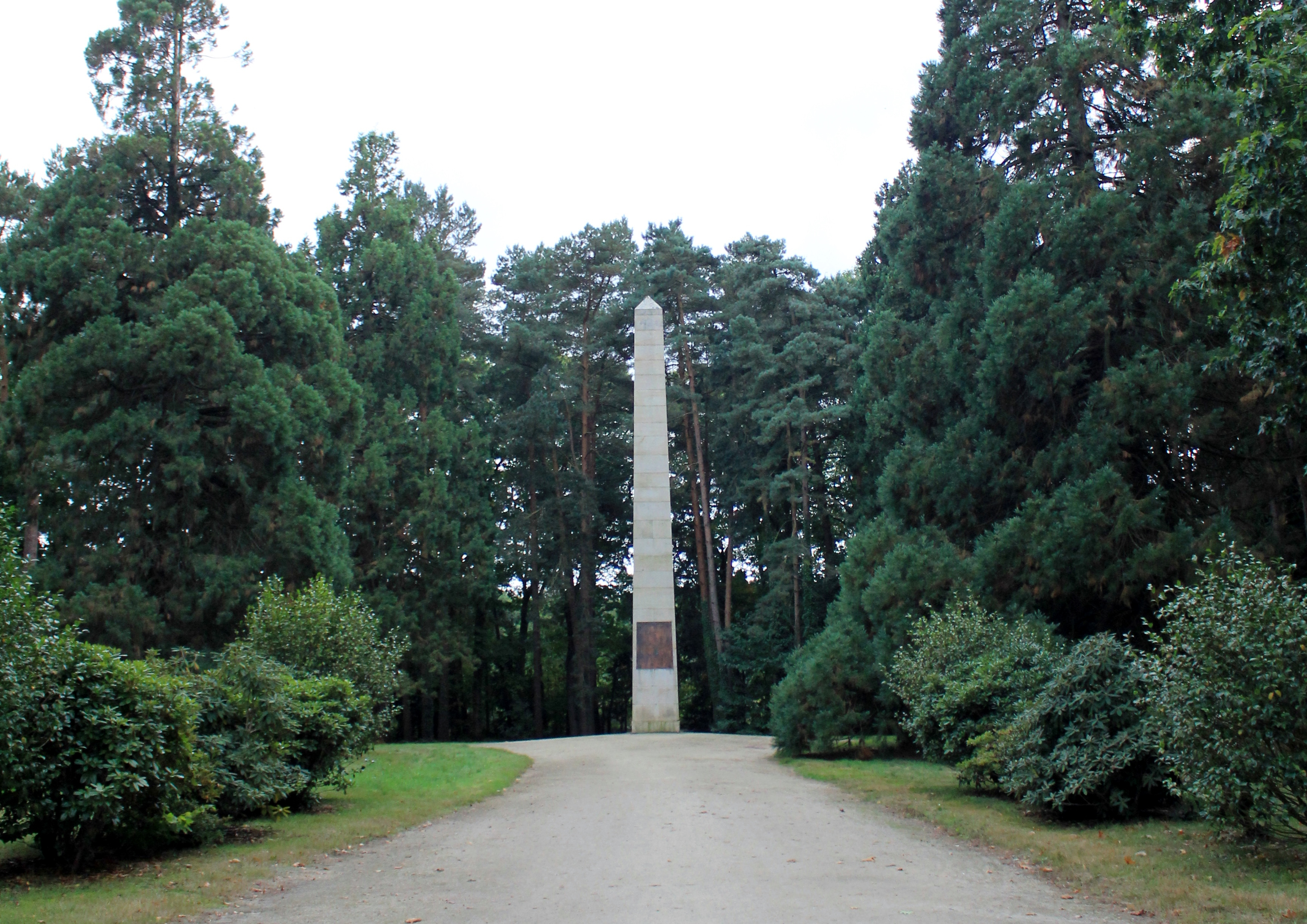
- The Colonne des Trente
- Location of Guillac
- Location within France Location within Brittany
- Coordinates: 47°54′41″N 2°27′53″W
- Country: France
- Region: Brittany
- Department: Morbihan
- Arrondissement: Pontivy
- Canton: Ploërmel
- Intercommunality: Ploërmel Communauté

Government
  - Mayor (2026–32): Thérèse Mainguy
- Area^{1}: 21.83 km^{2} (8.43 sq mi)
- Highest elevation: 91 m (299 ft)
- Lowest elevation: 19 m (62 ft)
- Population (2023): 1,396
  - Density: 63.95/km^{2} (165.6/sq mi)
- Time zone: UTC+01:00 (CET)
  - Summer (DST): UTC+02:00 (CEST)
- INSEE/Postal code: 56079 /56800
- ^{1} French Land Register data, which excludes lakes, ponds, glaciers > 1 km^{2} (0.386 sq mi or 247 acres) and river estuaries.

Guillac (French pronunciation: [ɡijak]; Breton: Gilieg) is a commune in the Morbihan department of Brittany in north-western France. Inhabitants of Guillac are called Guillacois.

== See also ==
- Communes of the Morbihan department
