= Brignac, Morbihan =

Commune in Brittany, France

Brignac Brennieg
- Commune
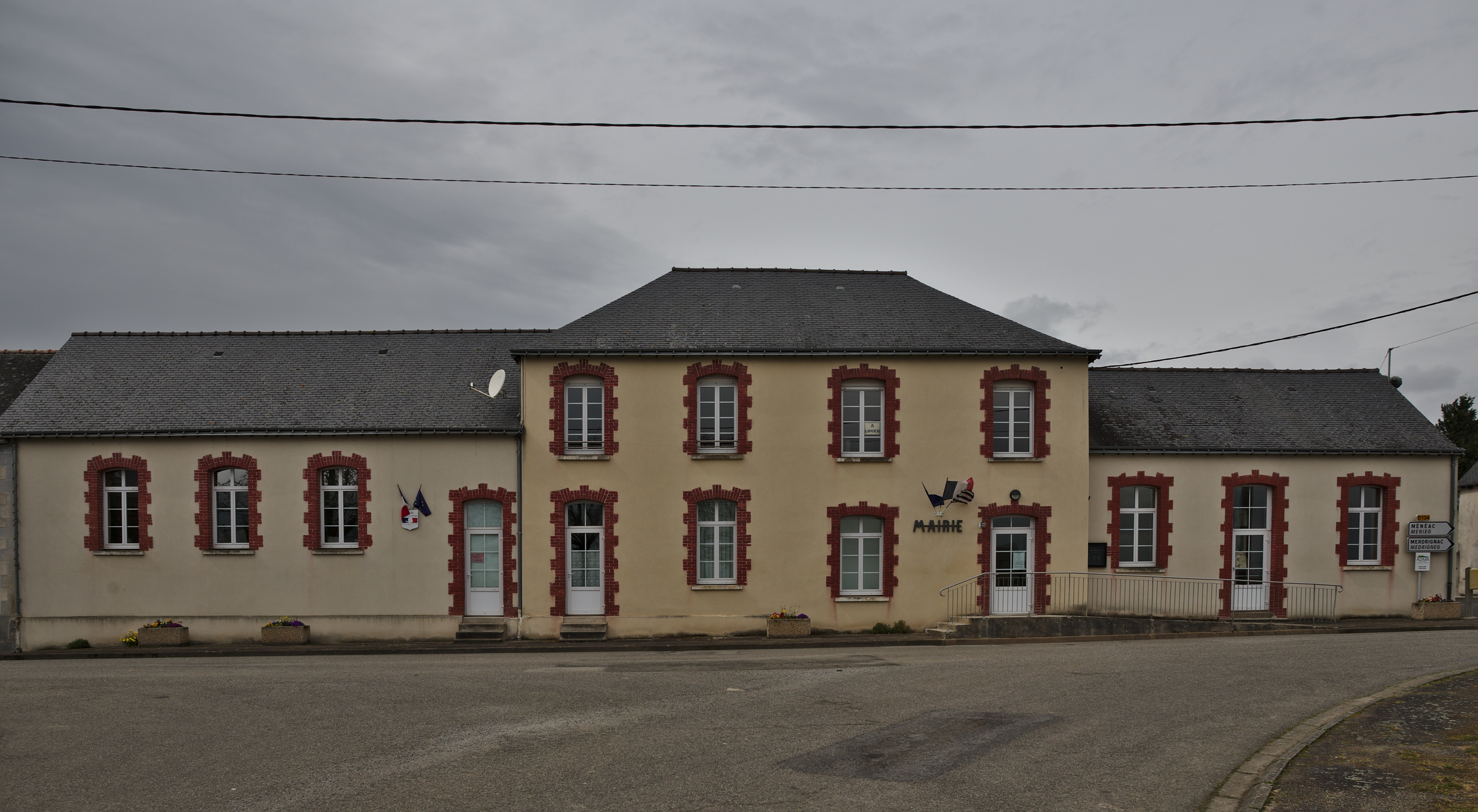
- Town hall

- Coat of arms
- Location of Brignac
- Location within France Location within Brittany
- Coordinates: 48°07′18″N 2°23′13″W
- Country: France
- Region: Brittany
- Department: Morbihan
- Arrondissement: Pontivy
- Canton: Ploërmel
- Intercommunality: Ploërmel Communauté

Government
  - Mayor (2026–32): Armelle Ridard
- Area^{1}: 13.12 km^{2} (5.07 sq mi)
- Highest elevation: 126 m (413 ft)
- Lowest elevation: 68 m (223 ft)
- Population (2023): 200
  - Density: 15/km^{2} (39/sq mi)
- Time zone: UTC+01:00 (CET)
  - Summer (DST): UTC+02:00 (CEST)
- INSEE/Postal code: 56025 /56430
- ^{1} French Land Register data, which excludes lakes, ponds, glaciers > 1 km^{2} (0.386 sq mi or 247 acres) and river estuaries.

Brignac (French pronunciation: [bʁiɲak]; Breton: Brennieg) is a commune in the Morbihan department of Brittany in northwestern France.

== Population ==
Inhabitants of Brignac are called Brignacois in French.

== See also ==
- Communes of the Morbihan department
