= Saint-Léry =

Saint-Léry Sant-Leri
- Commune
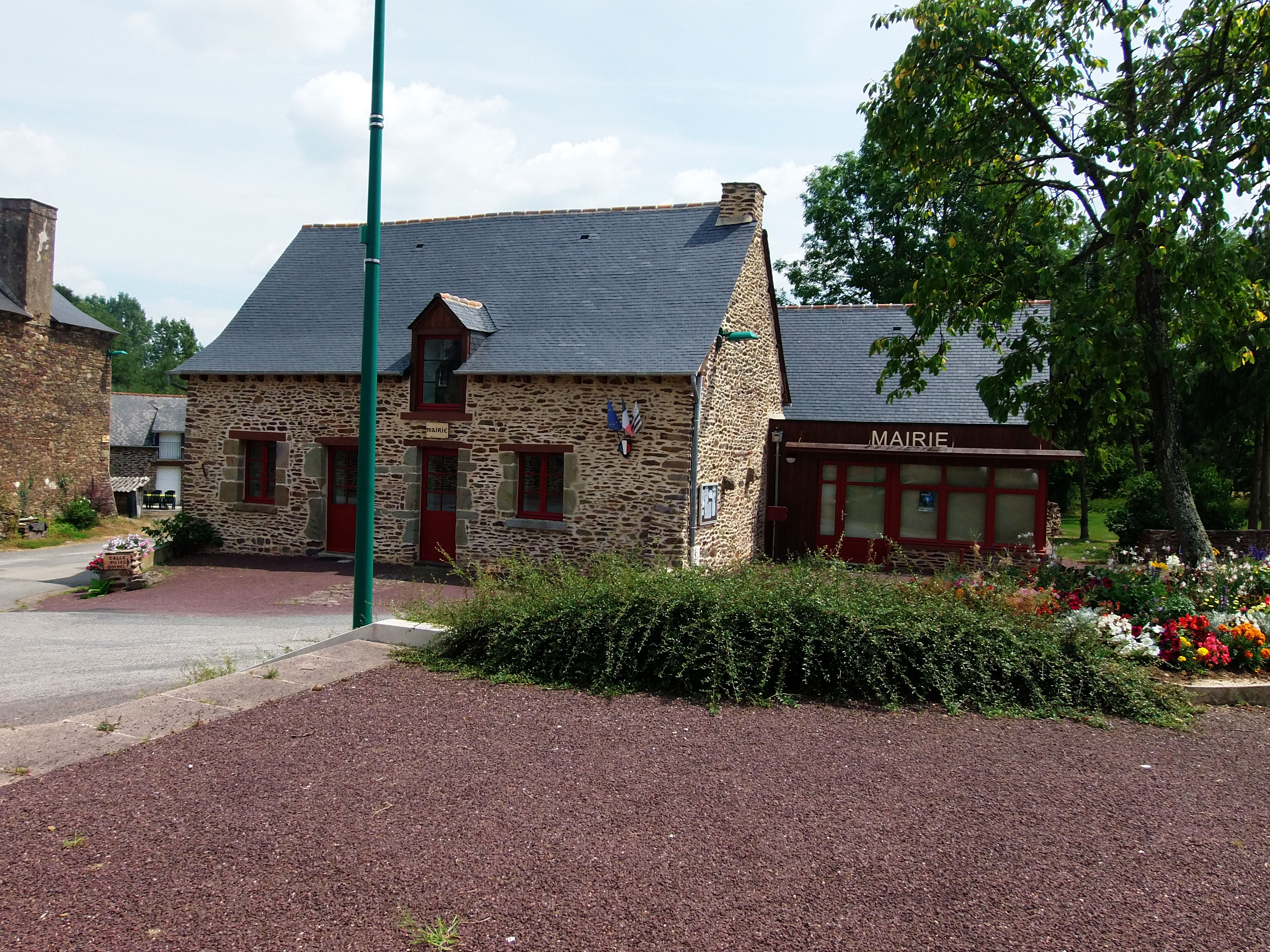
- The town hall in Saint-Léry
- Location of Saint-Léry
- Location within France Location within Brittany
- Coordinates: 48°05′27″N 2°15′17″W
- Country: France
- Region: Brittany
- Department: Morbihan
- Arrondissement: Pontivy
- Canton: Ploërmel
- Intercommunality: Ploërmel Communauté

Government
  - Mayor (2026–32): Daniel Manenc
- Area^{1}: 1.58 km^{2} (0.61 sq mi)
- Highest elevation: 89 m (292 ft)
- Lowest elevation: 58 m (190 ft)
- Population (2023): 210
  - Density: 130/km^{2} (340/sq mi)
- Time zone: UTC+01:00 (CET)
  - Summer (DST): UTC+02:00 (CEST)
- INSEE/Postal code: 56225 /56430
- ^{1} French Land Register data, which excludes lakes, ponds, glaciers > 1 km^{2} (0.386 sq mi or 247 acres) and river estuaries.

Saint-Léry (French pronunciation: [sɛ̃ leʁi]; Breton: Sant-Leri) is a commune in the Morbihan department of Brittany in north-western France. Inhabitants of Saint-Léry are called in French Saint-Léritins or Léritins.

== See also ==
- Communes of the Morbihan department
