= Canton of Ploërmel =

Coordinates: 47.93°N 2.40°W

The canton of Ploërmel is an administrative division of the Morbihan department, northwestern France. Its borders were modified at the French canton reorganisation which came into effect in March 2015. Its seat is in Ploërmel.

It consists of the following communes:

1. Brignac
2. Campénéac
3. Concoret
4. La Croix-Helléan
5. Cruguel
6. Évriguet
7. Forges de Lanouée
8. Gourhel
9. La Grée-Saint-Laurent
10. Guégon
11. Guillac
12. Guilliers
13. Helléan
14. Josselin
15. Lantillac
16. Loyat
17. Mauron
18. Ménéac
19. Mohon
20. Montertelot
21. Néant-sur-Yvel
22. Ploërmel
23. Saint-Brieuc-de-Mauron
24. Saint-Léry
25. Saint-Malo-des-Trois-Fontaines
26. Saint-Servant
27. Taupont
28. Tréhorenteuc
29. La Trinité-Porhoët
