= List of windmills in Morbihan =

A list of windmills in Morbihan, France.

| Location | Name of mill | Type | Built | Notes | Photograph |
|---|---|---|---|---|---|
| Allaire | Moulin de Brancheleux | Moulin Tour | | | |
| Ambon | Moulin de Bilion | Moulin Tour | 1746 | Moulins-a-Vent (in French) | |
| Arradon | Moulin de Kerbélec | Moulin Tour | | Moulins-a-Vent (in French) | |
| Arzal | Moulin de Kerdavid | Moulin Tour | | Moulins-a-Vent (in French) | |
| Arzal | Moulin de Kervero | Moulin Tour | | Moulins-a-Vent (in French) | |
| Arzal | Moulin de Lantiern No. 1 | Moulin Tour | | Moulins-a-Vent (in French) | |
| Arzal | Moulin de Lantiern No. 2 | Moulin Tour | | Moulins-a-Vent (in French) | |
| Arzal | Moulin Neuf | | | | |
| Arzal | Moulin de Séréac | | | | |
| Augan | Moulin de Coetquidan | Moulin Tour | | Moulins-a-Vent (in French) | |
| Baden | Moulin le Lano | Moulin Tour | | Moulins-a-Vent (in French) | |
| Baden | Moulin Neuf | Moulin Tour | | Moulins-a-Vent (in French) | |
| Bangor | Moulin de Varrech | Moulin Tour | | Moulins-a-Vent (in French) | |
| CampénéacBelleville Lamiré | Moulin du | Moulin Tour | | | |
| Carnac | Moulin de Kermario | Moulin Tour | | Moulins-a-Vent (in French) | |
| Carnac | Moulin de Larmor | Moulin Tour | | | |
| Cruguel | Moulin des Timbrieux | Moulin Tour | 17th century | Moulins-a-Vent (in French) | |
| Damgan | Moulin de Kervoyal | Moulin Tour | | Moulins-a-Vent (in French) | |
| Elven | Moulin de Trute | Moulin Tour | | | |
| Erdeven | Moulin du Narbon en Kerhillio | Moulin Tour | | Moulins-a-Vent (in French) | |
| Guéhenno | Moulin de Guéhenno | Moulin Tour | | Moulins-a-Vent (in French) | |
| Guer | Moulins de Lizan (two mills) | Moulin Tours | | | |
| Île-aux-Moines | | Moulin Tour | | | |
| Île-d'Arz | Moulin de Belure | Moulin Tour | | Moulins-a-Vent (in French) | |
| Île-d'Arz | Moulin de Kernoël | Moulin Tour | | Moulins-a-Vent (in French) | |
| Île d'Houat | | Moulin Tour | | | |
| Larmor-Baden | Moulin a Larmor Baden | Moulin Tour | | Moulins-a-Vent (in French) | |
| Le Palais | Moulin de Borfloc'h | Moulin Tour | | Moulins-a-Vent (in French) | |
| Locmaria | Moulin de Bourhic | Moulin Tour | 1768 | Moulins-a-Vent (in French) | |
| Locmariaquer | Moulin de Toul Y Nis | Moulin Tour | | Moulins-a-Vent (in French) | |
| Lorient | Moulins de Faouëdic (two mills) | Moulin Tour | | | |
| Lorient | | Moulin Tour | | | |
| Marzan | Moulin de l'Amiraulté | Moulin Tour | | | |
| Marzan | Moulin Predit | Moulin Tour | | | |
| Monteneuf | Moulin de Monteneuf | Moulin Tour | | Moulins-a-Vent (in French) | |
| Nivillac | Moulin de Bourigan | Moulin Tour | | | |
| Nivillac | Moulin Bodeuc | Moulin Tour | | | |
| Nivillac | Moulin de St. Cry | Moulin Tour | | | |
| Noyal-Muzillac | | Moulin Tour | | | |
| Plougoumelen | | Moulin Tour | | | |
| Plouharnel | | Moulin Tour | | | |
| Porcaro | Moulin de Malakoff | Moulin Tour | | Moulins-a-Vent (in French) | |
| Saint-Jacut-Les-Pins | Moulin de Saint Jacut | Moulin Tour | | | |
| Saint-Pierre-Quiberon | Moulin à Kerboulevin | Moulin Tour | | Moulins-a-Vent (in French) | |
| Saint-Pierre-Quiberon | | Moulin Tour | | | |
| Sarzeau | Moulin de Quatre Vents | | | | |
| Sarzeau | Moulin de Poulhors #1 | Moulin Tour | | Moulins-a-Vent (in French) | |
| Sarzeau | Moulin de Poulhors #2 | Moulin Tour | | Moulins-a-Vent (in French) | |
| Sarzeau | Moulin de Poulhors #3 | Moulin Tour | | Moulins-a-Vent (in French) | |
| Sauzon | Moulin de Logonnet | Moulin Tour | 1650 | Moulins-a-Vent (in French) | |
| Sauzon | Moulin de Kerzo; Moulin de Mathias | Moulin Tour | | Moulins-a-Vent (in French) | |
| Sauzon | Moulin de Kerlédan | Moulin Tour | | Moulins-a-Vent (in French) | |
| Theix | Moulin de Kérandun | | | | |
