= Pen Lan Point =

Rocky peninsula on the Vilaine estuary in Brittany, France

- Presque-isle
- Pointe de Pen Lan
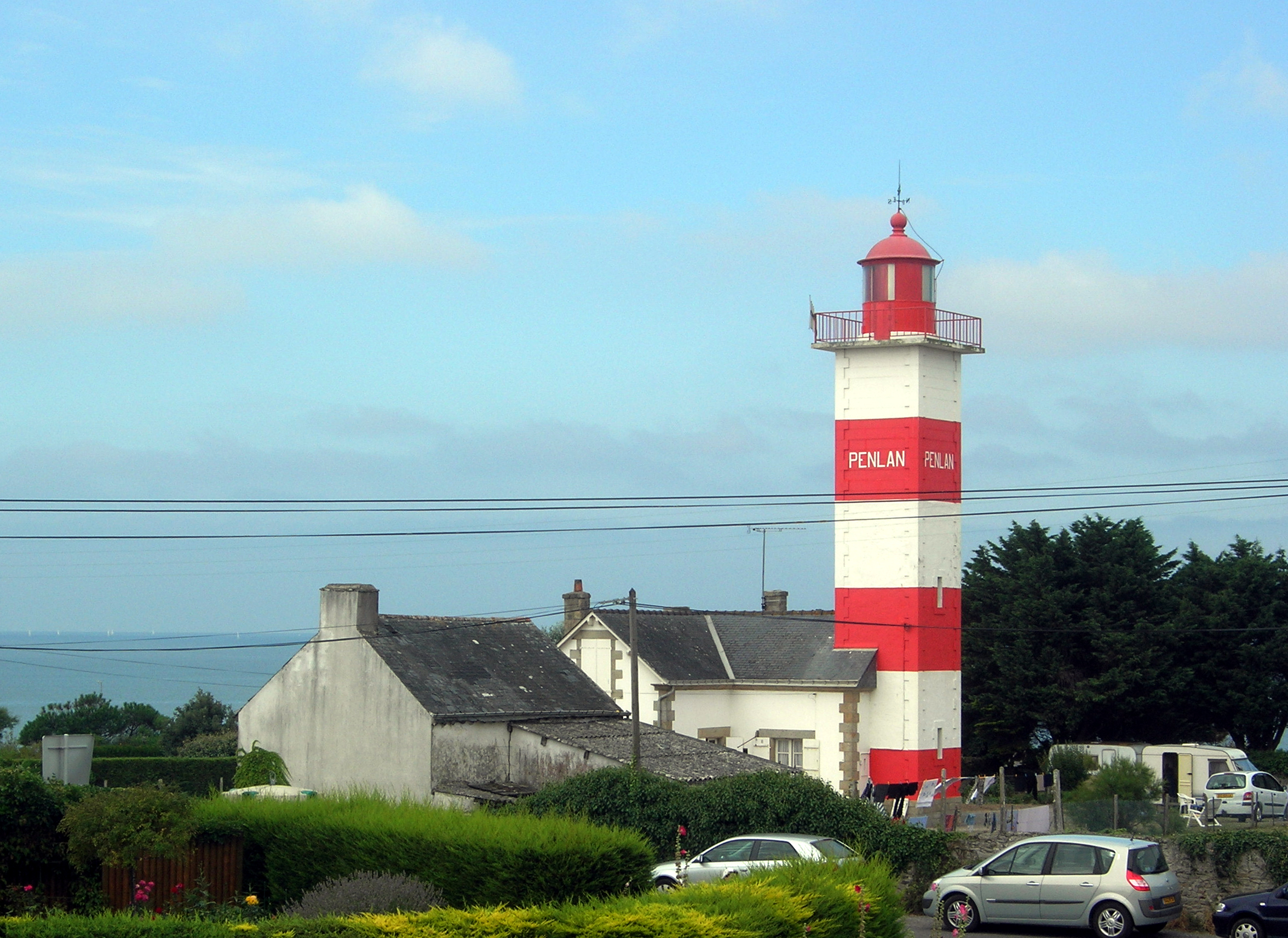
- The Pen Lan lighthouse
- Interactive map of Pen Lan Point
- Coordinates: 47°30′59″N 2°30′04″W
- Location: Brittany, Morbihan
- Water bodies: Estuary of the Vilaine

Pen Lan Point is a rocky peninsula jutting into the Atlantic Ocean, located in the commune of Billiers in Morbihan, France. It marks the northern boundary of the Vilaine estuary and the mouth of the Saint-Éloi River.

== Etymology ==
Pen Lan translates to "point of the heath" in Breton. Thus, referring to it as "the point of Pen Lan" is a pleonasm.

== History ==
The earliest signs of settlement in the Billiers area—two dolmens—date back to the Neolithic period, or "New Stone Age," between approximately 4500 and 2000 BCE.

In the past, the parish church of Billiers was encircled by a cemetery, which was decommissioned in 1939 and leveled in 1956 to create a parking lot. During the excavation, unusually large bones were uncovered in the deeper layers, differing from the typical physique of the region's inhabitants. It was deduced that these might be the remains of Normans who settled at Pen Lan in the 9th century.

The rocks of the point bear witness once more to the passage of drakkars in 919. Led by Bjarnhard, known as "Strong as a Bear," the Viking chief ascended the river and chose to settle on a rocky promontory about 16 kilometers (10 mi) from the estuary mouth, a site that would later become the town of La Roche-Bernard.

=== Fort of Pen Lan ===
Cardinal Richelieu, minister to King Louis XIII and governor of the province from 1631, addressed Brittany's coastal vulnerability by establishing a militia tasked with defending the shoreline. Each seaside parish was required to provide armed men and build guardhouses to shelter them. Consequently, small stone structures proliferated along the Breton coast. Pen Lan Point, extending into the Vilaine estuary, was an ideal location for monitoring the river's entrance and, if necessary, protecting or blocking access depending on the situation. As a result, the "Pennelan guardhouse," referenced in a 17th-century text, was constructed on the rocks at the Vilaine's mouth, a site later known as Roche-Vilaine. Facing the ocean, it housed coastguards who took turns watching ships passing offshore. At the slightest alert, a signal was raised on a mast, and news of an attack was relayed along the coast from guardhouse to guardhouse.

The "Pennelan" guardhouse observed numerous enemy vessels drawn by the invasion opportunities offered by the nearby river. Yet, it was equipped to resist. Its cannons, aimed at potential foes, deterred any assault. Stone cannonballs rained down on intruders, and the Vilaine's mouth remained well-defended. No enemy landings were recorded throughout the 17th century.

=== Battle of the Cardinals ===
The Battle of Quiberon Bay, also known as the Battle of the Cardinals or the Battle of Monsieur de Conflans, marks a grim chapter in French naval history. On 20 November 1759, the French fleet clashed with the English fleet a few miles from Hoëdic Island, near four rocks called the Cardinals due to their arrangement. During the Seven Years' War, eleven French ships sought refuge at the base of Pen Lan Point's rocks, close to the guardhouse, which was reinforced with additional cannons to repel English vessels.

The French ships gradually entered the Vilaine but remained trapped there for nearly two years.

=== Revolution and Chouannerie ===
During the third Chouannerie, Pen Lan Point was selected by Georges Cadoudal and English minister Windham as the site for a landing of gold, arms, and munitions.

=== 19th century ===
==== Fishing ====
The Pen Lan port lies at the mouth of the Saint-Éloi River, which originates at Pen Mur in Muzillac. It is subject to tides that, decades ago, reached as far as the Penesclus lock—known as "Point of the Lock" in Breton. The protective mole dates to the 19th century, though the port predates it. A 1642 record notes that the Prières abbey's fief extended to the "port and haven of Penlan". In the 19th century, it was described as a small, secure cove sheltered by massive rocks; Billiers owed its modest significance to this port, which offered good beaching and shelter, though entry was challenging in strong southwest gales. At that time, it served mainly for fishing—the primary livelihood of coastal residents—and for loading regionally produced salt and grains.

The chattes' main activity was trawling "à la vache," using a beam trawl dragged sideways, its drift managed by lines at both ends, which could alternate as bow or stern. Fishermen set out daily, staying within three leagues of the coast, occasionally irking sardine fishers who blamed them for depleting stocks. They brought back glass eel (young eel) in spring, sole in summer, brown shrimp in autumn, and ray in winter. Fresh fish were landed at the port and sold in Billiers outside the town hall, with surplus shipped by rail to cities. L. de Serbois notes that around 1864, fishermen pooled their daily catch so all could return home content: neither the empty-handed worried about feeding their children, nor the fortunate felt awkward displaying their haul. This may reflect reality, as Billiers's fishing community was tightly knit. Annually, they held a procession honoring Notre-Dame de la Garde, patroness of sailors: men carried ex-voto on canopies from the church to a Virgin statue erected in 1871 at the village's edge.

Chattes also handled short-haul cabotage, transporting salt and grains up the Vilaine to Redon, and to Rochefort and Tonnay-Charente.

In use since the 18th century, chattes peaked in the early 19th century, with forty registered in Billiers (29 in 1728; 35 in 1793). Chaloupes, more adept at sea, later dominated, per customs records, in the century's latter half. Yet, Pen Lan's port was already waning. By century's end, only about twenty chaloupes remained active. In 1885, seventeen ships entered with 77 tons of assorted goods; 16 departed, three bound overseas, with 549 tons of local products (salt and grains). Offshore fishing, outpaced by industrial methods, followed suit. The last chaloupe, the Saint-Pierre-Saint-Paul, owned by Père Pennedu, was noted around 1934.

Today, a few fishing boats keep the memory of Billiers's chattes alive, though they've vanished, swallowed by Saint-Éloi's mud. No images remain. Chaloupes met a similar fate, but one, the Belle de Vilaine—a unique 1887 lugger-rigged replica—was launched in 1994 at Pen Lan, built by the Pradelle shipyard in Le Croisic. It now offers traditional sailing trips.

Offshore fishing wasn't Pen Lan's only pursuit. Shore fishing has long supplemented coastal diets. During war or scarcity, harvesting oysters, mussels, clams, and shrimp intensified. Prevalent in the 19th century, it persists today. Equinox tides draw crowds armed with boots, baskets, rakes, and nets, prompting gendarmerie oversight to protect the seabed.

==== Salt ====
Salt loaded onto Billiers's chattes and chaloupes was produced at Pen Lan Point's entrance. This marshy area was a princely gift from Duke of Brittany John I to the Prières Abbey he founded. Cistercian monks transformed these unusable lands into 32 hectares (79 acres) of salt marshes. Their peak exploitation came after the French Revolution, when paludiers bought the abbey's holdings, as graphical records only emerge then.

Salt was prized in pre-Revolution Brittany, a "free salt land" exempt from the gabelle tax. In neighboring Anjou, a "high gabelle" region, salt prices soared up to twentyfold, fueling rampant smuggling by faux sauniers. These smugglers bought salt in Brittany, posing as tradesmen, and sold it profitably in taxed regions, risking galley punishment.

The Revolution abolished the gabelle, making salt more accessible. Yet, in 1806, Napoleon reinstated a tax to fund wars, burdening "the poor man's only seasoning." Though uniformly applied, smuggling surged anew. Traffickers swarmed Billiers's salines, overwhelming the customs post at Pen Lan's entrance. Gabelous (customs officers, nicknamed despite the gabelle's end) struggled to curb it, patrolling by horse, foot, or a small customs boat in the port. In September 1806, a clash in the marshes killed a tailor from Le Guerno seeking salt, with three others arrested and soon released.

Billiers's salt marshes were famed for salt and healing properties. An 1892 text notes the coast road was lined with salt lagoons, followed by renowned marshes: their salty grass reportedly cured equine and cattle ailments, drawing afflicted animals from afar.

Salt production lasted in Billiers until the 1930s. Outcompeted by Salins du Midi and imports, paludiers abandoned maintenance, and the salines faded, as at Ambon and Guérande.

=== World War II ===
During World War II, as his forces focused eastward, Adolf Hitler ordered an impregnable western rampart, fearing an Allied landing that could divert troops from Russia. In 1941, he proposed the "Atlantic Wall," entrusting Fritz Todt—engineer of the Siegfried Line—with its construction. Leading a paramilitary group answerable only to Hitler, Todt's labor needs were vast, employing up to 1,500,000 workers by 1944: volunteers, STO laborers, prisoners, and deportees, often in brutal conditions, to create a sea barrier.

Initially, German naval artillery occupied old Atlantic guard posts, including Kervoyal (Damgan), Pen Lan (Billiers), and Halguen (Pénestin) at the Vilaine's mouth.

From 1941 to 1943, efforts focused on Brest, Lorient, and Saint-Nazaire ports, building U-boat bases to dominate the Atlantic. Hitler deemed these ports critical, to be defended to the last man.

After securing these, Todt's organization erected thousands of concrete structures. Stretching over 4,000 kilometers (2,500 mi) from northern Norway to the Bidassoa River on the France-Spain border, the Atlantic Wall consumed nearly a million tons of steel and fifteen million cubic meters of concrete in two years.

The Vilaine was no exception. At Pen Lan, the entire point was fortified. A Service historique de la Défense report notes the Vilaine's mouth is bounded north by Pen Lan Point, topped by a lighthouse. Between the keeper's house and the southern tip, a defensive structure lines the shore (likely the guardhouse and powder magazine). Two main fortified zones emerged: one at the current Rochevilaine estate and another beneath a villa opposite the lighthouse, once Charles Geniaux's home.

Rochevilaine Estate Zone

The Saint-Quentin family, 1921 owners, described a smuggler's tunnel from the sea to the lighthouse, passing under the modern Rochevilaine estate, partly collapsed near the lighthouse. Germans reused this still-visible tunnel.

Upon occupation, a square house stood where the old fort was, serving as lodging, surrounded by prior fortifications. They added a Regelbau R 501b—an air-raid shelter with a meeting room, foldable bed, heating, and anti-gas ventilation—concreted in 1943 alongside the tunnel.

An Ob Flak FK 235 atop an MG stand faced the Vilaine's mouth, with a pillbox, mounting a 7.5 cm (3.0 in) anti-aircraft gun. An MG stand, still visible seaside in the masonry beneath the current kitchen, completed this.

A Regelbau 667b with a 5 cm (2.0 in) gun guarded toward Kervoyal Point and Betahon Bay but was dynamited by Dr. Liegeois for a pool. Another 667b, facing the Vilaine's mouth, faded into Henris Dresch's masonry, its outline hinted at in the garden, its roof under Rochevilaine's lawn.

Villa Zone

The requisitioned villa was heavily fortified, with trenches visible into the late 1950s. Originally just the sea-facing block, it housed Germans who fortified it further.

A Geschutztellung—a non-fortified platform—held a 75 mm (3.0 in) Mle 1905 TR cannon (initially Krupp-designed, later Cockerill-assembled in Liège), modified between wars for higher elevation (TRA version). Cooling vats remain on the customs path, used for the gun and horse watering. A Regelbau 134 munitions depot, with two storage rooms and a 90° corridor, shielded against air strikes. A cannon shelter, entry toward the port, allowed quick protection during bombings. Other bunkers exist but lack detail, having been filled in.

Trenches radiated from the villa to lighter cliffside defenses toward the port.

The Tobruk, a small, open-top bunker—nicknamed after Rommel's Siege of Tobruk—housed two crew with MG 34 or MG 42 machine guns. Some were adapted for old or captured tank turrets, often retrofitted with German gear. Renault FT-17 hulks in Billiers, stripped of turrets, suggest their use along the customs path. Tobruk's 360° firing made them hard to seize. Its entry has a concrete ledge with cut metal hoops, once anchoring camouflage netting over the trench to a larger bunker.

The MG Stand, buried in the path, linked by a trench (with two metal hooks for camouflage netting) to a bunker behind the villa, this improvised structure offered limited-angle protection.

The Ob Flak, now inexistent, eroded and demolished by Billiers's mairie, replaced a 1940s wooden trench.

Billiers's Light Defenses

On October 21, 1941, the occupiers barred civilians from the coast, except residents with an Ausweis. From 1942, the Atlantic Wall halted Morbihan beach tourism, confining it inland. Billiers was affected, unlike Muzillac's coastal zone.

To thwart landings or inland encirclement, the Germans deployed extensive obstacles.

Hindernisplattenpfahl—barbed-wire stakes—dot the cliff; rusted remnants persist in rock and mudflats, with galvanized stakes resisting salt up to Le Moustoir.

Six-element concrete tetrahedrons bore flat Tellermine anti-tank mines, triggered by 100 kilograms (220 lb), ripping landing barges. One, reused post-war by an oyster farmer, supports an abandoned park's walls, with fragments in villa gates.

Tellermines also formed two minefields on the peninsula.

With Damgan and Pénestin fortifications, this created a formidable material barrier, though manned by less capable troops—older soldiers, unfit for mobile combat, or foreign Wehrmacht recruits—spared from the Russian front.

Today, Atlantic Wall remnants fade, eroded or overtaken by tourism. At Pen Lan, some endure along the coastal path, less so at Domaine de Rochevilaine. In smugglers' tunnels, a casemate once held ten coast-watchers; now, it stores fine wines.

=== From Henri Dresch to Bertrand Jaquet, the Rochevilaine Estate ===
Post-World War II, Pen Lan Point fell into neglect, used as a dump. Yet, industrialist Henri Dresch, founder of Dresch Motors and a shipowner in Lancieux, Côtes-d'Armor, was smitten. Owning Dumet Island nearby, he bought Roche-Vilaine's rocks between 1950 and 1955, launching restoration with guesthouses and a seasonal eatery, Auberge de Pen Lan.

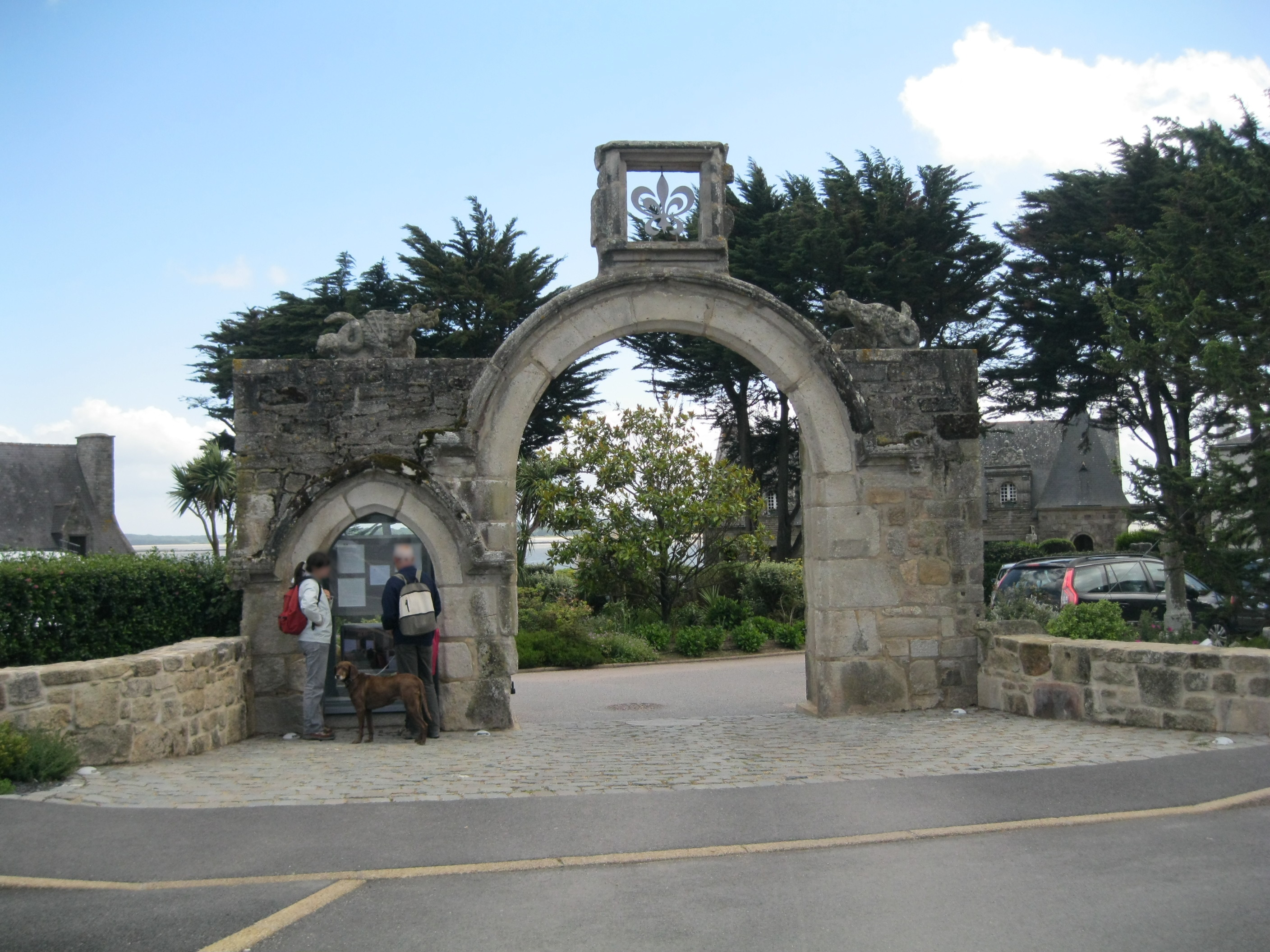
The Domaine de Rochevilaine gateway

During groundwork, Dresch unearthed a carved stone evoking a Carthaginian goddess, which he restored and placed on-site. This sparked a collection of antiquities—statues, carved stones, wells, baptismal fonts, fireplaces, doors, dormers, a fountain, calvary, ossuaries—forming an open-air lapidary museum. He even relocated entire manors: the Renaissance and Cardinals manors were rebuilt at Pen Lan. A grand "Truth Gateway" marks the expanded hotel complex, named Domaine de Rochevilaine.

Now under Bertrand Jaquet, it boasts 34 rooms, 4 suites, a restaurant led by chef Patrice Caillault, a water park, and a marine spa.

== Places and monuments ==
=== Megaliths ===
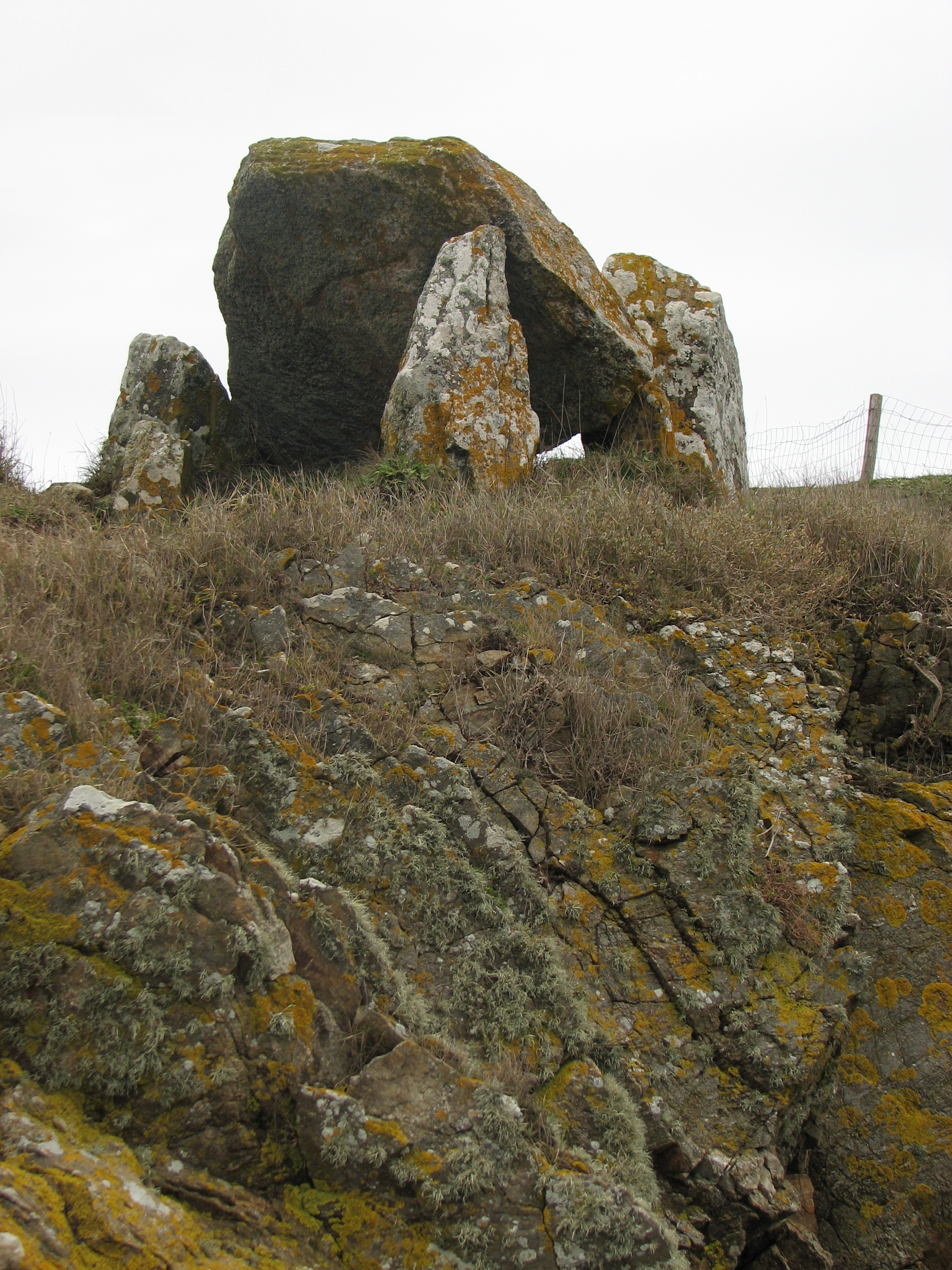
The Dolmen du Crapaud

The Dolmen des Granges, dubbed "le Crapaud" (the Toad) for its shape, has been a Historic Monument since 1978. Reduced to a large flat stone once atop vertical supports forming a quadrangular chamber, its access corridor vanished as the sea encroached. With the coast receding about ten meters since Neolithic times, this corridor could have been sizable (typically under two to over thirteen meters, as at Gavrinis).

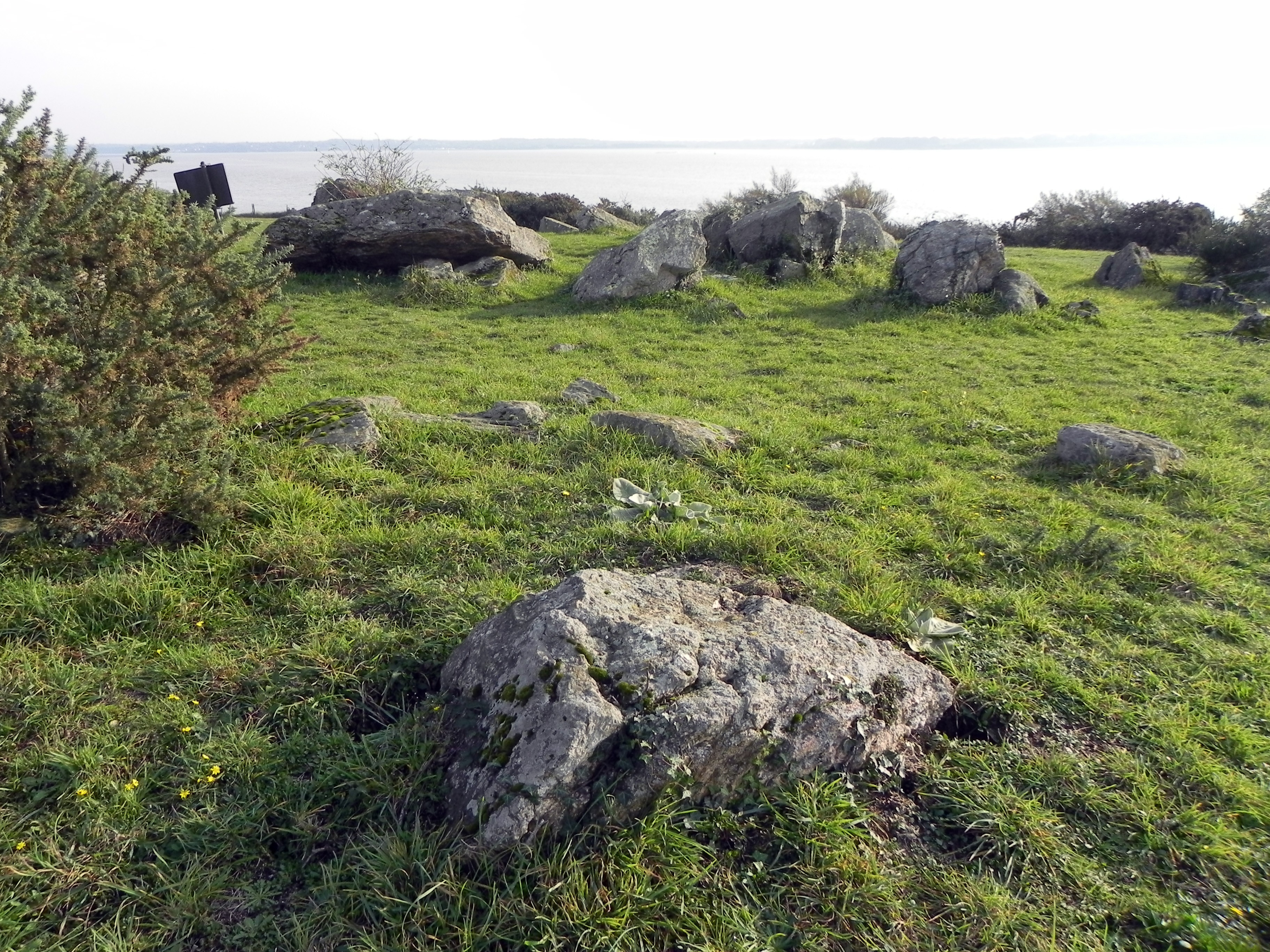
The Cairn des Grays

The Dolmen des Grays, better preserved, was listed on the Historic Monuments Inventory in 1934. Cleared of brambles by the municipality, it comprises three passage graves with compartmental traces (subdivided burial chambers) under a near-vanished stone mound or cairn. Part of the subdivided chambered tomb group from the late 5th millennium BCE, it aimed for multiple burials, with an estimated diameter of 20 to 30 meters (66 to 98 ft).

== Notable figures ==
=== Georges Cadoudal ===
During the Third Chouannerie, on the night of 28–29 November 1799, Georges Cadoudal orchestrated a landing of gold, arms, and munitions at Pen Lan Point.

=== Captain Bégo ===
In the 19th century, Alexis Bégo, "the Centenarian," was a local icon, featured on postcards. Starting as a Pen Lan fisherman, he sailed globally, retiring at 74 as chief coast signal keeper. Remarried after his wife's death, he reached 100, sharing with a visiting prefect his longevity secret: good food, sleep, and no smoking. Dying three years later, he facilitated the guardhouse’s sale, acting for Viscount de Saint-Belin, its first civilian owner in 1877.

=== Viscount Geoffroy de Saint-Belin ===
Viscount Geoffroy de Saint-Belin, Pen Lan's first civilian owner, pioneered coastal tourism there, building a vacation home near the abandoned guardhouse. In 1875, he sought to buy Rochevilaine, despite its poor state, but the war ministry delayed, deeming the guardhouse still militarily useful. Sold on 14 June 1877, after transfer to the Domains, it became a two-story square house with large windows and chimneys, capped at 7.60 meters (24.9 ft).
