= Piscine Tournesol =

Type of French public swimming pool

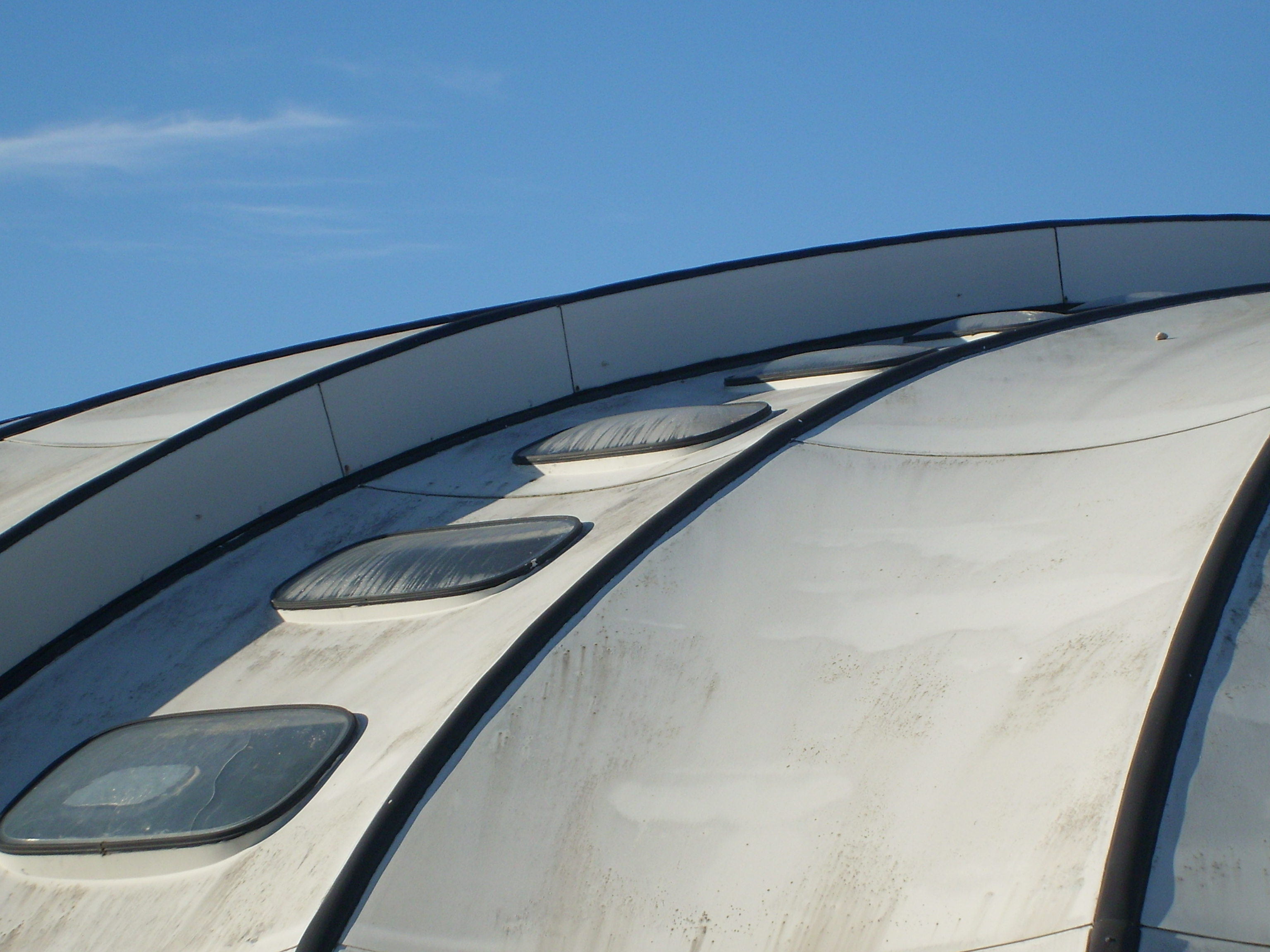
Close-up of an arch of a Sunflower Pool

A Piscine Tournesol or Sunflower Pool is a type of swimming pool built in France on an industrial scale in the late 1970s and early 1980s.

183 pools were built as a result of the French government's "Operation 1,000 pools" program.

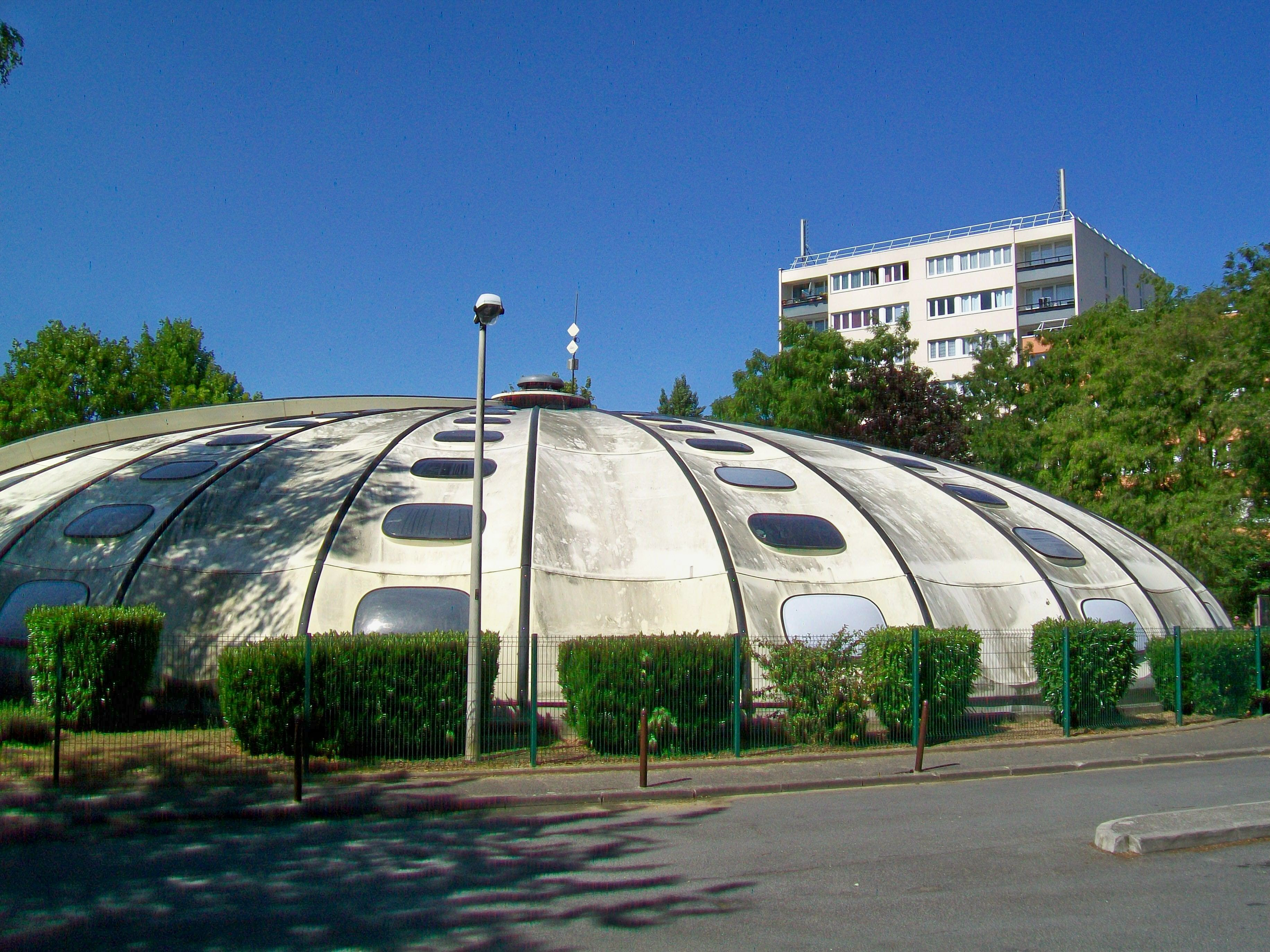
A Sunflower Pool in Fosses (Val-d'Oise).

== Background ==
"Operation 1,000 pools" was launched in 1969 and led by Joseph Comiti, the Secretary of State for Youth, Sports, and Leisure.

The purpose of the program was to promote swimming on a national level following disappointing results at the 1968 Summer Olympics and two accidents in 1969 that resulted in the deaths of 43 children.

Between 600 and 700 pools were built in five styles (Iris, Sky, Sun, Duck, and Sunflower). The Sunflower style edged out the others, winning two design competitions.

The Sunflower pool was the design of architect Bernard Schoeller, with Thémis Constantinidis as engineer, and the Matra company providing materials.

Out of the 250 Sunflower pools that were planned, 183 were built.

== Characteristics ==
There were two designs: one for 25 m pools and another for 50 m pools.

The roofs were 6 m tall and opened 120° hence the sunflower name, which, weather permitting, allowed the pools to function as semi-outdoor pools particularly in summer.

== Installations ==
A prototype was built in 1972 in the French commune of Nangis.

The national government dictated the design of the pools but local authorities ran and operated the pools.

Sunflower pools were some of the world's first large-scale prefabricated structures. Most Sunflower pools have since been renovated, adapted, or torn down.

Several Sunflower pools achieved heritage status in the twenty-first century including:

- the Bonneveine pool in Marseille (2000);
- the pool in Carros-le-Neuf (2005); and
- the pool in Biscarrosse in 2012.

== List of Sunflower pools ==
This is a list of 172 of the sunflower pools built, of which 100 remain.

In addition to the 183 pools in France, 3 were built in Luxembourg (of which one remains), 1 in Belgium and 1 in Saudi Arabia.

Department	Municipality	Name	Year of construction	Current status
Ain	Ambérieu-en-Bugey	Piscine Tournesol	1975	Demolished in 2005
Alpes-de-Haute-Provence	Manosque	Piscine Tournesol	1975	Rebuilt
Alpes-Maritimes	Roquebrune-Cap-Martin	Piscine Tournesol	1975	Closed in June 2015, destroyed by fire on 6 May 2017
Alpes-Maritimes	Mougins	Piscine Tournesol des Campelières	1975	Active, renovated in 2011
Alpes-Maritimes	Carros	Piscine Tournesol	1982	Active, renovated in 2005
Alpes-Maritimes	Saint-Laurent-du-Var	Piscine Tournesol	1975	Active
Alpes-Maritimes	Cagnes-sur-Mer	Piscine Tournesol	1975	Active
Ardèche	Privas	Piscine Tournesol	1976	Closed 18 July 2019
Ardèche	Beauchastel	Piscine Tournesol	1975	Active
Ardennes	Rethel	Piscine Tournesol	1975	Demolished 2014
Ardennes	Givet	Piscine Tournesol	1975	Closed in 2006, demolished in 2009
Ariège	Saverdun	Piscine du Girbet		Active as of January 2018
Aube	Bar-sur-Aube	Piscine Tournesol	1975	Demolished in January 2018
Aube	La Chapelle-Saint-Luc	Piscine Tournesol	1975	Destroyed by fire in 1979
Aveyron	Rodez	Piscine Tournesol	1975	Demolished in 2008
Bouches-du-Rhône	Marseille	Piscine Tournesol Charpentier	1975	Demolished in 2018
Bouches-du-Rhône	Marseille	Piscine Tournesol La Martine	1975	Active
Bouches-du-Rhône	Marseille	Piscine Tournesol Desautel	1975	Active, renovated in 2015
Bouches-du-Rhône	Marseille	Piscine Tournesol Frais-Vallon	1975	Active
Bouches-du-Rhône	Marseille	Piscine Tournesol de Bonneveine	1970	Active
Bouches-du-Rhône	Arles	Piscine Tournesol Philippe-Rouget	1975	Active
Bouches-du-Rhône	Aubagne	Piscine Tournesol Alain-Bernard Le Charrel	1975	Active
Bouches-du-Rhône	Lambesc	Piscine Tournesol	1975	Active
Bouches-du-Rhône	Vitrolles	Piscine Tournesol Liourat	1975	Active
Charente	Chasseneuil-sur-Bonnieure	Piscine Tournesol	1975	Active
Dordogne	Saint-Astier	Piscine Tournesol	1975	Active
Drôme	Valence	Piscine Tournesol des Fontbarlettes	1975	Active
Eure	Pacy-sur-Eure	Piscine Tournesol Robert-Taron	1975	Active
Eure	Étrépagny	Piscine Tournesol	1975	Active
Eure	Saint-Marcel	Piscine Tournesol	1975	Demolished in 2007
Finistère	Quimperlé	Piscine Tournesol de Kerjouanneau	1976	Demolished in 2009
Finistère	Landivisiau	Piscine Tournesol	1973	Closed in 2007, demolished in 2011
Haute-Garonne	Toulouse	Piscine Tournesol Toulouse-Lautrec	1980	Active
Haute-Garonne	Toulouse	Piscine Tournesol Papus	1975	Active
Haute-Garonne	Muret	Piscine Tournesol		Demolished
Haute-Garonne	Saint-Gaudens	Piscine Tournesol	1975	Active
Haute-Garonne	Saint-Orens-de-Gameville	Piscine intercommunale du Sicoval		Active
Gironde	Saint-Médard-en-Jalles	Piscine Tournesol	1981	Demolished in 2007
Gironde	Lesparre-Médoc	Piscine Tournesol	1975	Demolished in 2016
Gironde	Cestas	Piscine Tournesol	1975	Active
Gironde	Braud-et-Saint-Louis	Piscine Tournesol	1975	Active
Hérault	Montpellier	Piscine municipale Suzanne-Berlioux – La Rauze	1975	Active
Hérault	Montpellier	Piscine Tournesol Jean Vivès	1975	Active
Hérault	Montpellier	Piscine Jean Taris – Pompignane	1975	Active
Hérault	Frontignan	Piscine Tournesol Joseph-Di-Stephano	1975	Active
Hérault	Mauguio	Espace Aquad'Or	1978	Active, renovated in 2020
Hérault	Agde	Piscine Tournesol René Carayon	1975	Transformed in 2011 into a space for Circus Arts
Ille-et-Vilaine	Rennes	Piscine Tournesol des Gayeulles	1975	Demolished in 2008
Ille-et-Vilaine	Cesson-Sévigné	Piscine Tournesol	1975	Demolished in 1992
Indre	Chabris	Piscine Tournesol	1975	Active
Indre-et-Loire	Tours	Piscine Tournesol	1977	Demolished in 2008
Isère	Roussillon	Piscine Tournesol Charly-Kirakossian	1975	Active
Isère	Charvieu-Chavagneux	Piscine Tournesol	1973	Active
Isère	Bourgoin-Jallieu	Piscine Tournesol	1975	Closed in June 2022
Isère	Moirans	Piscine Tournesol	1975	Active
Isère	Les Abrets	Piscine Tournesol	1975	Active
Isère	Le Pont-de-Claix	Piscine Tournesol	1975	Demolished in 2000
Isère	Saint-Martin-le-Vinoux	Piscine Tournesol	1975	Expected to close January 2021
Jura	Morbier	Piscine Tournesol	1975	Reconstructed in the 2000s
Landes	Dax	Piscine Tournesol André-Darrigade	1980	Closed October 2020
Landes	Biscarrosse	Piscine Tournesol	1975	Active
Landes	Saint-Paul-lès-Dax	Piscine Tournesol	1975	Active
Loir-et-Cher	Blois	Piscine Tournesol	1975	Destroyed by fire in 1999, rebuilt in 2004. Active.
Loire	Sorbiers	Piscine Tournesol de Sorbiers	1977	Active
Loire-Atlantique	Bouguenais	Piscine Tournesol	1975	Active, major re-design in 1995.
Haute-Loire	Langeac	Piscine Tournesol	1975	Undergoing renovation. Expected to re-open in 2023.
Maine-et-Loire	Angers	Piscine André-Bertin	1975	Demolished in 2015
Maine-et-Loire	Cholet	Piscine Tournesol	1976	Demolished in 2008
Maine-et-Loire	Trélazé	Piscine Tournesol	1975	Active
Manche	Cherbourg-en-Cotentin	Piscine de la Butte	1975	Active
Manche	Granville	Piscine Tournesol	1975	Closed in 2018
Marne	Vertus	Salle Tournesol	1975	Transformed into a sports centre
Marne	Fère-Champenoise	Piscine Tournesol	1975	Active
Marne	Cormontreuil	Piscine Louvois	1975	Active
Marne	Fagnières	Piscine Tournesol	1975	Demolished
Meurthe-et-Moselle	Briey	Piscine Tournesol	1975	Demolished
Meurthe-et-Moselle	Saint-Nicolas-de-Port	Piscine Tournesol	1975	Demolished in 2004
Meurthe-et-Moselle	Longuyon	Piscine Tournesol	1975	Active
Morbihan	Lorient	Piscine Tournesol du Bois du Château	1977	Restricted access
Morbihan	Nivillac	Piscine des Métairies	1974	Active
Morbihan	Baud	Piscine Tournesol	1975	Demolished in 2018
Morbihan	Locminé	Piscine Tournesol	1975	Closed in 2012, demolished November 2015.
Moselle	Moyeuvre-Grande	Piscine Tournesol	1975	Demolished in 2012
Moselle	Bouzonville	Piscine Tournesol		Closed in July 2016; demolished in August 2016
Nord	Lille	Piscine Tournesol d'Hellemmes	1975	Active
Nord	Lille	Piscine Tournesol du Sud	1975	Demolished
Nord	Loos	Ancienne Piscine Tournesol	1975	Converted into a dojo in 1995–1996
Nord	Escaudain	Piscine Tournesol Maurice Thorez	1975	Closed in 2009, reconstructed without dome
Nord	Lambersart	Piscine Tournesol	1975	Active
Nord	Saint-Amand-les-Eaux	Piscine Tournesol Thérèse-Clemmersseune	1975	Demolished in 2016
Nord	Mons-en-Barœul	Piscine Tournesol	1975	Demolished
Nord	Sin-le-Noble	Piscine Tournesol	1975	Active
Nord	Douai	Piscine Tournesol Beausoleil	1975	Active
Nord	Marquette-lez-Lille	Piscine Tournesol	1975	Demolished in 2012
Nord	Caudry	Piscine Tournesol	1975	Demolished in March 2016
Nord	Cambrai	Piscine Les Ondines	1975	Active
Nord	Aniche	Piscine Tournesol	1975	Closed in 2017, expected to be demolished
Nord	Raismes	Piscine Tournesol Louis Poncet	1975	Active
Nord	Maubeuge	Piscine Tournesol Épinette	1975	Active
Nord	Louvroil	Piscine Tournesol Léon-Blum	1975	Demolished
Nord	Saint-Saulve	Piscine Tournesol	1975	Reconstructed in 2002, without dome
Nord	Auby	Piscine Tournesol	1975	Reconstructed in 2015, without dome
Nord	Tourcoing	Piscine Tournesol de la Bourgogne	1978	Demolished
Oise	Beauvais	Piscine Tournesol Aldebert-Bellier	1975	Active
Oise	Formerie	Piscine Tournesol		Replaced in September 2003.
Orne	Flers	Piscine Tournesol	1975	Destroyed by fire
Orne	Mortagne-au-Perche	Piscine Tournesol	1974	Demolished in 2010
Pas-de-Calais	Achicourt	Piscine Tournesol		Active
Pas-de-Calais	Calais	Piscine Tournesol	1975	Demolished
Pas-de-Calais	Douvrin	Piscine Tournesol	1975	Demolished in 2020
Pas-de-Calais	Carvin	Piscine Tournesol	1975	Destroyed by fire in 2006
Pas-de-Calais	Courrières	Piscine Tournesol	1975	Demolished
Pas-de-Calais	Divion	Piscine Tournesol	1975	Active
Pas-de-Calais	Beuvry	Piscine Tournesol	1975	Closed in 2011; demolished 2012
Pas-de-Calais	Mazingarbe	Piscine Tournesol	1975	Demolished
Puy-de-Dôme	Clermont-Ferrand	Piscine Jacques-Magnier	1975	Active
Puy-de-Dôme	Cournon-d'Auvergne	Piscine Tournesol	1975	Demolished in 2013
Pyrénées-Atlantiques	Hendaye	Piscine Tournesol d'Irandatz	1975	Active
Hautes-Pyrénées	Tarbes	Piscine Tournesol	1975	Active
Hautes-Pyrénées	Lannemezan	Piscine Tournesol	1975	Active
Pyrénées-Atlantiques	Oloron-Sainte-Marie	Piscine Tournesol	1977	Entirely reconstructed in 1997
Pyrénées-Orientales	Saint-Estève	Piscine Tournesol	1975	Active
Bas-Rhin	Obernai	Piscine Tournesol	1975	Demolished in 2013
Bas-Rhin	Lingolsheim	Piscine Tournesol	1975	Active, renovated in 2015
Bas-Rhin	Saverne	Piscine Tournesol	1979	Demolished in 2012
Haut-Rhin	Ferrette	Piscine Tournesol	1978	Closed since 2016 for structural improvements
Haut-Rhin	Ottmarsheim	Piscine Tournesol	1975	Closed in 2014, demolished 2016
Haut-Rhin	Tagolsheim	Piscine Tournesol	1975	Demolished in 2017
Haut-Rhin	Fessenheim	Piscine Tournesol	1975	Demolished in 2014
Rhône	Villefranche-sur-Saône	Piscine Tournesol	1975	Demolished
Rhône	Cours	Piscine Tournesol	1975	Closed in March 2019 for renovations
Rhône	La Mulatière	Piscine Tournesol	1975	Active
Métropole de Lyon	Décines-Charpieu	Piscine Tournesol	1975	Demolished in 2007
Métropole de Lyon	Chassieu	Piscine Tournesol	1975	Demolished in 2002
Métropole de Lyon	La Mulatière	Piscine municipale du Roule	1975	Active, to be renovated
Sarthe	Le Mans	Piscine Tournesol des Ardriers	1981	Active
Sarthe	Écommoy	Piscine Tournesol	1975	Demolished
Haute-Savoie	Passy	Piscine Tournesol de Marlioz	1975	Active, renovated in 2014
Seine-Maritime	Le Petit-Quevilly	Piscine Tournesol	1975	Active
Seine-Maritime	Bonsecours	Piscine Tournesol	1975	Demolished in 2012
Seine-Maritime	Montivilliers	Piscine Tournesol	1976	Demolished in 2008
Seine-Maritime	Arques-la-Bataille	Piscine Tournesol		Closed in September 2014, awaiting renovation
Seine-Maritime	Malaunay	Piscine municipale	1976	Active
Seine-et-Marne	Montereau-Fault-Yonne	Piscine Tournesol	1975	Destroyed by fire in 2007
Seine-et-Marne	Nemours	Piscine Tournesol	1975	Active
Seine-et-Marne	Villeparisis	Piscine Tournesol Jean-Taris	1975	Active
Seine-et-Marne	Nangis	Piscine Tournesol	1972	(Original Prototype) Closed in 2009, demolished.
Seine-et-Marne	Combs-la-Ville	Piscine Tournesol	1973	Being renovated
Seine-et-Marne	Roissy-en-Brie	Piscine Tournesol	1972	Demolished
Yvelines	Versailles	Piscine Tournesol de Porchefontaine	1975	Demolished in 2002
Yvelines	Les Mureaux	Piscine Tournesol	1975	Active
Yvelines	Montigny-le-Bretonneux	Piscine Tournesol Louison-Bobet	1981	Demolished in 2000
Yvelines	Porcheville	Piscine Tournesol	1975	Active
Deux-Sèvres	Parthenay	Piscine Tournesol	1975	Demolished
Somme	Friville-Escarbotin	Piscine Tournesol	1973	Demolished in January 2014
Somme	Ham	Piscine Tournesol		Demolished
Somme	Poix-de-Picardie	Piscine Tournesol	1975	Closed in April 2016
Somme	Péronne	Piscine Tournesol	1975	Demolished in January 2018
Var	Six-Fours-les-Plages	Piscine Tournesol	1975	Active
Var	Saint-Raphaël	Piscine Tournesol	1975	Demolished
Vienne	Poitiers	Piscine Tournesol La Blaiserie	1975	Active
Vienne	Loudun	Piscine Tournesol	1980	Demolished
Vienne	Chauvigny	Piscine Tournesol	1975	Active, renovated in 2004
Haute-Vienne	Limoges	Piscine Tournesol de Beaubreuil	1975	Demolished in 2017
Haute-Vienne	Saint-Léonard-de-Noblat	Piscine Tournesol	1973	Demolished about 2006
Vosges	Bruyères	Piscine Tournesol	1975	Active, renovated in 2019
Yonne	Sens	Piscine Tournesol	1975	Active, renovated in 2015
Yonne	Saint-Florentin	Piscine Tournesol	1975, opened 1976	Active in 2019
Essonne	Lisses	Piscine Tournesol	1975	Active
Essonne	Grigny	Piscine Tournesol	1975	Active
Essonne	Épinay-sous-Sénart	Piscine Tournesol	1975	Active, renovated in 2012
Essonne	Montlhéry	Piscine Tournesol	1975	Demolished
Seine-Saint-Denis	Bondy	Piscine Tournesol	1975	Active
Seine-Saint-Denis	Les Lilas	Piscine Tournesol R. Mulinghausen	1975	Active
Val-d'Oise	Sannois	Piscine Tournesol Pierre-Williot	1975	Active
Val-d'Oise	Ermont	Piscine Tournesol Marcellin-Berthelot	1975	Active
Val-d'Oise	Saint-Ouen-l'Aumône	Piscine Tournesol des Béthunes	1975	Active, renovated between 2017 and 2019
Val-d'Oise	Villiers-le-Bel	Piscine Tournesol	1975	Demolished
Val-d'Oise	Fosses	Piscine Tournesol	1975	Active
Val-d'Oise	Éragny	Piscine Tournesol	1975	Active
Val-d'Oise	Herblay-sur-Seine	Piscine Tournesol		Closed in 2014, transformed into a pétanque court
Luxembourg, Echternach canton	Berdorf	Piscine Tournesol		Demolished
Luxembourg, Mersch canton	Mersch	Piscine Tournesol	1980	Closed in June 2003, demolished thereafter
Luxembourg, Mersch canton	Larochette	Piscine Tournesol	1975	Active, renovated in 2024

== Legacy ==
A model Sunflower pool is featured at the Architecture and Heritage City Museum in Paris.

A photo by Aurore Valade of the Sunflower Pool in Beauvais was published in 2008 in the photo book Plein air.

== Additional reading ==
- Schoeller, Bernard; Secrétariat d'État à la Jeunesse et aux Sports (1972). Projet Tournesol. Paris: R. Lacer. p. 31. LCCN 75503940. OCLC 1505704.
- Monnier, Gérard (2000). "Les piscines Tournesol". L'architecture moderne en France. Librairie de l'architecture et de la ville (in French). Vol. 3. Paris: Éditions Picard. pp. 16–18, 311. ISBN 2-7084-0571-3.
- Patrick Facon, « Les piscines Tournesol », dans Monnier, Gérard; Klein, Richard (2002). Les années ZUP (in French). Paris: Picard. pp. 91–110, 301. ISBN 2-7084-0629-9.
- "Remise à neuf de la coupole d'une piscine 'Tournesol'". Les Cahiers techniques du bâtiment (279): 32–34. 2008. ISSN 0241-6794.
- Fillion, Odile (2000). "Volumes d'eau". D'A. d'Architectures (104): 36–51.
