= Joseph Comiti =

Joseph Comiti (4 June 1920, Sotta – 10 November 2000, Bastia) was a French physician, surgeon and politician.

A member of parliament for the Bouches-du-Rhône department (province) of France, Comiti served as Secretary of State for Youth, Sports, and Leisure, and as Minister for Parliamentary Relations in the late 1960s to the early 1970s.

== Career ==
Comiti was a gastroenterologist surgeon and an associate professor at the faculty of medicine and practices at the Timone hospital in Marseilles.

He was a deputy for Bouches-du-Rhône from 1968 to 1981.

Comiti served as Secretary of State for Youth, Sports, and Leisure from July 1968 to April 1973 and again during 1974 under the presidencies of Charles de Gaulle and Georges Pompidou, and as Minister for Parliamentary Relations between April 1973 and February 1974.

As Secretary of State for Youth, Sports, and Leisure, he spearheaded 'Operation 1,000 pools', which resulted in the construction of 600-700 new pools, including 183 sunflower pools, across the country.

Until 1998, he chaired the finance committee of the Regional Council of Provence-Alpes-Côte-d'Azur.
