= Canton of Muzillac =

Coordinates: 47.56°N 2.48°W

The canton of Muzillac is an administrative division of the Morbihan department, northwestern France. Its borders were modified at the French canton reorganisation which came into effect in March 2015. Its seat is in Muzillac.

It consists of the following communes:

1. Ambon
2. Arzal
3. Billiers
4. Camoël
5. Damgan
6. Férel
7. Le Guerno
8. Marzan
9. Muzillac
10. Nivillac
11. Noyal-Muzillac
12. Péaule
13. Pénestin
14. La Roche-Bernard
15. Saint-Dolay
