= Saint-Dolay =

Saint-Dolay Sant-Aelwez
- Commune
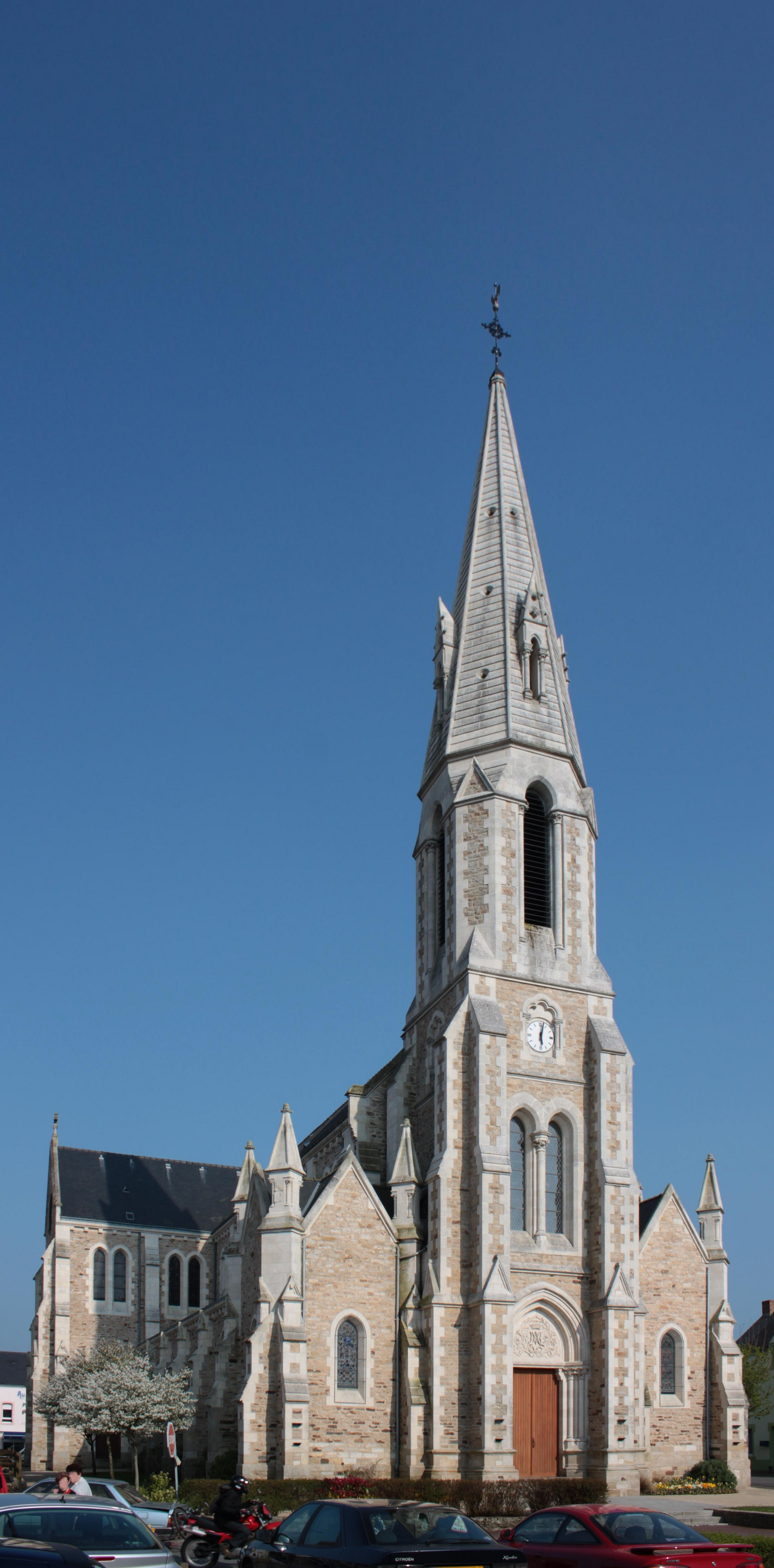
- The church of the Immaculate Conception, in Saint-Dolay
- Location of Saint-Dolay
- Location within France Location within Brittany
- Coordinates: 47°32′44″N 2°09′12″W
- Country: France
- Region: Brittany
- Department: Morbihan
- Arrondissement: Vannes
- Canton: Muzillac
- Intercommunality: Arc Sud Bretagne

Government
  - Mayor (2026–32): Patrick Géraud
- Area^{1}: 48.26 km^{2} (18.63 sq mi)
- Highest elevation: 69 m (226 ft)
- Lowest elevation: 1 m (3.3 ft)
- Population (2023): 2,645
  - Density: 54.81/km^{2} (142.0/sq mi)
- Time zone: UTC+01:00 (CET)
  - Summer (DST): UTC+02:00 (CEST)
- INSEE/Postal code: 56212 /56130
- ^{1} French Land Register data, which excludes lakes, ponds, glaciers > 1 km^{2} (0.386 sq mi or 247 acres) and river estuaries.

Saint-Dolay (French pronunciation: [sɛ̃ dɔlɛ]; Breton: Sant-Aelwez) is a commune in the Morbihan department of Brittany in north-western France.

== Population ==
Historical population
Year	Pop.	±% p.a.
1968	2,085	—
1975	2,057	−0.19%
1982	2,147	+0.61%
1990	2,113	−0.20%
1999	1,977	−0.74%
2007	2,136	+0.97%
2012	2,387	+2.25%
2017	2,487	+0.82%
2023	2,645	+1.03%
Source: INSEE

Inhabitants of Saint-Dolay are called in French Dolaysiens.

== See also ==
- Communes of the Morbihan department
