= Péaule =

Péaule Pleaol
- Commune
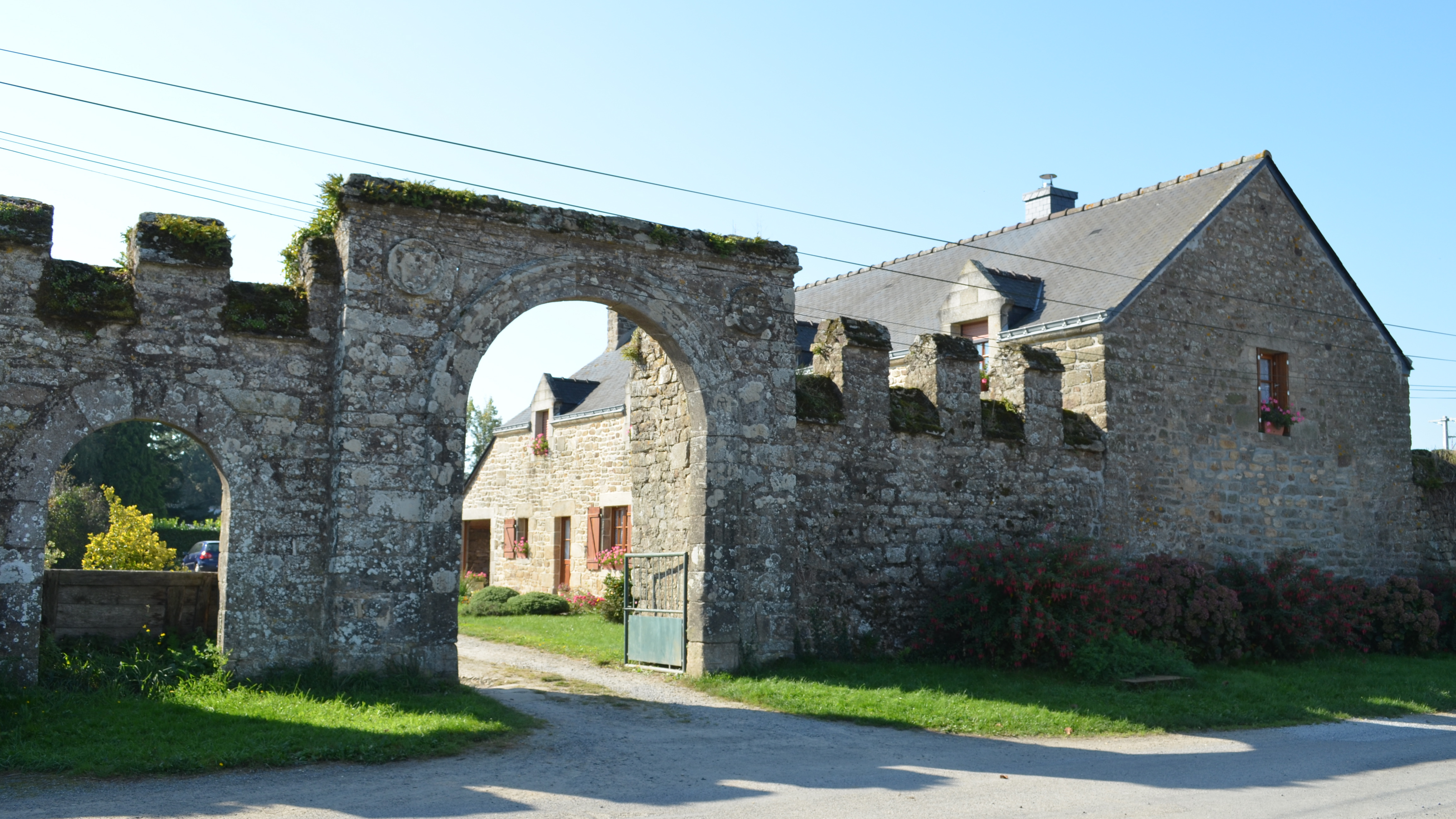
- The entrance to the deanery

- Coat of arms
- Location of Péaule
- Location within France Location within Brittany
- Coordinates: 47°34′57″N 2°21′18″W
- Country: France
- Region: Brittany
- Department: Morbihan
- Arrondissement: Vannes
- Canton: Muzillac
- Intercommunality: Arc Sud Bretagne

Government
  - Mayor (2026–32): Jean-François Breger
- Area^{1}: 39.25 km^{2} (15.15 sq mi)
- Highest elevation: 92 m (302 ft)
- Lowest elevation: 0 m (0 ft)
- Population (2023): 2,929
  - Density: 74.62/km^{2} (193.3/sq mi)
- Time zone: UTC+01:00 (CET)
  - Summer (DST): UTC+02:00 (CEST)
- INSEE/Postal code: 56153 /56130
- ^{1} French Land Register data, which excludes lakes, ponds, glaciers > 1 km^{2} (0.386 sq mi or 247 acres) and river estuaries.

Péaule (French pronunciation: [peol]; Breton: Pleaol) is a commune in the Morbihan department of Brittany in north-western France.

== Population ==
Historical population
Year	Pop.	±% p.a.
1968	1,943	—
1975	1,917	−0.19%
1982	2,138	+1.57%
1990	2,188	+0.29%
1999	2,206	+0.09%
2007	2,458	+1.36%
2012	2,503	+0.36%
2017	2,682	+1.39%
2023	2,929	+1.48%
Source: INSEE

Inhabitants of Péaule are called in French Paulais.

== See also ==
- Communes of the Morbihan department
