= Calvary at Guéhenno =

Coordinates: 47.8917°N 2.6389°W

The Calvary of Guéhenno, dating from 1550, is located in the village of Guéhenno in the Pontivy arrondissement of Brittany. The calvary is classified as one of the seven great calvaries of Brittany and is the furthest to the east, being located in the ancient diocese of Vannes. It is made entirely from granite save for some bas-reliefs carved using "pierre bleutée" (a bluish stone). The granite used is fine grained which lends itself to being carved. Extracted from the Guéhenno region, it was also used for the north porch at Ploërmel and the façade of the château at Josselin.

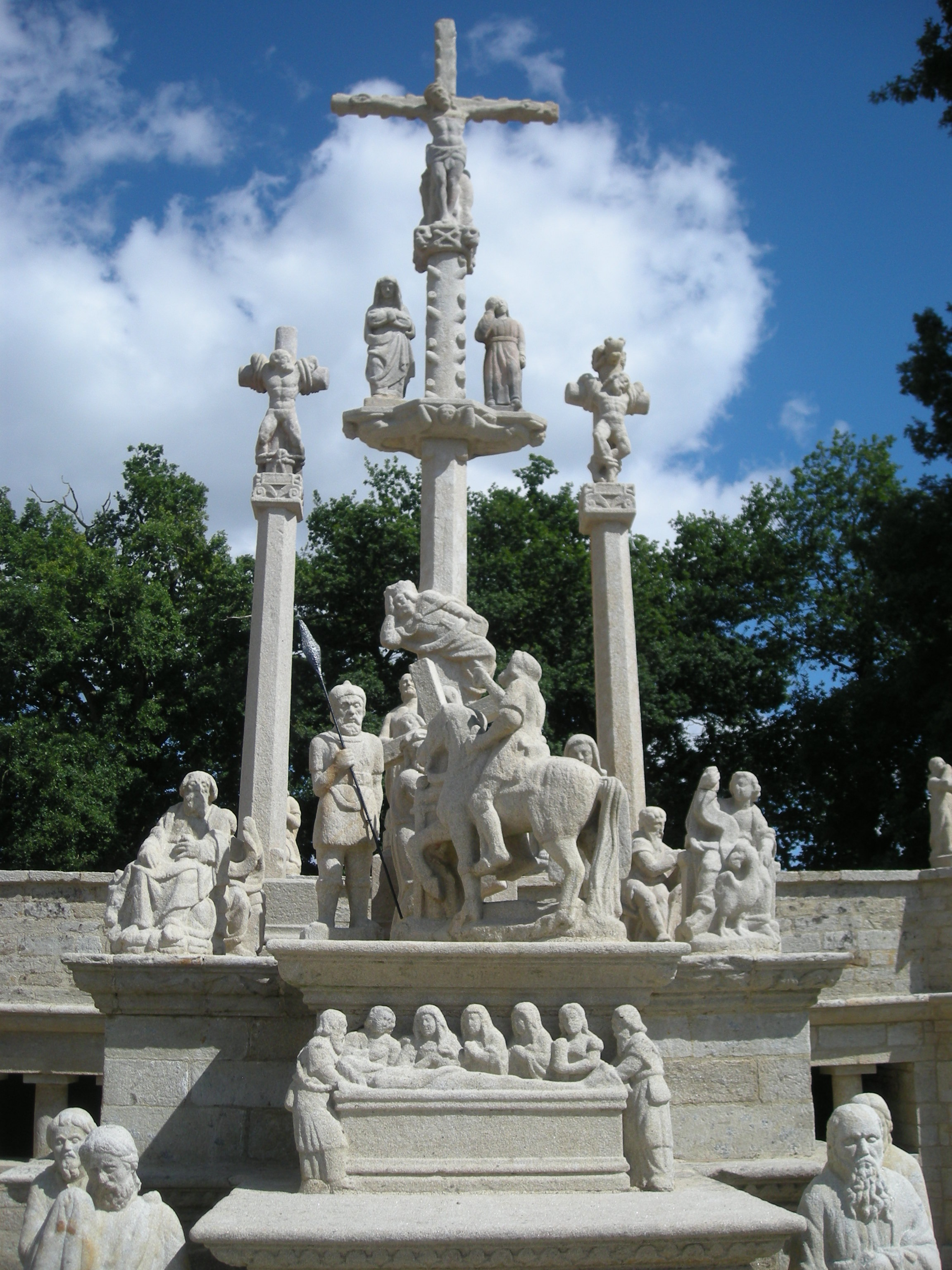
The calvary of Guéhenno. Note the four prophets placed around the altar table on top of which there is a "Mise au tombeau" (Christ being prepared for burial). The prophets are the work of Jacquot and the "Mise au tombeau" is by Guillonic

== Introduction ==
Guéhenno originally had the archetypal "enclos paroissial" with the parish church, an ossuary, calvary and cemetery. In 1794 however, troops of the Republican Army, pausing on their journey to Josselin, pillaged the village, burnt down the 16th-Century church and severely damaged the calvary which dated back to 1550 and was attributed to the sculptor F. Guillouic. In 1853 the new rector, Abbé Jacquot, set about rebuilding the calvary assisted by his rector Laumaillė and two masons; fortunately the villagers had managed to hide away the fragments left after the soldiers' attack, secreting them in the ossuary, granary and other places and having mastered the rudiments of sculpture, Jacquot even added some extra pieces. Two inscriptions tell the story. "J.GUILLOUIC A FACIT CESTE CROUA DE P[AR] LES P[A]RROISSIE[N]S 1550" and "REFAIT EN 1853 JACQUOT R[ECTEUR] DREAN M[AIRE]. LAUMAILLÉ VICAIRE." Jacquot also added several sculptures to a new ossuary built in 1863. The church was also rebuilt. The calvary has three crosses emerging from a large granite pedestal, the central cross being occupied by Jesus Christ whilst the two robbers executed alongside Jesus hang from the two smaller crosses. At the front of this pedestal, a smaller granite slab forms an altar table and facing the calvary Jacquot placed a column on which the instruments of the passion were carved, a rooster sitting at the top of the column representing Saint Peter's denial of Christ. Jacquot also added to the sides of the altar table the images of the Prophets Isaiah, Jeremiah, Daniel and Ezekiel. Jacquot died in 1866, aged 66 years. The calvary was designated a "monument historique" in 1927. Apart from the rooster topped column and the four prophets which are attributable to Jacquot alone, Jacquot also made some other alterations to pieces originally sculpted by Guillouic. As a result, the attributions are not always crystal clear.

== The crosses ==
The image of the crucified Jesus Christ hangs from the central cross ("Le Christ à l'agonie") which is 10 metres high. On the crosspiece are statues depicting the Virgin Mary and John the Apostle. Two cherubs are on the arms of the cross. Two smaller crosses stand at each side of the central cross and from these hang the bodies of the two robbers executed alongside Jesus. At the base of the central cross is a pietà ("Vierge de pitié"). The sculpture of the bad robber with attendant demon are by Jacquot whilst the good robber was carved by Guillouic.

== Bas-reliefs around the pedestal ==
On each face of the pedestal is a bas-relief depicting a scene from the passion. The first on the pedestal's south side shows Jesus praying in the Garden of Olives/Gethsemane as three of his apostles sleep ("Agonie du Christ"). The bas-relief at the rear of the calvary, the eastern side, shows the flagellation. Jesus is surrounded by two soldiers holding whips. The third relief on the west side depicts Christ's resurrection and in the final relief on the north side Jesus sits between two Roman soldiers who are kneeling and mocking him, one handing him a reed and joking that he should hold it as his sceptre; the "Christ aux outrages" or "Dėrision du Christ". It is not thought that the bas-reliefs are by either Guillouic or Jacquot but that they are the work of two different 16th Century sculptors.

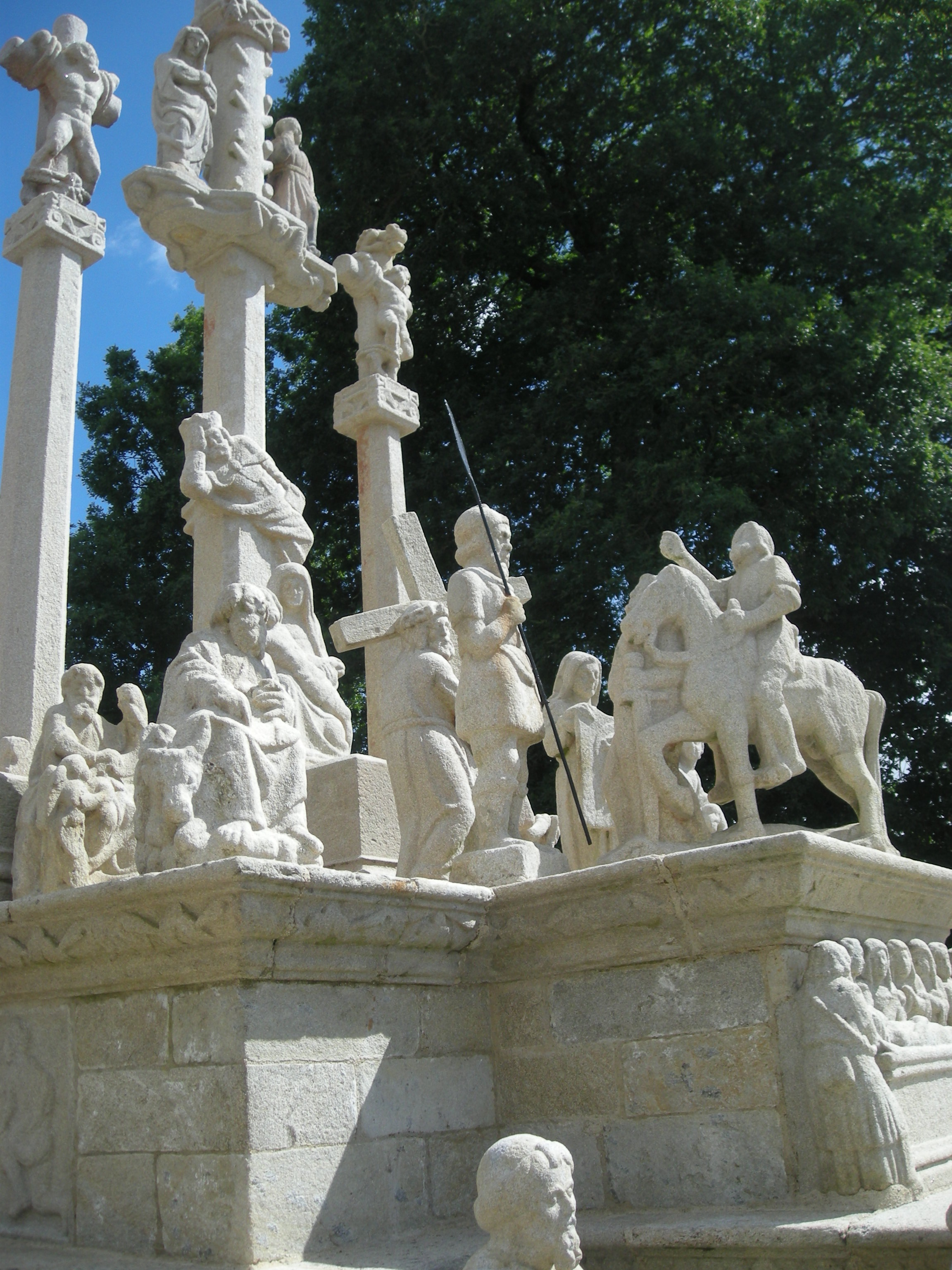
Front left on the corner of the pedestal we see St Mark sitting on a bull and behind him, St Matthew. At the front we see the Roman soldier on horseback and the second centurian standing with a lance. We can see the pietà, Jesus carrying the cross and St Veronica holding her veil. Above the pietà on the central cross' shaft we see the sleeping Jesse. Note the small demon appearing above the "bad robber" to the right of the central cross

== The ossuary ==
There are several statues outside the ossuary. Statues depicting two young women face away from the calvary and look towards the ossuary entrance which is guarded by two Roman soldiers. There is also a monster representing Satan. Inside the ossuary there is a gisant representing Christ in his tomb, this sculpted in 1863. Christ is accompanied by three sleeping cherubs. On the side of the ossuary facing the church there is a beautiful altar-piece from the 15th Century which shows, from left to right, Jesus at prayer, the Stations of the Cross, the crucifixion, the descent from the cross and the entombment.

== The pedestal ==
The three crosses are placed on and emerge from a large stone pedestal on which there are various sculptures. In the centre of the pedestal there is a scene depicting the Stations of the Cross with a centurion, on horseback, whilst a second centurian holds the lance which had pierced Jesus' side. At each corner of the pedestal are statues of the evangelists, Matthew the Apostle with his attribute the child, Luke the Evangelist who sits on a bull, Mark the Evangelist with a lion and John the Evangelist with an eagle. There is also a sculpture depicting Christ carry the cross and Saint Veronica holding up the veil on which Jesus' image has appeared and finally a pietà, the Virgin Mary holding the body of Christ which has just been brought down from the cross. The pietà is by Guillouic. There is also a figure on the shaft of the central cross. He seems to be sleeping and is a depiction of Jesse the father of David and thus an ancestor of Jesus. At the feet of the crucified Jesus are two skulls and two crossed bones symbolizing that Jesus' death has washed away the sins of mankind.

== The altar table ==
The altar table comprises a smaller pedestal at the front of the larger pedestal and on this is a bas-relief which depicts Jesus' apparition before the empty tomb. Beneath this is an inscription added by Abbé Jacquot stating that any visitor saying prayers at the calvary will be given 40 days of grace after saying "5 Paters and 3 Ave Marias." On the altar table's surface is a depiction of the entombment ("Mise au tombeau") attended by Saint Nicodemus and Joseph of Arimathea, John the Evangelist and three female saints. This is attributed to Guillouic. To the side of the altar there are statues of the Prophets Isaiah, Jeremiah, Ezechiel and Daniel. Each carries a banner. Isaiah's banner reads "Salvabos gregem meum", Jeremiah's reads "Saturabitur opprobriis", Ezechiel's reads "Et cum sceleratis reputatus est" and Daniel's "Christus occidetur". The four sculptures are attributed to Jacquot. .

== The column in front of the calvary ==
On this column, the work of Abbé Jacquot, are carvings depicting the instruments of the passion: two Holy Lances, one of which had held the Holy Sponge drenched in vinegar which had been offered to Jesus and the second the lance which had pierced Jesus' side, the whip, the rope with which Jesus was tied to the cross, the crown of thorns, a pair of pincers and three nails as well as the reed which had been placed mockingly in Jesus' hand as though it was his sceptre. At the very top is a rooster as a reminder of Saint Peter's denial of Jesus.

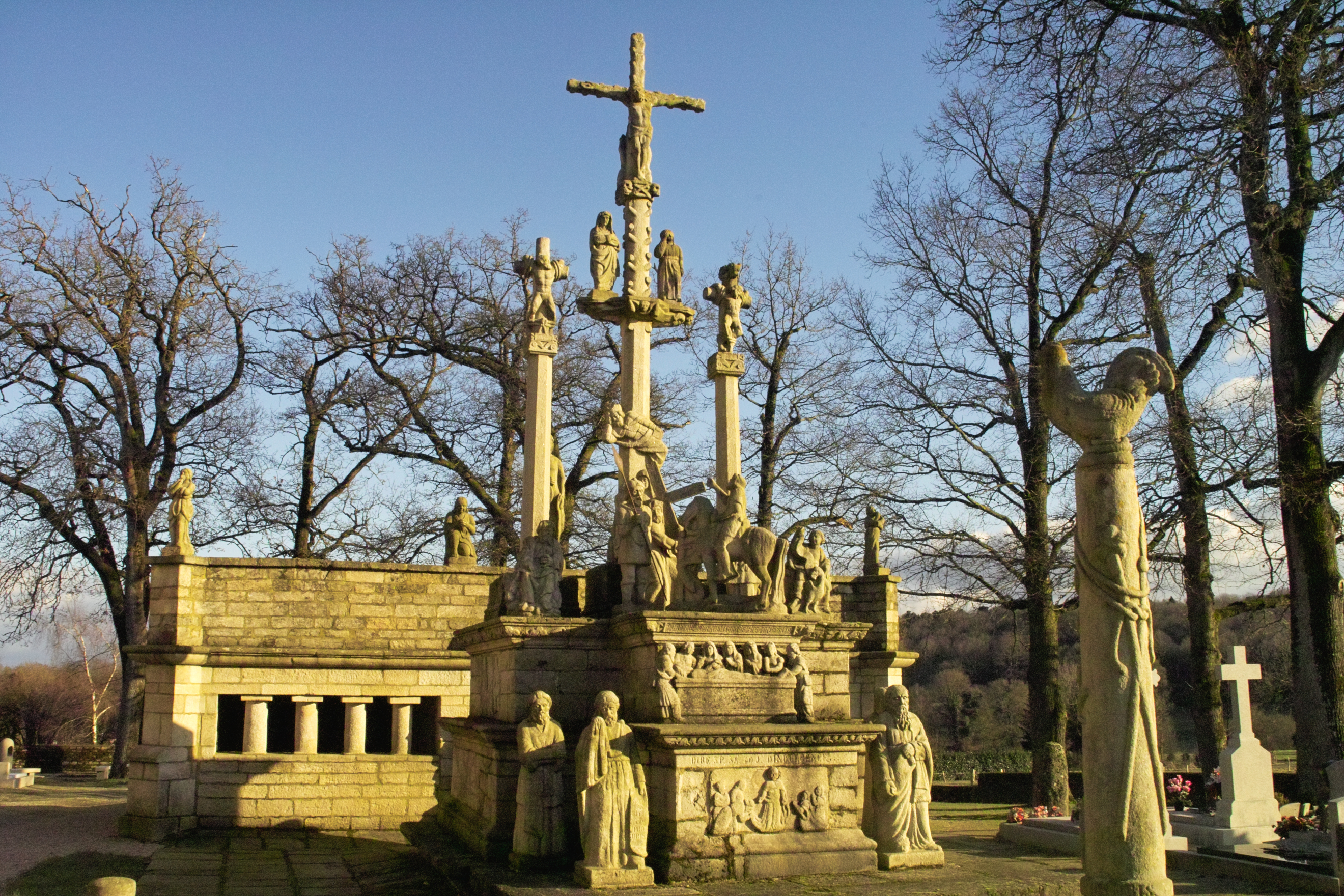
Another view of the Guéhenno calvary with the ossuary behind it

== Recommended reading ==
"Sculpteurs sur pierre en Basse-Bretagne. Les Ateliers du XVe au XVIIe Siècle" by Emmanuelle LeSeac'h. Published by Presses Universitaires de Rennes. ISBN 978-2-7535-3309-7. Victor-Henri Debidour. "Grands Calvaires de Bretagne". Éditions d'Art Jos Le Doaré. 1998. ISBN 2-855-43-191-3
