= Billiers =

Commune in Brittany, France

Billiers Beler
- Commune
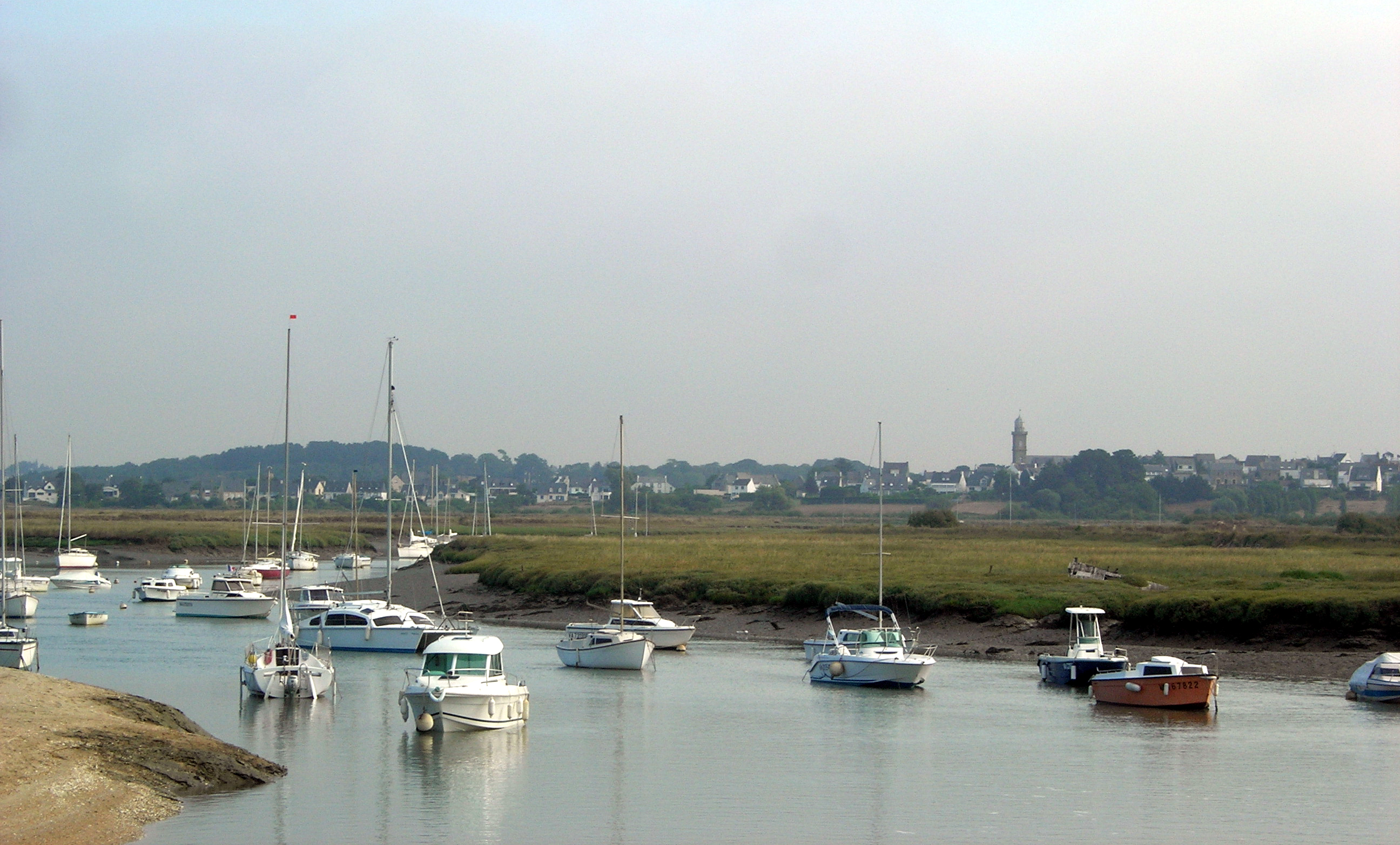
- Penn Lann harbour

- Coat of arms
- Location of Billiers
- Location within France Location within Brittany
- Coordinates: 47°31′57″N 2°29′18″W
- Country: France
- Region: Brittany
- Department: Morbihan
- Arrondissement: Vannes
- Canton: Muzillac
- Intercommunality: Arc Sud Bretagne

Government
  - Mayor (2026–32): Bernard Monti
- Area^{1}: 5.87 km^{2} (2.27 sq mi)
- Highest elevation: 29 m (95 ft)
- Lowest elevation: 0 m (0 ft)
- Population (2023): 1,066
  - Density: 182/km^{2} (470/sq mi)
- Time zone: UTC+01:00 (CET)
  - Summer (DST): UTC+02:00 (CEST)
- INSEE/Postal code: 56018 /56190
- ^{1} French Land Register data, which excludes lakes, ponds, glaciers > 1 km^{2} (0.386 sq mi or 247 acres) and river estuaries.

Billiers (French pronunciation: [bilje]; Breton: Beler) is a commune in the Morbihan department of Brittany in northwestern France.

== Population ==
Inhabitants of Billiers are called in French Billiotins.

== See also ==
- Communes of the Morbihan department
- Pen Lan Point
