= Noyal-Muzillac =

Noyal-Muzillac Noal-Muzilheg
- Commune
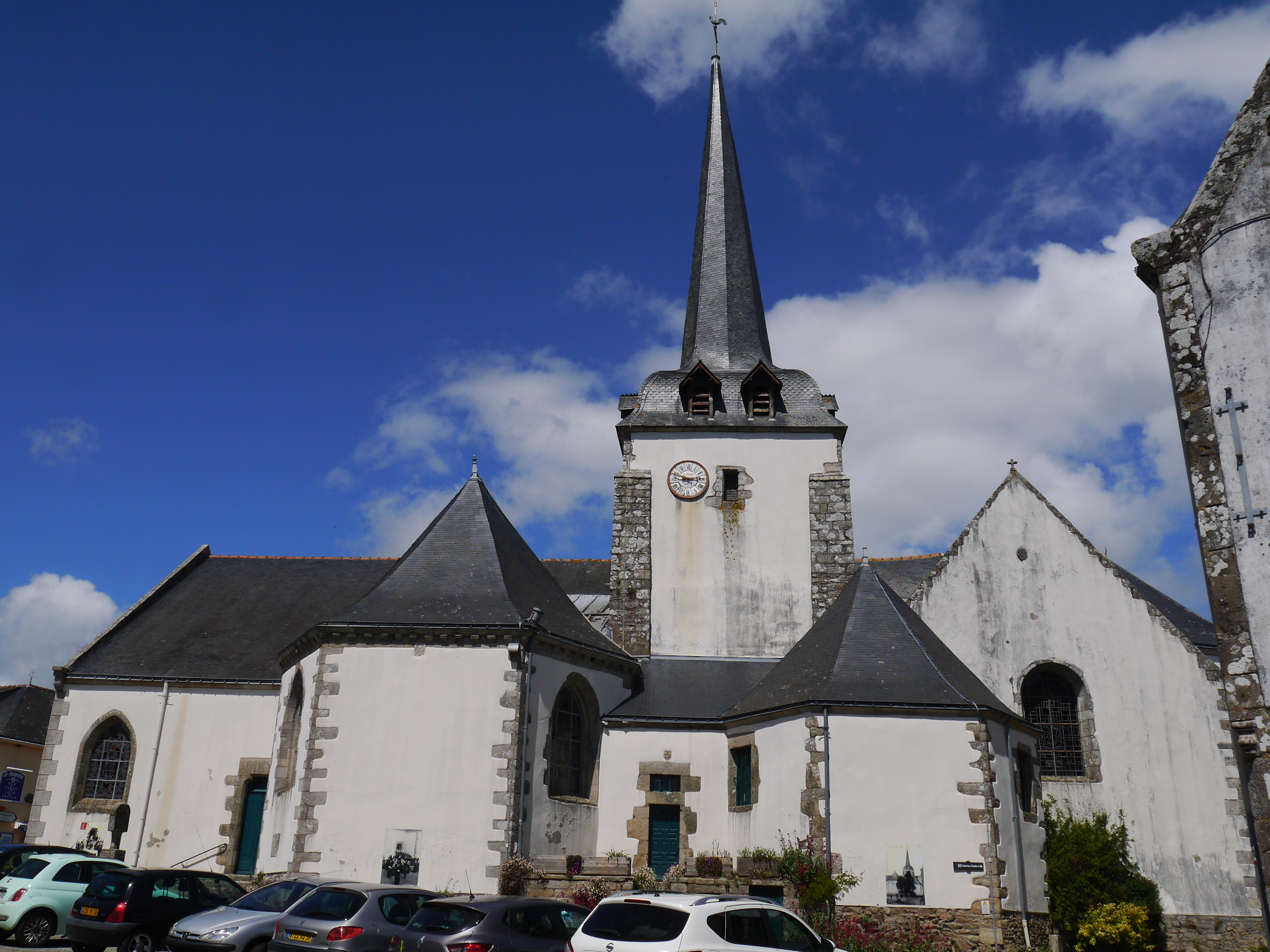
- Church Saint-Martin.

- Coat of arms
- Location of Noyal-Muzillac
- Location within France Location within Brittany
- Coordinates: 47°35′33″N 2°27′19″W
- Country: France
- Region: Brittany
- Department: Morbihan
- Arrondissement: Vannes
- Canton: Muzillac
- Intercommunality: Arc Sud Bretagne

Government
  - Mayor (2026–32): Patrick Beillon
- Area^{1}: 48.89 km^{2} (18.88 sq mi)
- Highest elevation: 87 m (285 ft)
- Lowest elevation: 7 m (23 ft)
- Population (2023): 2,548
  - Density: 52.12/km^{2} (135.0/sq mi)
- Time zone: UTC+01:00 (CET)
  - Summer (DST): UTC+02:00 (CEST)
- INSEE/Postal code: 56149 /56190
- ^{1} French Land Register data, which excludes lakes, ponds, glaciers > 1 km^{2} (0.386 sq mi or 247 acres) and river estuaries.

Noyal-Muzillac (French pronunciation: [nwajal myzijak]; Breton: Noal-Muzilheg) is a commune in the Morbihan department of Brittany in north-western France.

== Population ==
Historical population
| Year | Pop. | ±% p.a. |
|---|---|---|
| 1968 | 1,682 | — |
| 1975 | 1,640 | −0.36% |
| 1982 | 1,772 | +1.11% |
| 1990 | 1,864 | +0.63% |
| 1999 | 1,920 | +0.33% |
| 2007 | 2,277 | +2.15% |
| 2012 | 2,529 | +2.12% |
| 2017 | 2,520 | −0.07% |
| 2023 | 2,548 | +0.18% |
Source: INSEE

Inhabitants of Noyal-Muzillac are called in French Noyalais.

== See also ==
- Communes of the Morbihan department
