= Marzan =

Commune in Brittany, France

Marzan Marzhan
- Commune
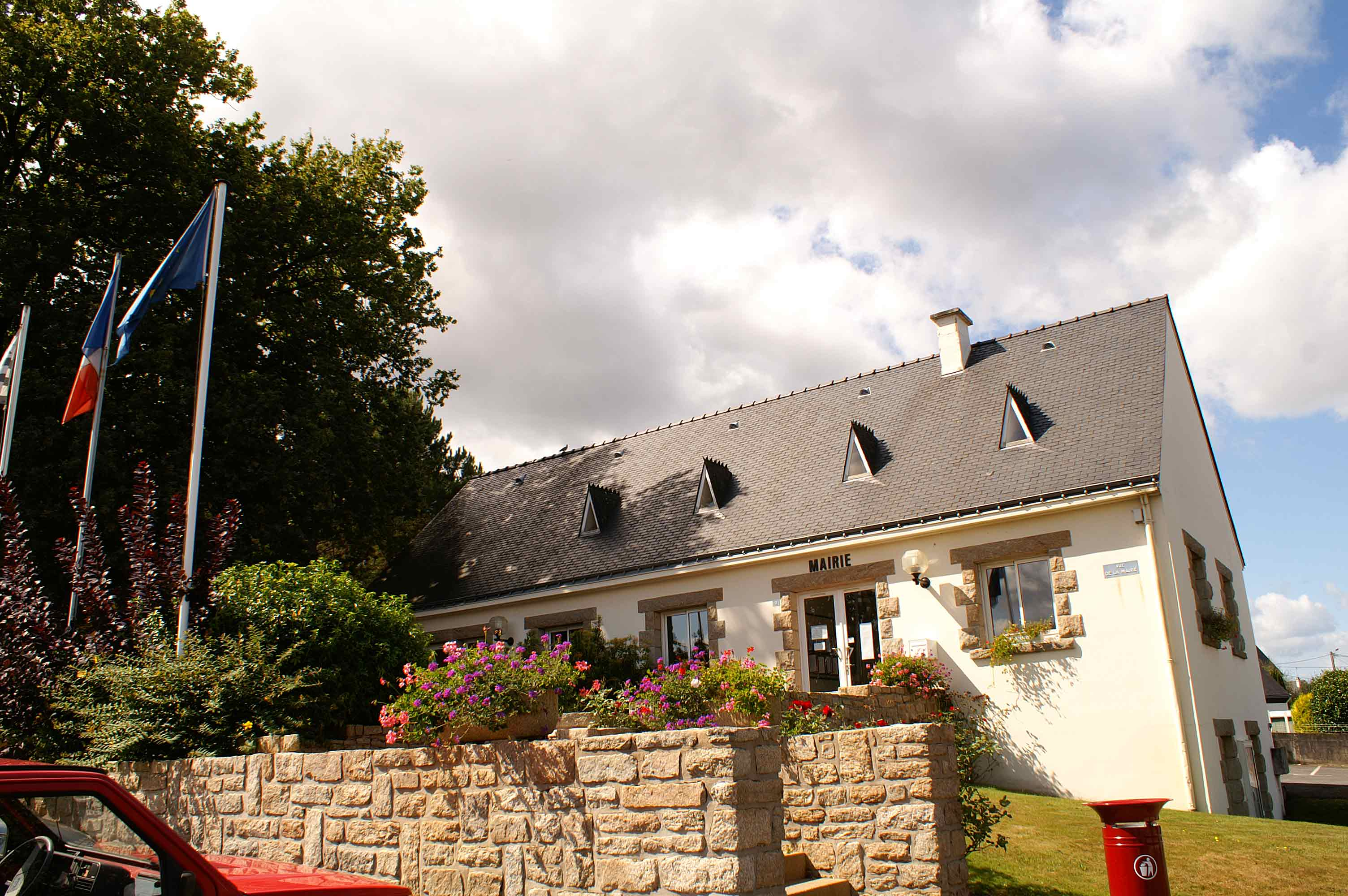
- The town hall in Marzan

- Coat of arms
- Location of Marzan
- Location within France Location within Brittany
- Coordinates: 47°32′30″N 2°19′21″W
- Country: France
- Region: Brittany
- Department: Morbihan
- Arrondissement: Vannes
- Canton: Muzillac
- Intercommunality: Arc Sud Bretagne

Government
  - Mayor (2026–32): Denis Le Ralle
- Area^{1}: 33.84 km^{2} (13.07 sq mi)
- Highest elevation: 83 m (272 ft)
- Lowest elevation: 0 m (0 ft)
- Population (2023): 2,684
  - Density: 79.31/km^{2} (205.4/sq mi)
- Time zone: UTC+01:00 (CET)
  - Summer (DST): UTC+02:00 (CEST)
- INSEE/Postal code: 56126 /56130
- ^{1} French Land Register data, which excludes lakes, ponds, glaciers > 1 km^{2} (0.386 sq mi or 247 acres) and river estuaries.

Marzan (French pronunciation: [maʁzɑ̃]; Breton: Marzhan) is a commune in the Morbihan department of Brittany in north-western France.

== Population ==
Historical population
Year	Pop.	±% p.a.
1968	1,548	—
1975	1,547	−0.01%
1982	1,728	+1.59%
1990	1,736	+0.06%
1999	1,695	−0.27%
2007	1,874	+1.26%
2012	2,170	+2.98%
2017	2,308	+1.24%
2023	2,684	+2.55%
Source: INSEE

Inhabitants of Marzan are called in French Marzannais.

== See also ==
- Communes of the Morbihan department
