= Muzillac =

Muzillac Muzilheg
- Commune
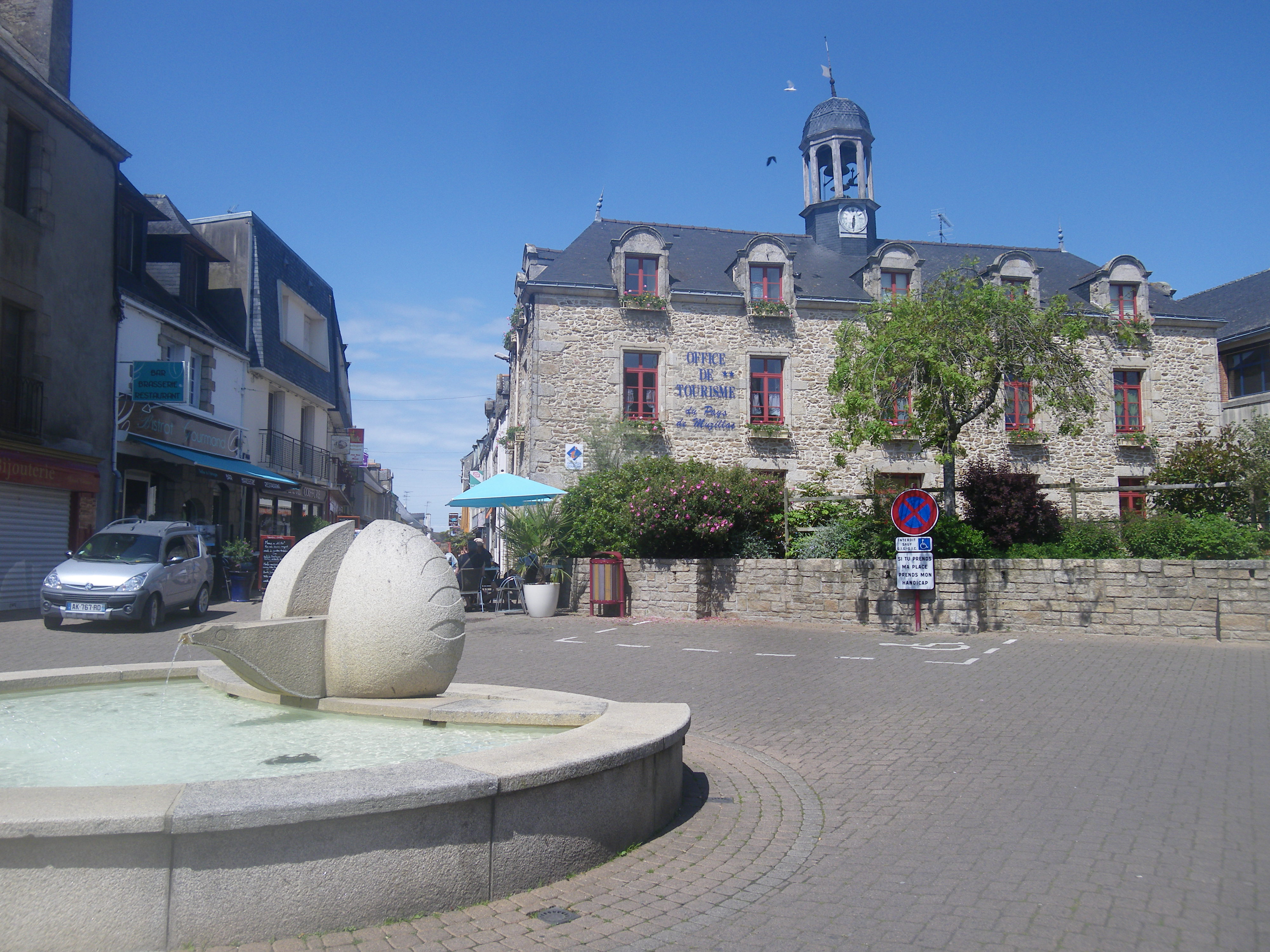
- Muzillac Tourism office.

- Coat of arms
- Location of Muzillac
- Location within France Location within Brittany
- Coordinates: 47°33′14″N 2°28′50″W
- Country: France
- Region: Brittany
- Department: Morbihan
- Arrondissement: Vannes
- Canton: Muzillac
- Intercommunality: Arc Sud Bretagne

Government
  - Mayor (2026–32): Marie-Thérèse Cabon
- Area^{1}: 39.50 km^{2} (15.25 sq mi)
- Highest elevation: 65 m (213 ft)
- Lowest elevation: 0 m (0 ft)
- Population (2023): 5,089
  - Density: 128.8/km^{2} (333.7/sq mi)
- Time zone: UTC+01:00 (CET)
  - Summer (DST): UTC+02:00 (CEST)
- INSEE/Postal code: 56143 /56190
- ^{1} French Land Register data, which excludes lakes, ponds, glaciers > 1 km^{2} (0.386 sq mi or 247 acres) and river estuaries.

Muzillac (French pronunciation: [myzijak]; Breton: Muzilheg) is a commune in the Morbihan department of Brittany in north-western France. Inhabitants of Muzillac are called in French Muzillacais.

The commune is listed as a Village étape.

== Population ==
Historical population
Year	Pop.	±% p.a.
1968	2,516	—
1975	2,987	+2.48%
1982	3,228	+1.11%
1990	3,471	+0.91%
1999	3,805	+1.03%
2007	4,416	+1.88%
2012	4,793	+1.65%
2017	5,015	+0.91%
2023	5,089	+0.24%
Source: INSEE

== See also ==
- Communes of the Morbihan department
- The works of Jean Fréour Sculptor with work in Muzillac church.
