= Guéhenno =

Commune in Brittany, France

Guéhenno Gwezhennoù
- Commune
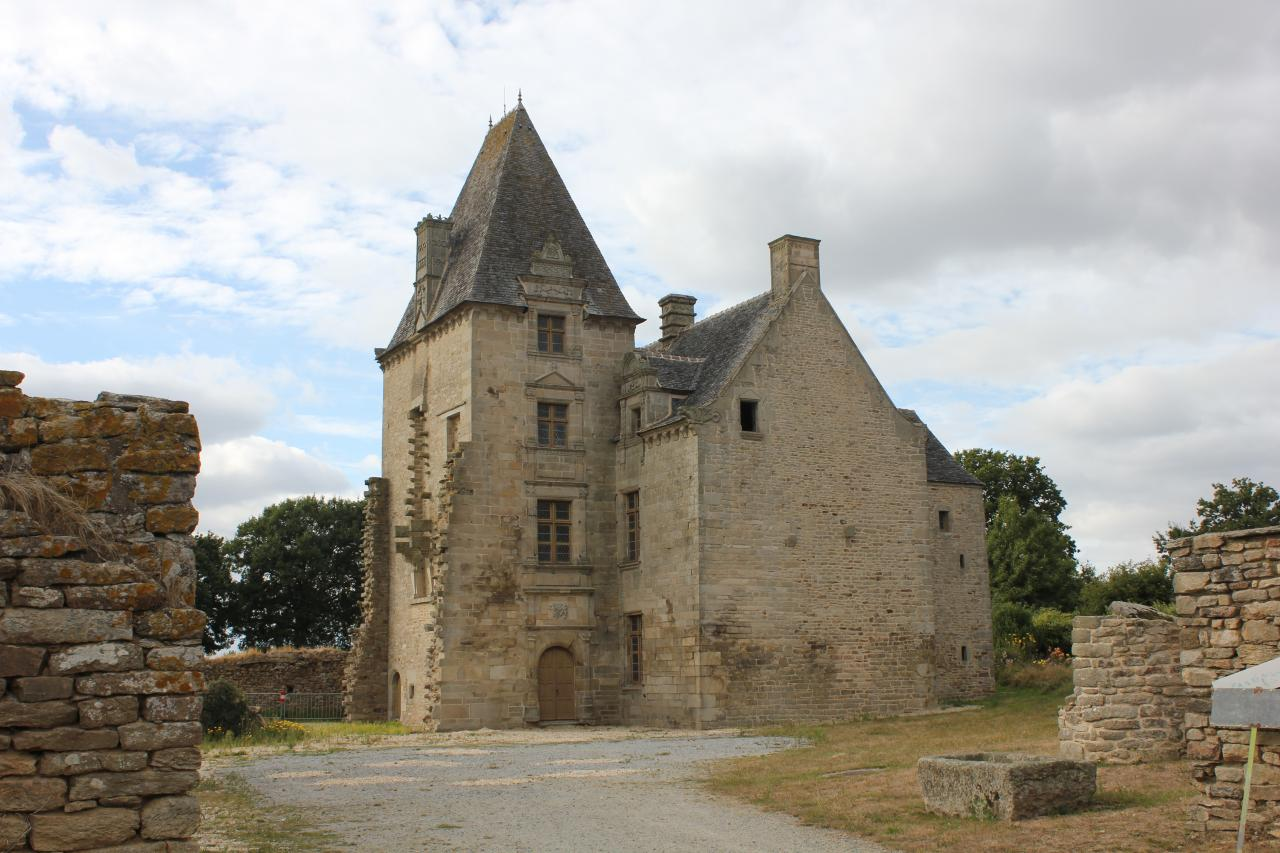
- The manor of Le May, in Guéhenno
- Location of Guéhenno
- Location within France Location within Brittany
- Coordinates: 47°53′34″N 2°38′18″W
- Country: France
- Region: Brittany
- Department: Morbihan
- Arrondissement: Pontivy
- Canton: Moréac
- Intercommunality: Centre Morbihan Communauté

Government
  - Mayor (2026–32): Nolwenn Bauche-Gavaud
- Area^{1}: 23.33 km^{2} (9.01 sq mi)
- Highest elevation: 155 m (509 ft)
- Lowest elevation: 58 m (190 ft)
- Population (2023): 814
  - Density: 34.9/km^{2} (90.4/sq mi)
- Time zone: UTC+01:00 (CET)
  - Summer (DST): UTC+02:00 (CEST)
- INSEE/Postal code: 56071 /56420
- ^{1} French Land Register data, which excludes lakes, ponds, glaciers > 1 km^{2} (0.386 sq mi or 247 acres) and river estuaries.

Guéhenno (French pronunciation: [ɡe.ɛno]; Breton: Gwezhennoù) is a commune in the Morbihan department of Brittany in north-western France.

== Demographics ==
Inhabitants of Guéhenno are called Guéhennotais.

== See also ==
- Communes of the Morbihan department
- Calvary at Guéhenno
