= Ambon, Morbihan =

Commune in Brittany, France

Ambon
- Commune
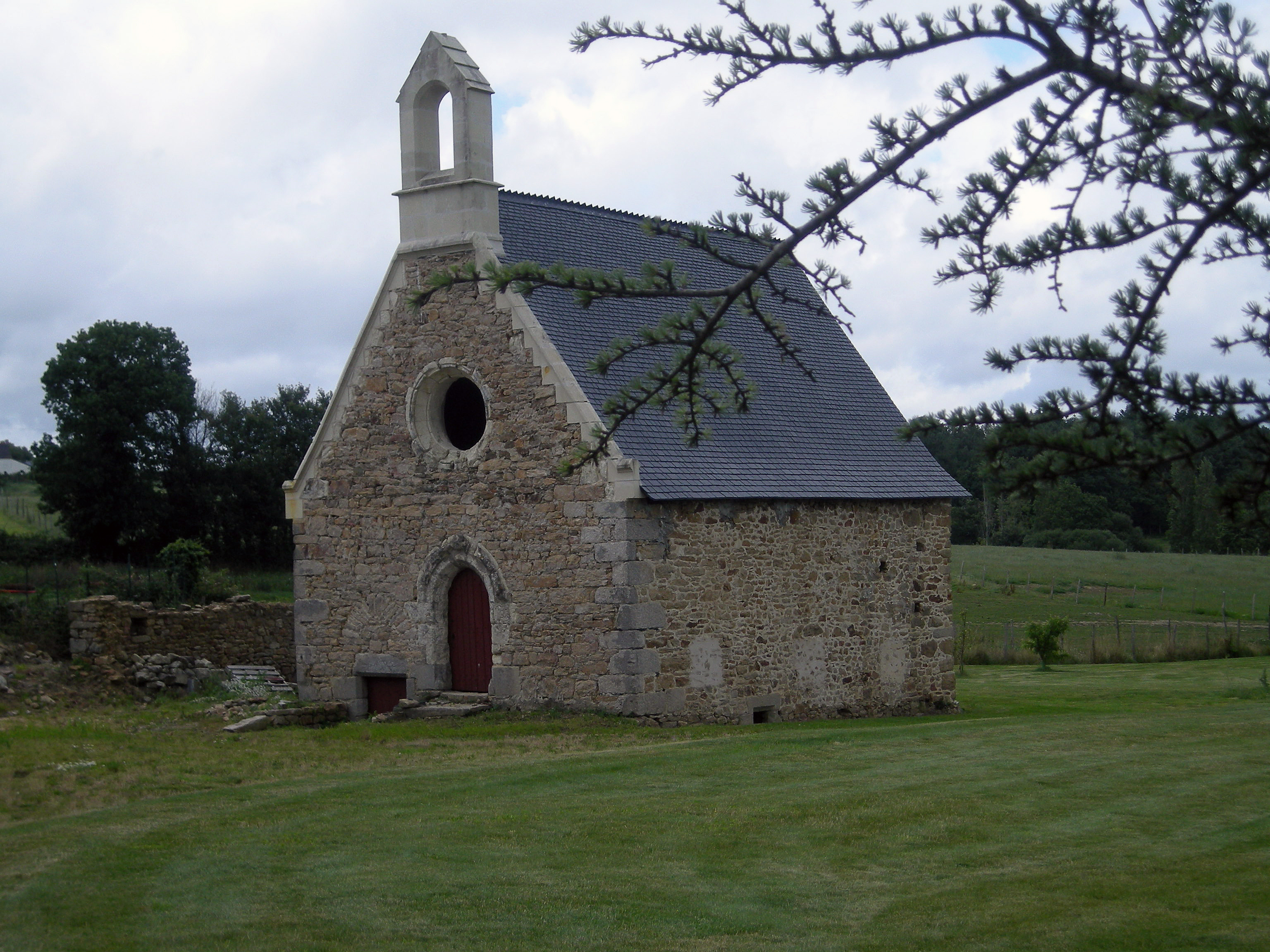
- The Chapelle de Bavalan
- Location of Ambon
- Location within France Location within Brittany
- Coordinates: 47°33′16″N 2°33′18″W
- Country: France
- Region: Brittany
- Department: Morbihan
- Arrondissement: Vannes
- Canton: Muzillac
- Intercommunality: Arc Sud Bretagne

Government
  - Mayor (2026–32): Noël Paul
- Area^{1}: 38.04 km^{2} (14.69 sq mi)
- Highest elevation: 57 m (187 ft)
- Lowest elevation: 0 m (0 ft)
- Population (2023): 2,101
  - Density: 55.23/km^{2} (143.0/sq mi)
- Time zone: UTC+01:00 (CET)
  - Summer (DST): UTC+02:00 (CEST)
- INSEE/Postal code: 56002 /56190
- ^{1} French Land Register data, which excludes lakes, ponds, glaciers > 1 km^{2} (0.386 sq mi or 247 acres) and river estuaries.

Ambon (French pronunciation: [ɑ̃bɔ̃]; Breton: Ambon) is a commune in the Morbihan department in the Brittany region in northwestern France.

== Population ==
Historical population
Year	Pop.	±% p.a.
1968	1,008	—
1975	904	−1.54%
1982	881	−0.37%
1990	1,006	+1.67%
1999	1,255	+2.49%
2007	1,559	+2.75%
2012	1,767	+2.54%
2017	1,817	+0.56%
2023	2,101	+2.45%
Source: INSEE

Inhabitants of Ambon are called Ambonnais in French.

== See also ==
- Communes of the Morbihan department
