= Nivillac =

Nivillac Nivilieg
- Commune
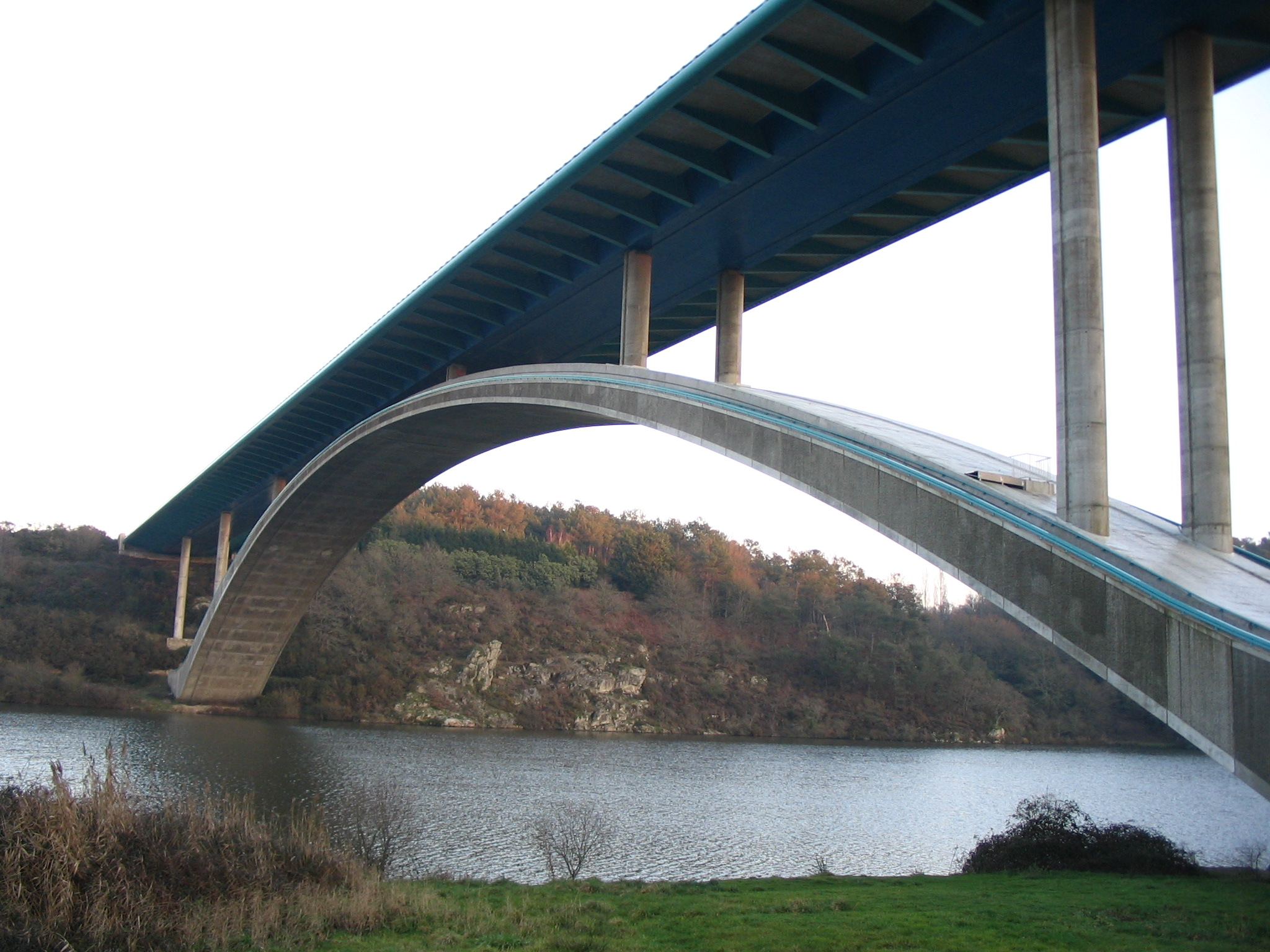
- The Morbihan Bridge

- Coat of arms
- Location of Nivillac
- Location within France Location within Brittany
- Coordinates: 47°32′05″N 2°16′52″W
- Country: France
- Region: Brittany
- Department: Morbihan
- Arrondissement: Vannes
- Canton: Muzillac
- Intercommunality: CC Arc Sud Bretagne

Government
  - Mayor (2026–32): Jérôme Blino
- Area^{1}: 55.48 km^{2} (21.42 sq mi)
- Highest elevation: 71 m (233 ft)
- Lowest elevation: 0 m (0 ft)
- Population (2023): 4,951
  - Density: 89.24/km^{2} (231.1/sq mi)
- Time zone: UTC+01:00 (CET)
  - Summer (DST): UTC+02:00 (CEST)
- INSEE/Postal code: 56147 /56130
- ^{1} French Land Register data, which excludes lakes, ponds, glaciers > 1 km^{2} (0.386 sq mi or 247 acres) and river estuaries.

Nivillac (French pronunciation: [nivijak]; Breton: Nivilieg) is a commune in the Morbihan department and Brittany region of north-western France.

== Population ==
Historical population
Year	Pop.	±% p.a.
1968	2,727	—
1975	2,661	−0.35%
1982	3,103	+2.22%
1990	3,101	−0.01%
1999	3,192	+0.32%
2007	3,766	+2.09%
2012	4,273	+2.56%
2017	4,612	+1.54%
2023	4,951	+1.19%
Source: INSEE

In French the inhabitants of Nivillac are known as Nivillacois.

== See also ==
- Communes of the Morbihan department
