= Damgan =

Commune in Brittany, France

- Commune
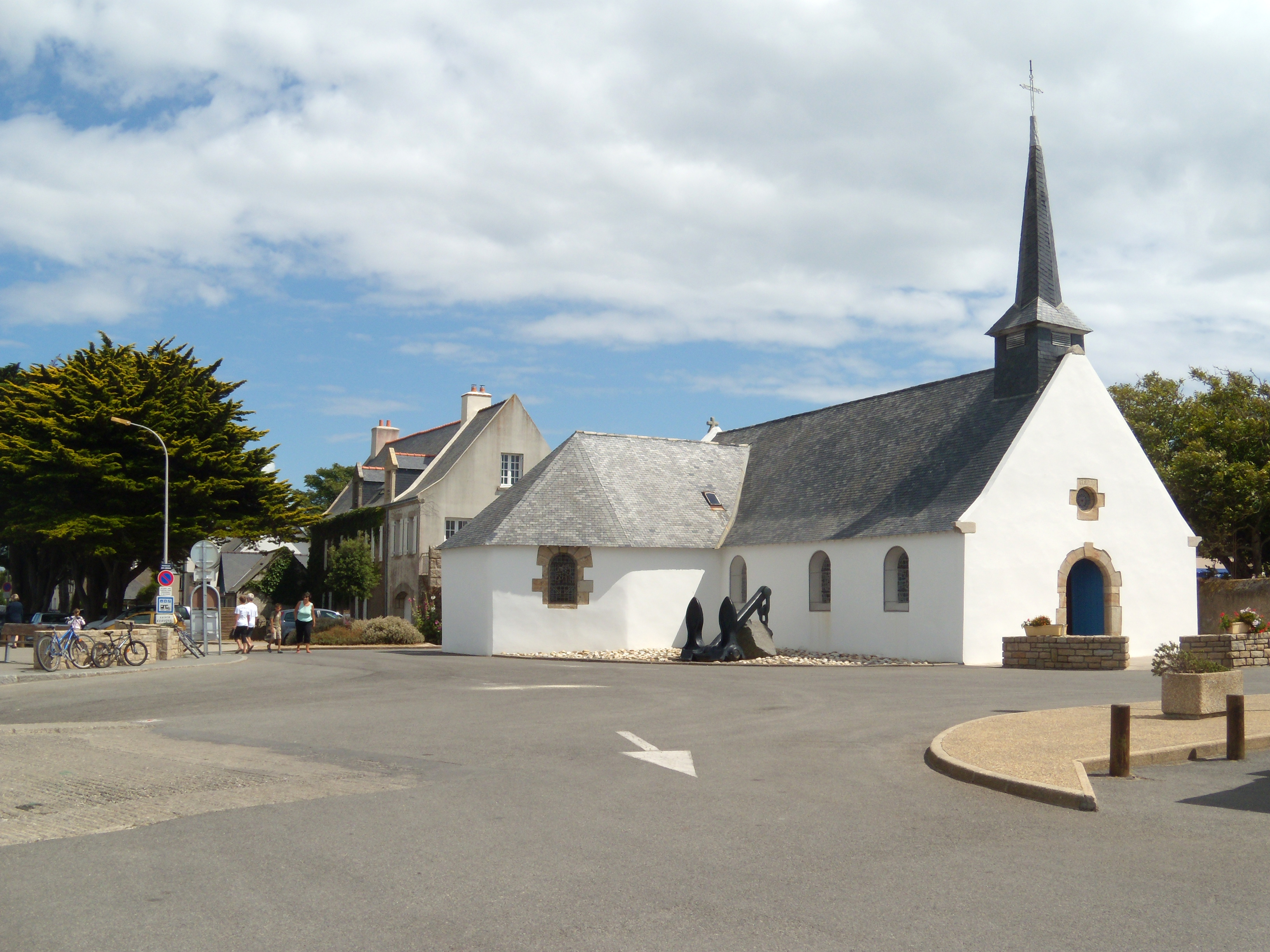
- The church in the village of Pénerf, in Damgan commune

- Coat of arms
- Location of Damgan
- Location within France Location within Brittany
- Coordinates: 47°31′14″N 2°34′36″W
- Country: France
- Region: Brittany
- Department: Morbihan
- Arrondissement: Vannes
- Canton: Muzillac
- Intercommunality: Arc Sud Bretagne

Government
  - Mayor (2026–32): Jean-Marie Colombel
- Area^{1}: 10.16 km^{2} (3.92 sq mi)
- Highest elevation: 20 m (66 ft)
- Lowest elevation: 0 m (0 ft)
- Population (2023): 1,943
  - Density: 191.2/km^{2} (495.3/sq mi)
- Time zone: UTC+01:00 (CET)
  - Summer (DST): UTC+02:00 (CEST)
- INSEE/Postal code: 56052 /56750
- ^{1} French Land Register data, which excludes lakes, ponds, glaciers > 1 km^{2} (0.386 sq mi or 247 acres) and river estuaries.

Damgan (French pronunciation: [damgɑ̃]; Damgan in Breton) is a commune in the Morbihan department of Brittany in north-western France.

== Geography ==
Damgan is a coastal town located on the south coast of Brittany. The town is located 20 km (12 mi) southeast of Vannes. The river Penerf forms a natural boundary to the west. Historically Damgan belongs to Vannetais and Lower Brittany.

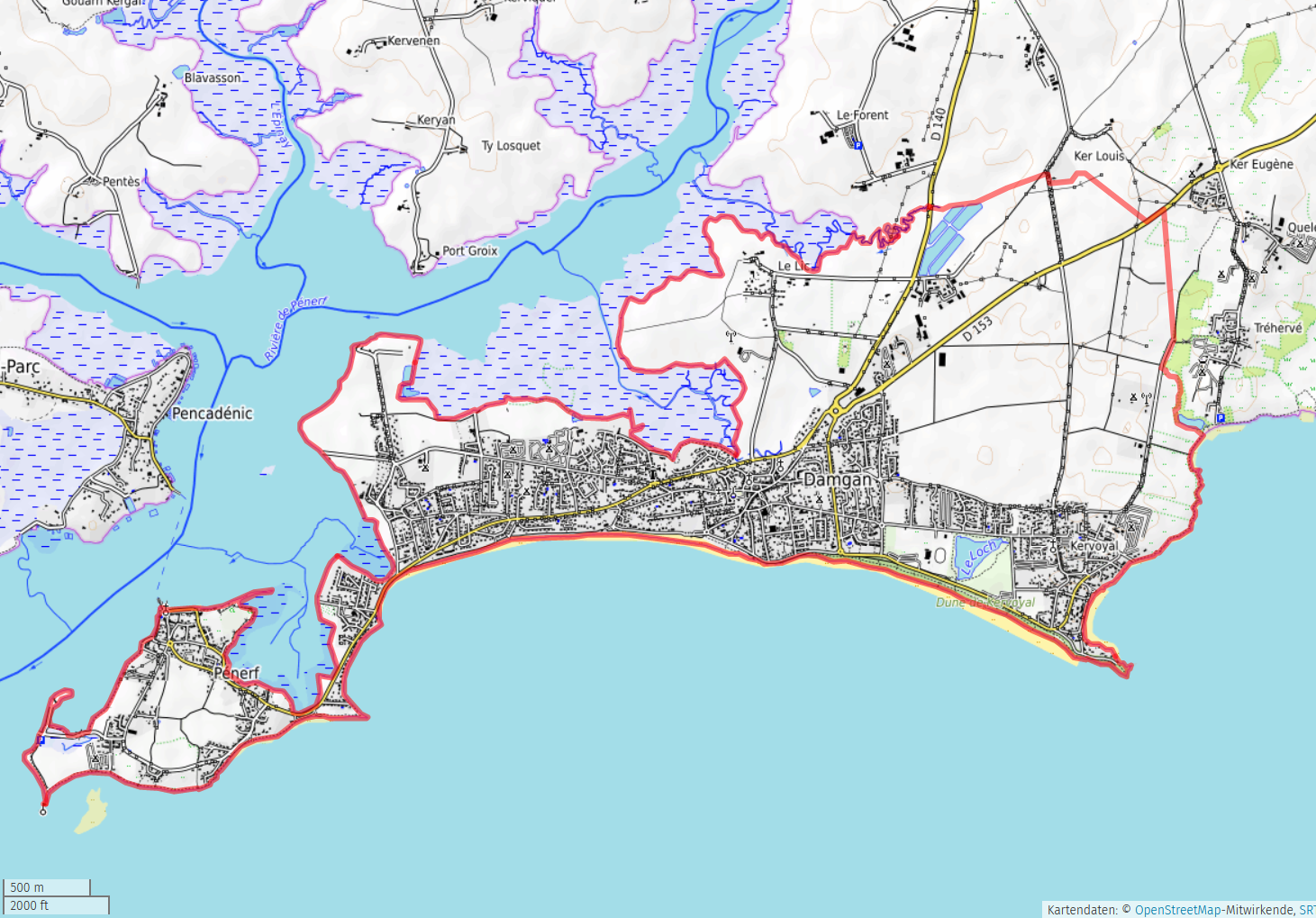
Topographic map

== Population ==
Inhabitants of Damgan are called in French Damganais.

Historical population

Year	Pop.	±% p.a.
1831	1,424	—
1836	1,456	+0.45%
1841	1,399	−0.80%
1846	1,398	−0.01%
1851	1,500	+1.42%
1856	1,534	+0.45%
1861	1,568	+0.44%
1866	1,571	+0.04%
1872	1,500	−0.77%
1876	1,481	−0.32%
1881	1,470	−0.15%
1886	1,325	−2.06%
1891	1,303	−0.33%
1896	1,323	+0.31%
1901	1,229	−1.46%
1906	1,368	+2.17%
1911	1,122	−3.89%

Year	Pop.	±% p.a.
1921	973	−1.41%
1926	909	−1.35%
1931	901	−0.18%
1936	926	+0.55%
1946	930	+0.04%
1954	839	−1.28%
1962	816	−0.35%
1968	814	−0.04%
1975	874	+1.02%
1982	905	+0.50%
1990	1,032	+1.66%
1999	1,327	+2.83%
2007	1,472	+1.30%
2012	1,632	+2.09%
2017	1,702	+0.84%
2023	1,943	+2.23%

Source: EHESS and INSEE (1968-2023)

== Tourism ==
Damgan is a seaside resort. It is a very popular summer destination. As of 2020, 73.5% of the properties are holiday homes, the highest percentage in Morbihan.

== Gallery ==
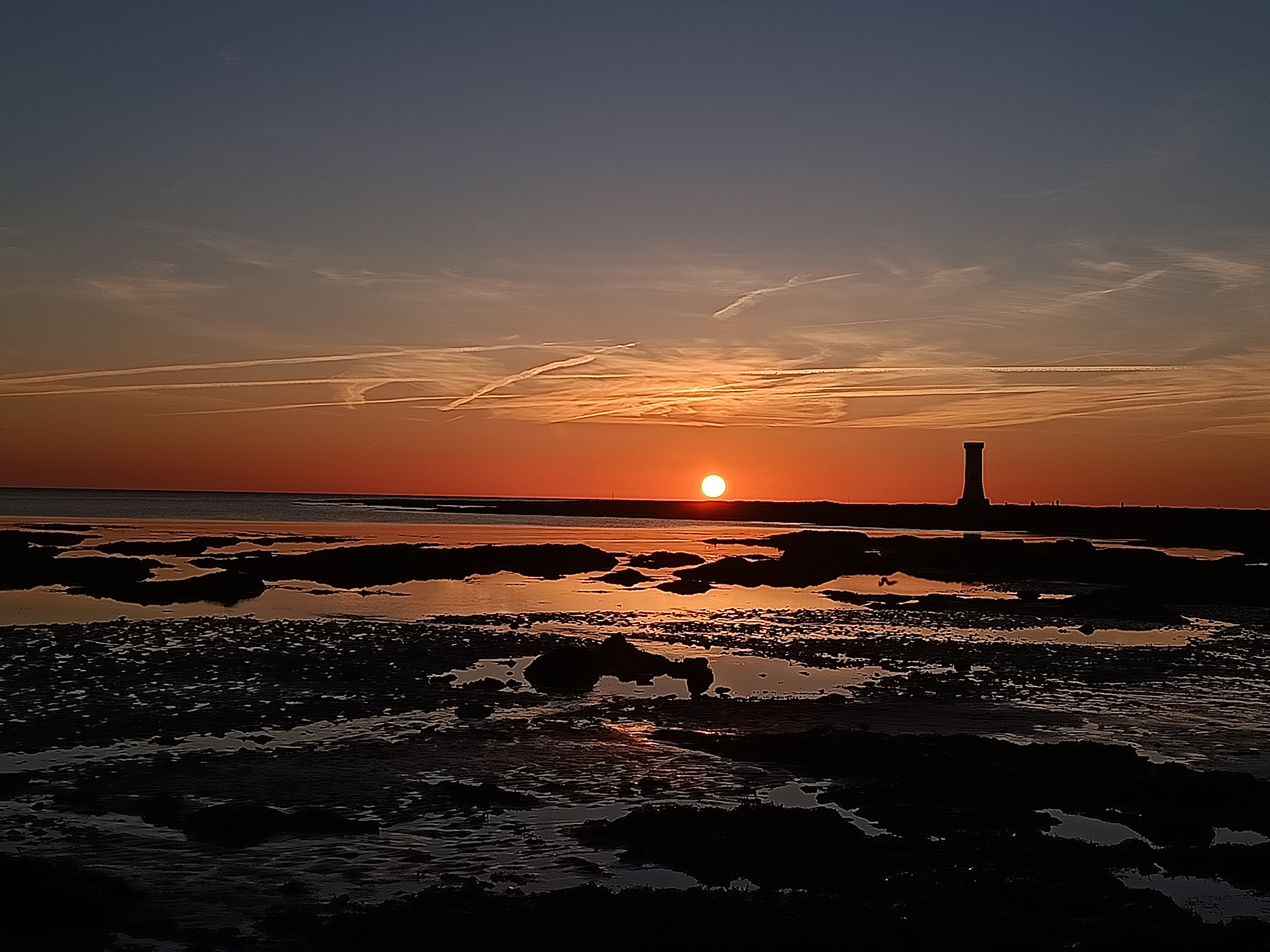
Sunset near La tour des Anglais.

== See also ==
- Communes of the Morbihan department
