= Georges Cochevelou =

- Born: 13 May 1889; Paris, France
- Died: 20 December 1974 (aged 85); Saint-Mandé, France
- Occupations: Civil servant in the French Ministry of Finance musician luthier
- Spouse: Fanny-Julienne Dobroushkess
- Children: 3, including Alan Stivell

Georges Cochevelou (1889–1974) was an interpreter, soldier and banker. He discovered and reconstructed the Celtic harp of the Middle Ages, and, along with his harpist son Alan Stivell, was responsible for its revival in Brittany in the 1950s.

== Early life ==
Georges (Jord or Jorj in Breton) Cochevelou was born on 16 May 1889, in the rue Vercingétorix (Vercingétorix Street) of the 14th arrondissement of Paris. His father was a native of Nouec Vihan in Gourin, and his mother of Pontivy. Georges was baptised in Vannetais territory in the south of Brittany, after which his family moved away from Paris. He was raised for some years by his maternal grandmother in Moustoir-Ac, and lived in Morbihan until he was thirty years old.

== Career ==
He was raised as a speaker of Gwenedeg before he became a soldier in World War I. He was wounded and taken prisoner in Germany in 1917. On Armistice of 11 November 1918, he was in Poland, where he studied Polish and Russian.

After the war he worked as a banker, administrator and interpreter, but his real passion was for the arts. He was a winner in the Lépine competition for several artistic works: he made an "astignomètre" (an ophthalmological device), created a table lamp (sold by Lancel - French leatherwear), built furniture like a cabinetmaker (French polish and marquetry) and painted in an original technique "of water-color in oil" on panels of hardboard painted in white, which were shown at an exhibition of independent artists at the academy of Raymond Duncan.

On 1 August 1932 he married Fanny-Julienne Dobroushkess, native of Baltic states, from which her father, Hain-Woulf Dobroushkess was an emigrant. She gave birth to their son, Jean, in December 1935. On the eve of the Second World War Georges was fifty years old, and although he was over the age limit for his rank (captain of the reserves) and not ably fit, he considered it his duty to answer the call and was allocated to the east army to Épinal and to Saint-Dié. His wife and their son joined him in the spring of 1940. Their second child Yves was born on 18 May 1940 in Épinal. At the beginning of June, the east army started their withdrawal. They travelled for a week before finding a family near Villeneuve-sur-Lot. Georges eventually found employment in Châtel-Guyon where his family lived until autumn 1945.

On 6 January 1944 Alan Cochevelou, the future Alan Stivell, was born. A short time later, the family settled down in Paris again. At that time Georges was working as an English interpreter and contract employee for the Ministry of Finance where he translated documents to French from English, Russian, Polish and Spanish. Fanny was working in the secretarial department of the civic and social Feminine Union, at 25 Rue de Valois. Cochevelou lived for five years in a small apartment on the boulevard of Belleville. They then lived on Rue Marne, then in Vincennes. Georges adopted ideas appropriate to the right-wing middle class, despite he and his family having relatively low incomes. His wife Fanny encouraged him to resume contact with family members remaining in Brittany.

Gradually Georges' interest in Brittany was rekindled, particularly in the Breton movement, of which he had never completely lost sight. One of his passions was in cabinetmaking—he made furniture and musical instruments. Furthermore, he played the piano, the transverse flute and the oboe. He tried to recreate the Celtic harp, an instrument forgotten when the Duchy of Brittany lost its independence, at the end of the Middle Ages. He did research about it in the years 1946-1951, increasing his number of meetings and document retrievals, until finally he produced a prototype based on his personal designs. At the age of sixty three, he brought ambition, passion and perfectionism to this work which began in April 1952 and lasted a year. Fifteen years of work allowed him to create a "perfect and magical harp" according to his son, realizing his dream in the early 1950s. He created, in April 1953, "Telenn gentañ", a harp model equipped with nylon strings. This work was the outcome of much research and calculation.

The sound of this harp, as well as the various performances and the recitals by his son Alan, created an enthusiasm for the harp which caused the revival of the instrument in Brittany in the 1950s. In 1959, he harmonized and arranged the pieces of Alan's first record. He produced about twenty copies which in the Celtic circles of Saint-Malo, Pontivy, Redon. In 1964, he created an instrument inspired by the 15th or 16th century Irish harp, fitted with metallic strings which gave him a tone similar to the twelve-stringed guitar or zither.

Jord died on 20 December 1974 in Saint-Mandé (Val-de-Marne). In 1976, Alan dedicated his album Trema'n Inis ("Towards the island") to Georges. His wife died on 26 September 2005 in Limeil-Brévannes (Val-de-Marne) at the age of 102. Alan paid tribute to her with the song "Over there, over there" on the album Explores in 2006. Both rest in the cemetery of Gourin, following the wishes of Georges.

== Family tree ==
Ancestors of Georges Cochevelou

8. François Cochevelou; (15 November 1785 in Gouloudic – 3 May 1857 in Gourin)
4. François Cochevelou; (22 May 1818 in Gourin – 7 November 1887 in Gourin)
9. Marie Ursule Le Pensec; (9 March 1783 in Gourin – 9 February 1853 in Gourin)
2. François-Pierre-Marie Cochevelou; (29 September 1864 in Nouec Vihan – 10 March 1893 in Pontivy) railway worker in 1889
20. Vincent Coroller
10. Maurice Coroller; (b. 1805 in Gourin)
21. Marie-Josèphe Le Roux
5. Marie Anne Coroller; (b. 25 February 1832 in Gourin)
22. Louis Pasquet
11. Marie-Catherine Pasquet; (d. 15 November 1848 in Gourin)
23. Catherine Le Poulichet
1. Georges Cochevelou; (13 May 1889 in Paris – 20 December 1974 in Saint-Mandé) civil servant in the French Ministry of Finance
8. François Lintanff; (28 May 1844 in Mûr-de-Bretagne)
6. François Lintanff; (3 July 1806 in Plouaret – 25 May 1868 in Mûr-de-Bretagne)
26. Guillaume Boscher; (1 March 1786 in Uzel - 9 October 1850 in Mûr-de-Bretagne)
9. Suzanne Boscher; (7 April 1810 in Mûr-de-Bretagne – 1 January 1867 in Mûr-de-Bretagne)
27. Marie Le Fresne; (24 March 1784 in Saint-Guen (Kergauton) - 26 November 1836 in Mûr-de-Bretagne)
3. Anne-Marie-Eulalie Lintanff; (b. 25 March 1869 in Pontivy)
28. Hypolite Schutz; (20 December 1822 in Saint-Hippolyte, Haut-Rhin)
14. Hypolite Schutz; (20 February 1812 in Saint-Hippolyte, Haut-Rhin – 16 August 1860 in Hennebont)
29. Béatrix Comte; (23 February 1785 in Saint-Hippolyte, Haut-Rhin - 25 November 1842 in Saint-Hippolyte, Haut-Rhin)
7. Eléonore Schutz; (8 April 1810 in Mûr-de-Bretagne – 18 January 1867 in Mûr-de-Bretagne)
30. Joseph Le Denmat; (25 June 1786 in Malguénac - 21 August 1823 in Vic, Spain)
15. Françoise Le Denmat; (19 August 1815 in Malguénac – 30 December 1849 in Rennes)
31. Yvonne Jéhanno; (22 April 1795 in Guern)
