= Malguénac =

Commune in Brittany, France

Malguénac Malgeneg
- Commune
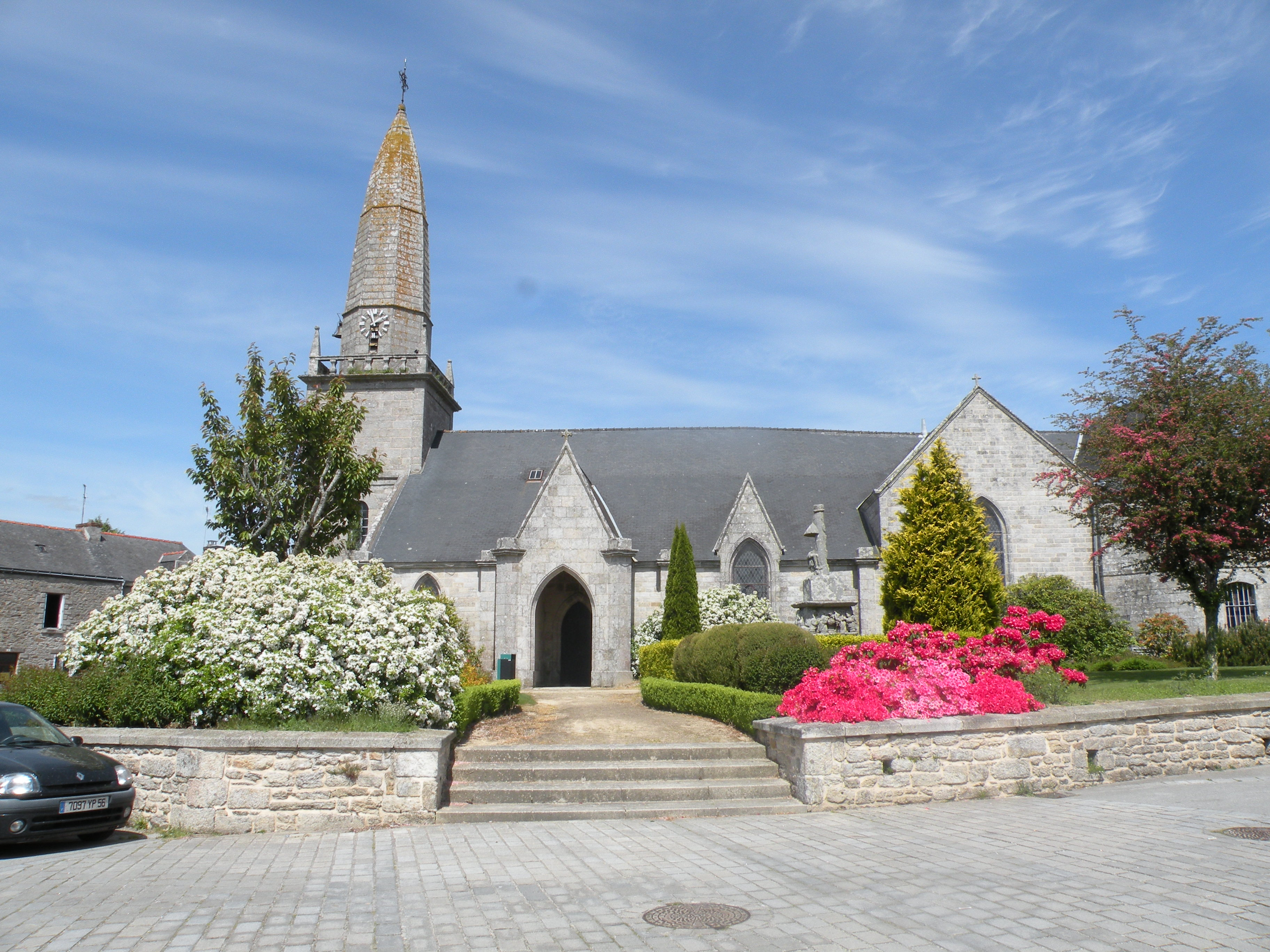
- The parish church in Malguénac
- Location of Malguénac
- Location within France Location within Brittany
- Coordinates: 48°04′53″N 3°03′39″W
- Country: France
- Region: Brittany
- Department: Morbihan
- Arrondissement: Pontivy
- Canton: Gourin
- Intercommunality: Pontivy Communauté

Government
  - Mayor (2026–32): Olivier Guegan
- Area^{1}: 38.45 km^{2} (14.85 sq mi)
- Highest elevation: 222 m (728 ft)
- Lowest elevation: 73 m (240 ft)
- Population (2023): 1,857
  - Density: 48.30/km^{2} (125.1/sq mi)
- Time zone: UTC+01:00 (CET)
  - Summer (DST): UTC+02:00 (CEST)
- INSEE/Postal code: 56125 /56300
- ^{1} French Land Register data, which excludes lakes, ponds, glaciers > 1 km^{2} (0.386 sq mi or 247 acres) and river estuaries.

Malguénac (French pronunciation: [malɡenak]; Breton: Malgeneg) is a commune in the Morbihan department of Brittany in north-western France.

== Geography ==
The village centre is located 6 km (3.7 mi) west of Pontivy, 44 km (27 mi) northeast of Lorient and 52 km (32 mi) northwest of Vannes. Malguénac is border by Cléguérec to the north, by Séglien to the west, by Guern to the south and by Pontivy and Le Sourn to the east. Apart from the village centre, there are many hamlets in the commune. Historically, Malguénac belongs to Vannetais.

== Demographics ==
Inhabitants of Malguénac are called in French Malguénacois. After having declined for a long time, the population of the municipality has been increasing steadily since 1975.

Historical population

Year	Pop.	±% p.a.
1793	1,730	—
1800	1,842	+0.90%
1806	1,679	−1.53%
1821	1,596	−0.34%
1831	2,009	+2.33%
1836	1,960	−0.49%
1841	1,957	−0.03%
1846	2,059	+1.02%
1851	1,976	−0.82%
1856	1,868	−1.12%
1861	1,838	−0.32%
1866	1,822	−0.17%
1872	1,657	−1.57%
1876	1,674	+0.26%
1881	1,648	−0.31%
1886	1,675	+0.33%
1891	1,687	+0.14%
1896	1,736	+0.57%
1901	1,717	−0.22%

Year	Pop.	±% p.a.
1906	1,753	+0.42%
1911	1,751	−0.02%
1921	1,780	+0.16%
1926	1,682	−1.13%
1931	1,660	−0.26%
1936	1,514	−1.82%
1946	1,366	−1.02%
1954	1,237	−1.23%
1962	1,214	−0.23%
1968	1,076	−1.99%
1975	1,194	+1.50%
1982	1,419	+2.50%
1990	1,631	+1.76%
1999	1,657	+0.18%
2007	1,733	+0.56%
2012	1,761	+0.32%
2017	1,843	+0.91%
2023	1,857	+0.13%

Source: EHESS and INSEE (1968-2023)

== Map ==
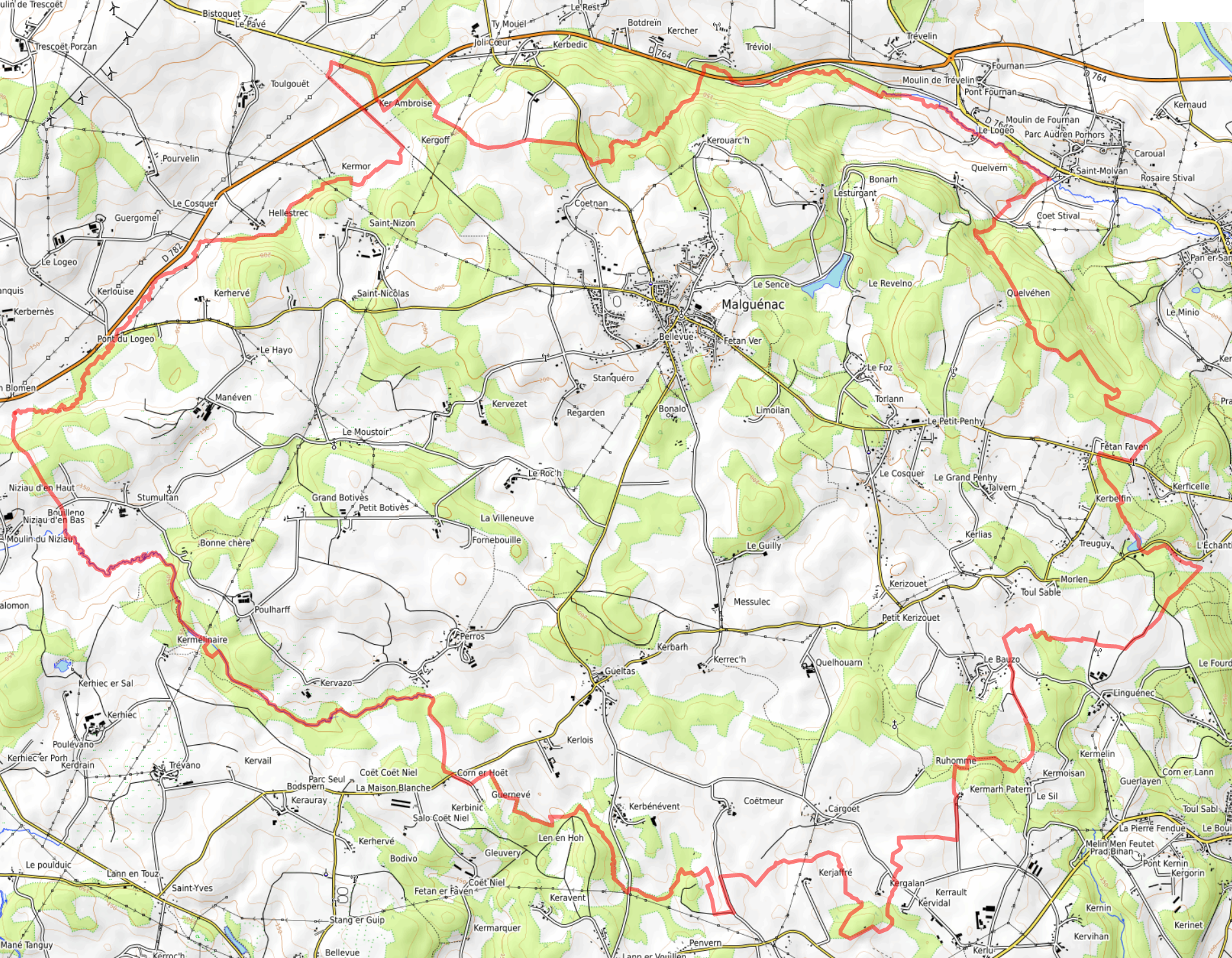
Topographic map

== History ==
An epidemic of plague caused several deaths between March and October 1598 in the parish.

== See also ==
- Communes of the Morbihan department
