= Danielle Gourevitch =

French medical historian and classicist (1941–2021)

- Born: Danielle Leherpeux; 21 Jan 1941; Pluméliau
- Died: 13 June 2021

Academic work
- Discipline: Medical historian

Danielle Gourevitch (21 January 1941 – 13 June 2021) was a French medical historian and classicist.

== Early life and education ==
Born Danielle Leherpeux in Pluméliau (Morbihan), Gourevitch attended the École normale supérieure de jeunes filles in Sèvres.

== Career ==
From 1989 to 2008, the year of her retirement, Gourevitch served as the director of studies and chair of medical history for the École pratique des hautes études. While in this position, she specialised in teaching ancient Greek and Roman and nineteenth-century medicine. In 2002, she was made a member of the Institute for Advanced Study in Princeton, New Jersey.

== Recognition ==
Gourevitch became a corresponding member of the International Academy of the History of Science in 1995, and a full member in 1999. In 2008, a festschrift was published in her honour entitled Femmes en médecine: actes de la journée internationale d'étude organisée à l"Université René-Descartes-Paris V, le 17 Mars 2006 en l'honneur de Danielle Gourevitch, edited by Véronique Boudon-Millot, Véronique Dasen, and Brigitte Maire and based on a study day also held in her honour.

== Personal life ==
In 1961, Gourevitch married Michel Gourevitch, a psychiatrist. The couple had two sons named Alexandre and Raphaël.

== Selected publications ==
=== Books ===
- (1984) Le mal d’être femme: La femme et la medécine dans la Rome antique. Paris: Les Belles Lettres. ISBN 2-251-33803-9.
- (1984) Le triangle hippocratique dans le monde gréco-romain. Le malade, sa maladie et son médecin. Rome: École française de Rome. ISBN 2-7283-0064-X.
- (2001, with Marie-Thérèse Raepsaet-Charlier) La femme dans la Rome antique. Paris: Hachette. ISBN 2-01-235310-X.
- (2011) Pour une archéologie de la médecine romaine. Collection Pathographie, 8. Paris: De Boccard. ISBN 9782701803029
- (2013) Limos kai loimos. A study of the Galenic Plague. Paris: De Boccard. ISBN 9782701803364.

=== Edited volumes ===
- (1992) Maladie et maladies. Histoire et conceptualisation. Mélanges en l’honneur de Mirko Grmek. Geneva: Librairie Droz.
- (1995) Histoire de la médecine. Leçons méthodologiques. Paris: Ellipses. ISBN 2-7298-9568-X.
- (1995) Médecins érudits de Coray à Sigerist. Actes du colloque de Saint-Julien-en-Beaujolais (juin 1994). Paris: De Boccard, Paris. ISBN 2-7018-0095-1.
