= Sandra Boehringer =

French historian (born 1972)

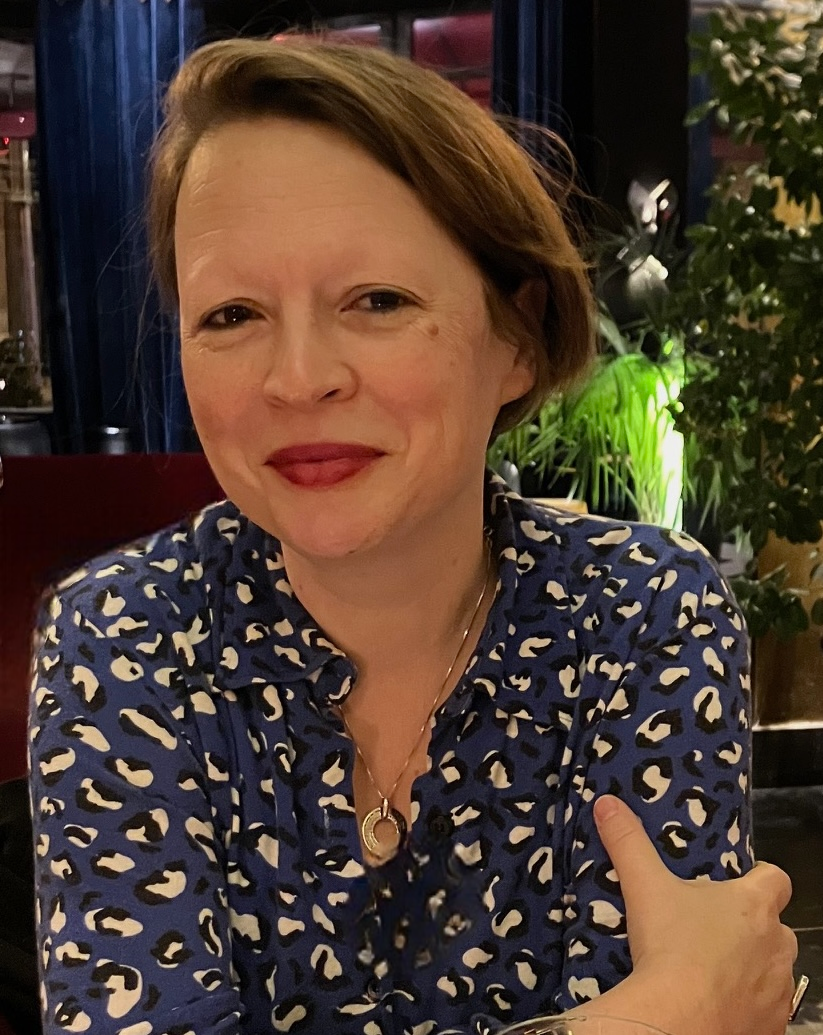
- Boehringer in 2024
- Born: 1972 (age 53–54); Casablanca, Morocco
- Citizenship: France

Academic background
- Education: School for Advanced Studies in the Social Sciences (PhD)
- Doctoral advisor: Luc Brisson

Academic work
- Discipline: Historian
- Sub-discipline: Ancient Greece, sexuality
- Institutions: University of Strasbourg
- Notable works: L'homosexualité féminine dans l'Antiquité grecque et romaine (2007)

Sandra Boehringer (born 1972) is a French historian, writer and educator who specialises in the history of sexuality, women and gender in classical Greece.

== Biography ==
Boehringer was born in 1972 in Casablanca, Morocco. Boehringer took the Agrégation de Lettres classiques examination in 1996. She studied at the School for Advanced Studies in the Social Sciences, where her PhD was supervised by Luc Brisson, graduating in 2003.

Boehringer's first publication explored the life and work of Dika, a student of the Ancient Greek lyric poet Sappho.

In 2007, Boehringer's book L'homosexualité féminine dans l'Antiquité grecque et romaine (Female homosexuality in ancient Greece and Rome) was published by French publisher Les Belles Lettres, who are known for publishing Greek and Latin classics. The work is based on her PhD thesis and "argues for the presence of an ancient Greek and Roman discourse about female–female sexual behaviour". It has been translated into English by Anna Perger in 2021.

Weeks after the book's release, Michel Desgranges, chairman of the publisher, wrote an op-ed criticizing the publication as "feminist propaganda". In his opinion, gender studies were an American import that undermined the study of history of sexuality, and the book itself made a mockery of Foucault's work. Desgranges' successor as CEO, Caroline Noirot removed the text from the Belles Lettres' website. Boehringer faced criticism while writing the book itself, including from peers such as Danielle Gourevitch who felt that the book "siding with homosexuality" might contribute to "the destruction of society".

In her 2021, Jessica Wright noted that while the book was significant in the field, its use of the term "homosexuality" was somewhat outdated, focusing on relationships between people assigned female at birth, leaving less space for gender expression.

Boehringer has also published on French philosopher Michel Foucault.

Boehringer is a lecturer in Greek history at the University of Strasbourg. She is an associate member of ANHIMA (French: Anthropologie et Histoire des Mondes Antiques).

== Select publications ==
- Dika, élève de Sappho, Lesbos, 600 av. J.C, Paris: Éditions Autrement, 1999.
- L'homosexualité féminine dans l'Antiquité grecque et romaine, Paris: Les Belles Lettres, 2007, preface by David Halperin.
  - Translated into English as: Female homosexuality in ancient Greece and Rome, 2021, by Anna Perger.
- Foucault, la Sexualité, l'Antiquité, co-edited with Daniele Lorenzini, Paris: Éditions Kimé, 2016.
  - Translated into English as: Foucault, Sexuality, Antiquity, London: Routledge, 2022.
- La Sexualité antique, une histoire moderne, Paris: Éditions Epel, 2025.

Boehringer has also contributed to the Oxford Classical Dictionary on the topic of "female homosexuality." She is a member of the reading committees of the academic journals Clio, Genre, sexualité & société, and Interrogations?
