= Bieuzy =

Commune in Morbihan, France

Bieuzy Bieuzhi-an-Dour
- Part of Pluméliau-Bieuzy
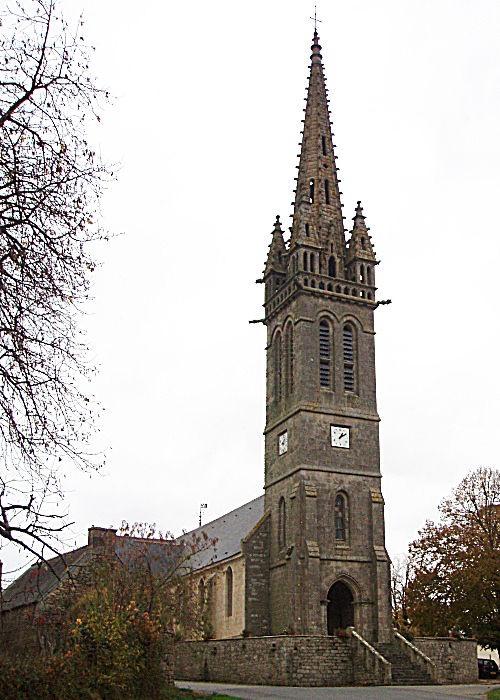
- The church in Bieuzy
- Location of Bieuzy
- Location within France Location within Brittany
- Coordinates: 47°59′00″N 3°03′46″W
- Country: France
- Region: Brittany
- Department: Morbihan
- Arrondissement: Pontivy
- Canton: Pontivy
- Commune: Pluméliau-Bieuzy
- Area^{1}: 18.98 km^{2} (7.33 sq mi)
- Highest elevation: 176 m (577 ft)
- Lowest elevation: 37 m (121 ft)
- Population (2018): 776
  - Density: 40.9/km^{2} (106/sq mi)
- Time zone: UTC+01:00 (CET)
  - Summer (DST): UTC+02:00 (CEST)
- Postal code: 56310
- ^{1} French Land Register data, which excludes lakes, ponds, glaciers > 1 km^{2} (0.386 sq mi or 247 acres) and river estuaries.

Bieuzy (French pronunciation: [bjøzi]; Breton: Bizhui-an-Dour) is a former commune in the Morbihan department in Brittany in northwestern France. On 1 January 2019, it was merged into the new commune Pluméliau-Bieuzy. Inhabitants of Bieuzy are called Bieuzyates.

== Sights ==
=== Prehistoric vestige ===
- Dolmen of Kermabon.

=== Church and chapels ===
- Notre-Dame, 16th century, in the form of a Latin cross.
- The chapel of Saint Gildas 16th century. Situated on the banks of the Blavet River, the chapel leans against an enormous rock which hangs over it. There is the natural grotto in which Saint Gildas may have taken shelter on his arrival from Cornwall in England. He is thought to have shared his hermitage with his disciple Bieuzy.
- The chapel of the Trinité (Trinity) at Castenec.
- The chapel of Saint-Samson, 16th century.
- the chapel of the Vraie-Croix (True Cross), 16th century.

=== Fountain ===
- The fountain of Saint Bieuzy, 16th century.

=== Mill ===
- The flour mill of Rimaison.

=== Curiosities ===
- Ruins of the chateau of Rimaison, 16th century.
- The chateau of Kerven (the ruins were still visible in 1845).
- Seigneurial houses at Bourg, 16th and 17th centuries.
- The Gallic stele of Castennec.
- Medieval tombstone, 13th century, discovered in 1971.

=== Memorial ===
- This memorial, located near the Gulf of Rimaison, is in memory of 14 Resistance fighters and French parachutists who were shot and killed at this spot on 18 July 1944.

== See also ==
- Communes of the Morbihan department
