= Kerfourn =

Commune in Brittany, France

Kerfourn Kerforn
- Commune
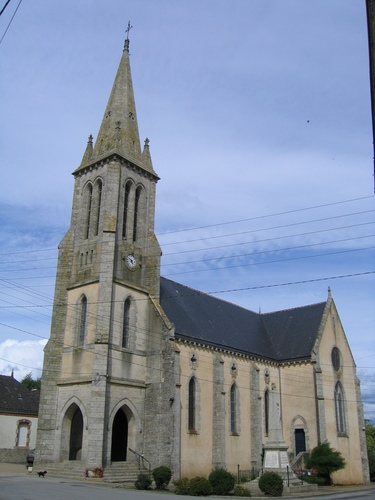
- Church Saint-Éloi-and-Saint-Vincent.

- Coat of arms
- Location of Kerfourn
- Location within France Location within Brittany
- Coordinates: 48°02′38″N 2°49′56″W
- Country: France
- Region: Brittany
- Department: Morbihan
- Arrondissement: Pontivy
- Canton: Pontivy
- Intercommunality: Pontivy Communauté

Government
  - Mayor (2026–32): Laëtitia Brizoual
- Area^{1}: 19.46 km^{2} (7.51 sq mi)
- Highest elevation: 138 m (453 ft)
- Lowest elevation: 92 m (302 ft)
- Population (2023): 852
  - Density: 43.8/km^{2} (113/sq mi)
- Time zone: UTC+01:00 (CET)
  - Summer (DST): UTC+02:00 (CEST)
- INSEE/Postal code: 56092 /56920
- ^{1} French Land Register data, which excludes lakes, ponds, glaciers > 1 km^{2} (0.386 sq mi or 247 acres) and river estuaries.

Kerfourn (French pronunciation: [kɛʁfuʁn]; Breton: Kerforn) is a commune in the Morbihan department of Brittany in north-western France. It is around 8 km east of Pontivy. Inhabitants of Kerfourn are called Kerfournois.

== Governance ==
The first mayor from 1841 to 1871 was Mathurin le Guernic. The current mayor is Laëtitia Brizoual, elected in 2026.

== Landmarks ==
- Church Saint-Eloi-and-Saint-Vincent
- Fountain Saint-Eloi
- Fountain Saint-Vincent
- Calvary of Guerdaner
- Great Calvary
- Calvary of Pembual

== Heraldry ==
Coat of arms of Kerfourn	Party: 1st vert a silver oven masoned and open sable, 2nd gules a reversed horseshoe or; all surmounted by a chief argent charged with three ermine spots sable. Created by Ms. Kergen and Messrs. Binon and Jehanno. Adopted on November 8, 2012.

== See also ==
- Communes of the Morbihan department
