= Pluméliau =

Commune in Morbihan, France

Pluméliau Pluniav
- Part of Pluméliau-Bieuzy
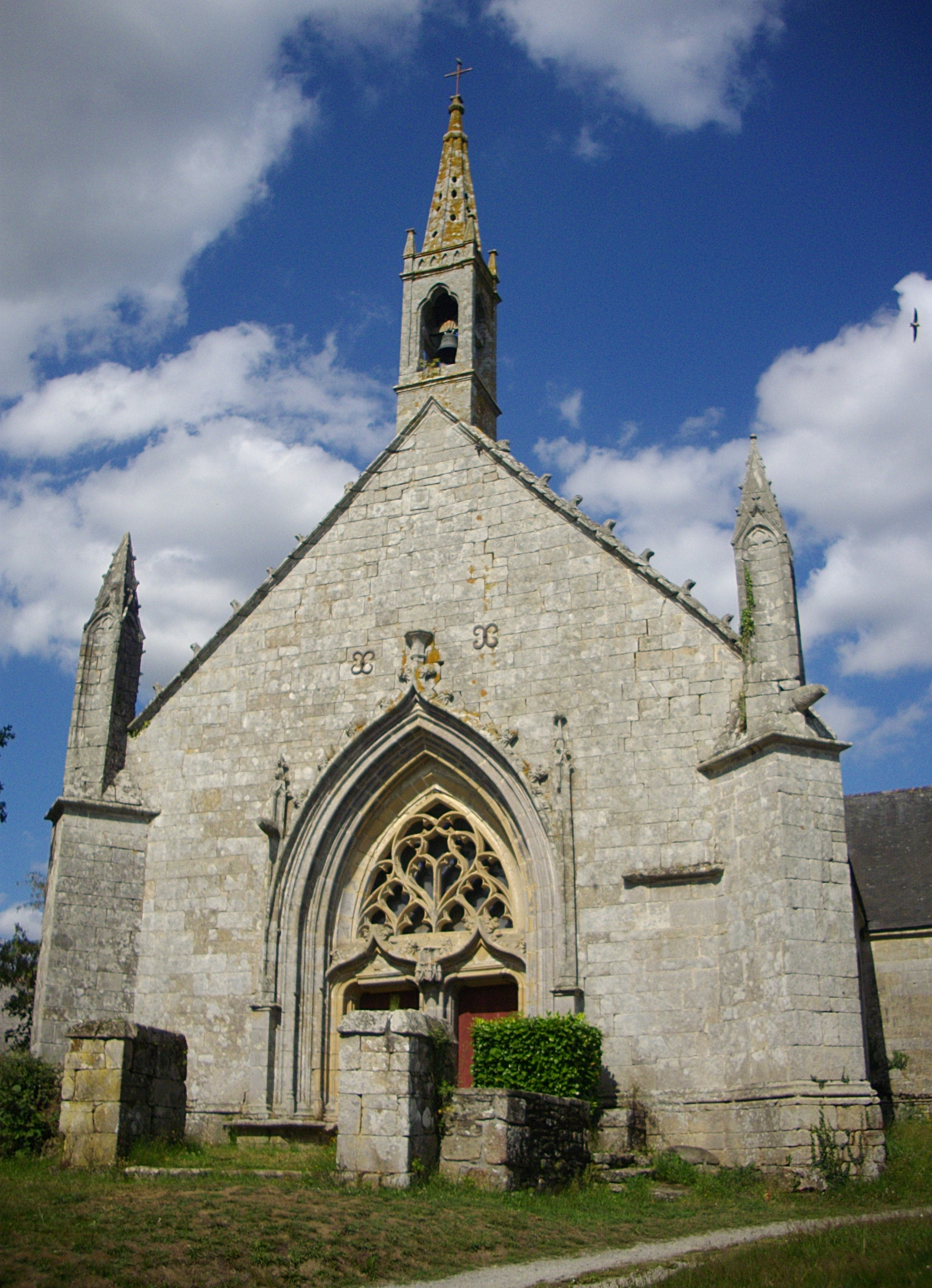
- The Chapel of Saint-Nicolas-des-Eaux, in Pluméliau

- Coat of arms
- Location of Pluméliau
- Location within France Location within Brittany
- Coordinates: 47°57′30″N 2°58′20″W
- Country: France
- Region: Brittany
- Department: Morbihan
- Arrondissement: Pontivy
- Canton: Pontivy
- Commune: Pluméliau-Bieuzy
- Area^{1}: 67.72 km^{2} (26.15 sq mi)
- Highest elevation: 152 m (499 ft)
- Lowest elevation: 33 m (108 ft)
- Population (2016): 3,624
  - Density: 53.51/km^{2} (138.6/sq mi)
- Time zone: UTC+01:00 (CET)
  - Summer (DST): UTC+02:00 (CEST)
- Postal code: 56930
- ^{1} French Land Register data, which excludes lakes, ponds, glaciers > 1 km^{2} (0.386 sq mi or 247 acres) and river estuaries.

Pluméliau (French pronunciation: [plymeljo]; Breton: Pluniav) is a former commune in the Morbihan department of Brittany in north-western France. On 1 January 2019, it was merged into the new commune Pluméliau-Bieuzy.

== Geography ==
The ruisseau de Kergouët forms part of the commune's eastern border, then flows into the Ével, which forms its south-eastern border.

== Demographics ==
Inhabitants of Pluméliau are called in French Plumelois.

== See also ==
- Communes of the Morbihan department
- Henri Gouzien, sculptor of Pluméliau War Memorial
