= Gourin =

Commune in Brittany, France

- Commune
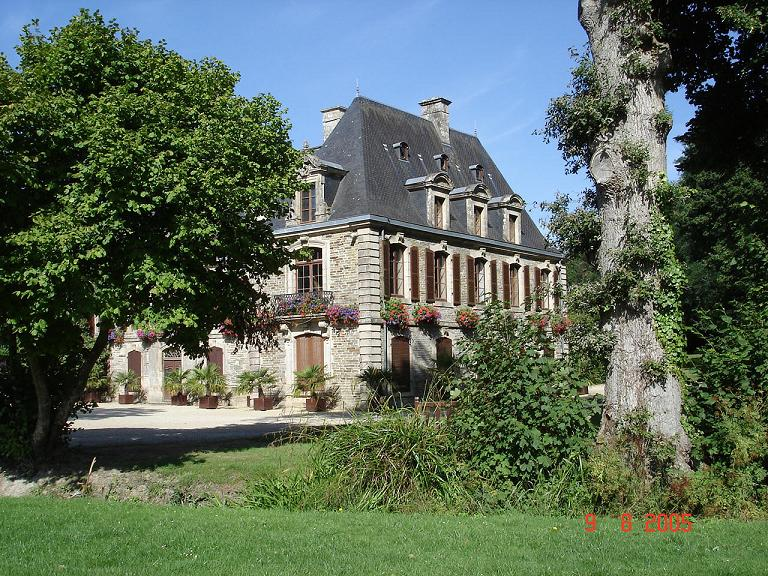
- The Manor of Tronjoly

- Coat of arms
- Location of Gourin
- Location within France Location within Brittany
- Coordinates: 48°08′28″N 3°36′21″W
- Country: France
- Region: Brittany
- Department: Morbihan
- Arrondissement: Pontivy
- Canton: Gourin
- Intercommunality: Roi Morvan Communauté

Government
  - Mayor (2026–32): Bérangère Fritz
- Area^{1}: 74.72 km^{2} (28.85 sq mi)
- Highest elevation: 301 m (988 ft)
- Lowest elevation: 83 m (272 ft)
- Population (2023): 3,960
  - Density: 53.0/km^{2} (137/sq mi)
- Time zone: UTC+01:00 (CET)
  - Summer (DST): UTC+02:00 (CEST)
- INSEE/Postal code: 56066 /56110
- ^{1} French Land Register data, which excludes lakes, ponds, glaciers > 1 km^{2} (0.386 sq mi or 247 acres) and river estuaries.

Gourin (French pronunciation: [ɡuʁɛ̃]; Breton: Gourin) is a commune in the Morbihan département of Brittany in north-western France.

== Geography ==
Gourin is in the northwest of Morbihan, 40 km (25 mi) northeast of Quimper and 47 km (29 mi) northwest of Lorient. Historically, it belongs to Cornouaille. Gourin is on the southern slope of the Montagnes Noires (French, Black Mountains). The river Inam rises in the northern part of Gourin and flows to the south.

== Map ==
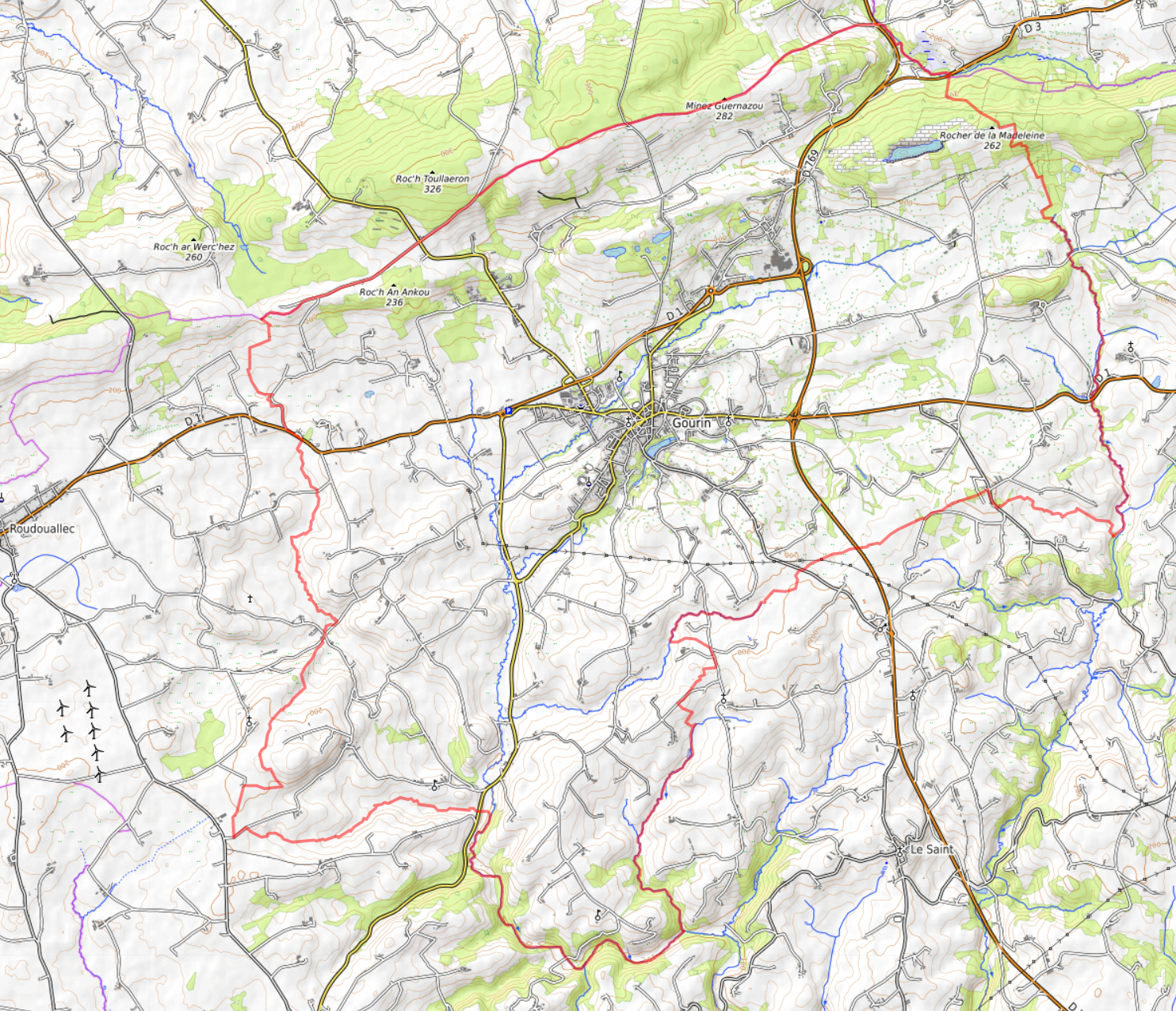
Topographic map

== Demographics ==
Inhabitants of Gourin are called in French Gourinois. Gourin lost 40% of its population since 1946.

Historical population

Year	Pop.	±% p.a.
1793	3,496	—
1800	3,579	+0.34%
1806	3,002	−2.89%
1821	3,261	+0.55%
1831	3,626	+1.07%
1836	3,394	−1.31%
1841	3,783	+2.19%
1846	4,062	+1.43%
1851	4,310	+1.19%
1856	4,192	−0.55%
1861	4,021	−0.83%
1866	4,184	+0.80%
1872	4,181	−0.01%
1876	4,419	+1.39%
1881	4,448	+0.13%
1886	4,555	+0.48%
1891	4,529	−0.11%
1896	4,723	+0.84%
1901	4,919	+0.82%

Year	Pop.	±% p.a.
1906	5,053	+0.54%
1911	5,409	+1.37%
1921	5,766	+0.64%
1926	5,522	−0.86%
1931	5,909	+1.36%
1936	5,737	−0.59%
1946	6,391	+1.09%
1954	5,576	−1.69%
1962	5,195	−0.88%
1968	5,128	−0.22%
1975	5,199	+0.20%
1982	4,925	−0.77%
1990	4,734	−0.49%
1999	4,464	−0.65%
2007	4,131	−0.96%
2012	4,068	−0.31%
2017	3,803	−1.34%
2023	3,960	+0.68%

Source: EHESS and INSEE (1968–2023)

== History ==
This small town is well known for the Révolte des Bonnets Rouges against local nobles at the end of the 17th century. The town is also known for being the origin of many immigrants to United States and Canada during the first part of the 20th century. It has a large copy of the Statue of Liberty standing in the main square opposite the town hall alongside the monument to the fallen soldiers of the 20th century who came from this region.

Gourin still has a large number of native Breton speakers. The people of this region are very proud of their Celtic heritage and have preserved many old customs and traditions.

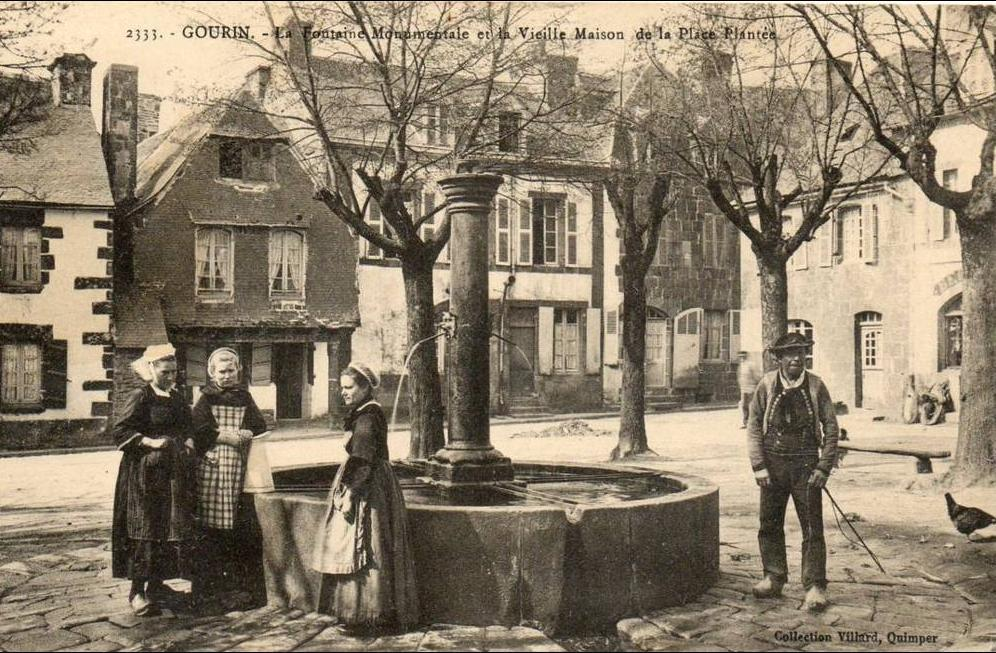
Place Stenfort in Gourin at the beginning of the twentieth century.

== Breton language ==
In 2008, 18.32% of primary school children attended bilingual schools.

== People ==
- Georges Cochevelou, father of the Breton musician, Alan Stivell, was from Gourin

== Twinning ==
Gourin is twinned with the following place:

- (Republic of Ireland) Rush, Leinster, Ireland

== Gallery ==
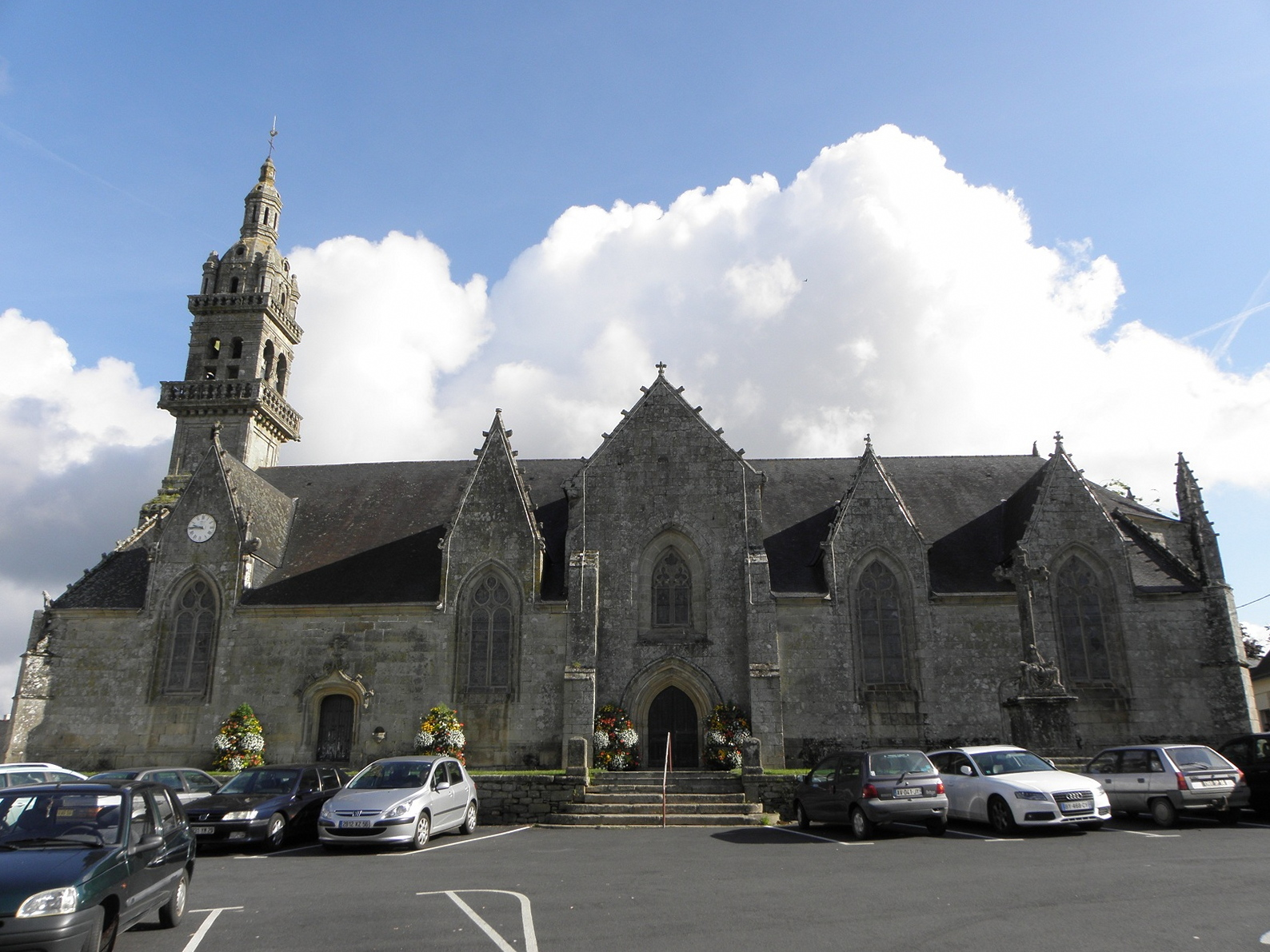
The parish church

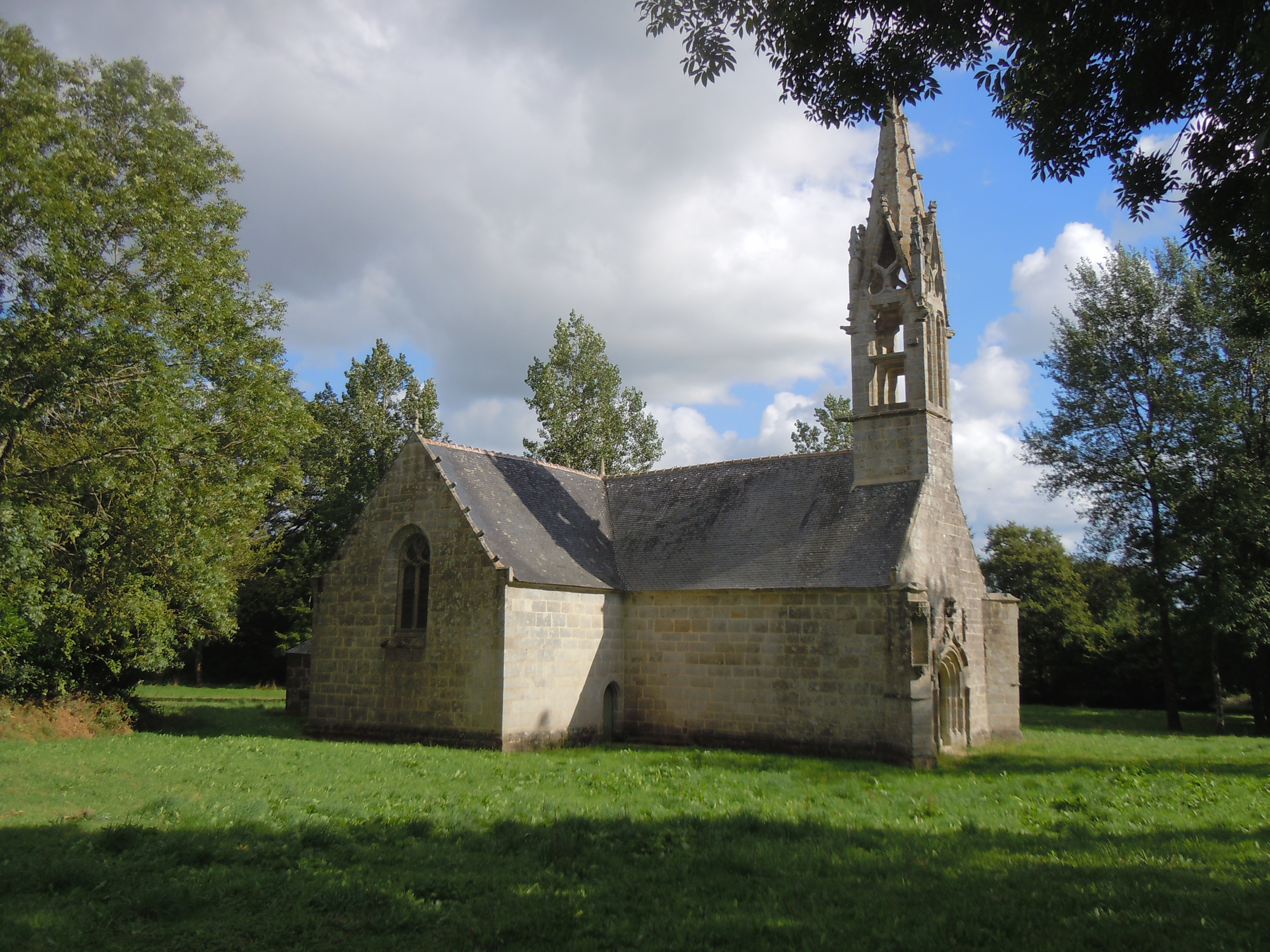
Saint Hervé chapel

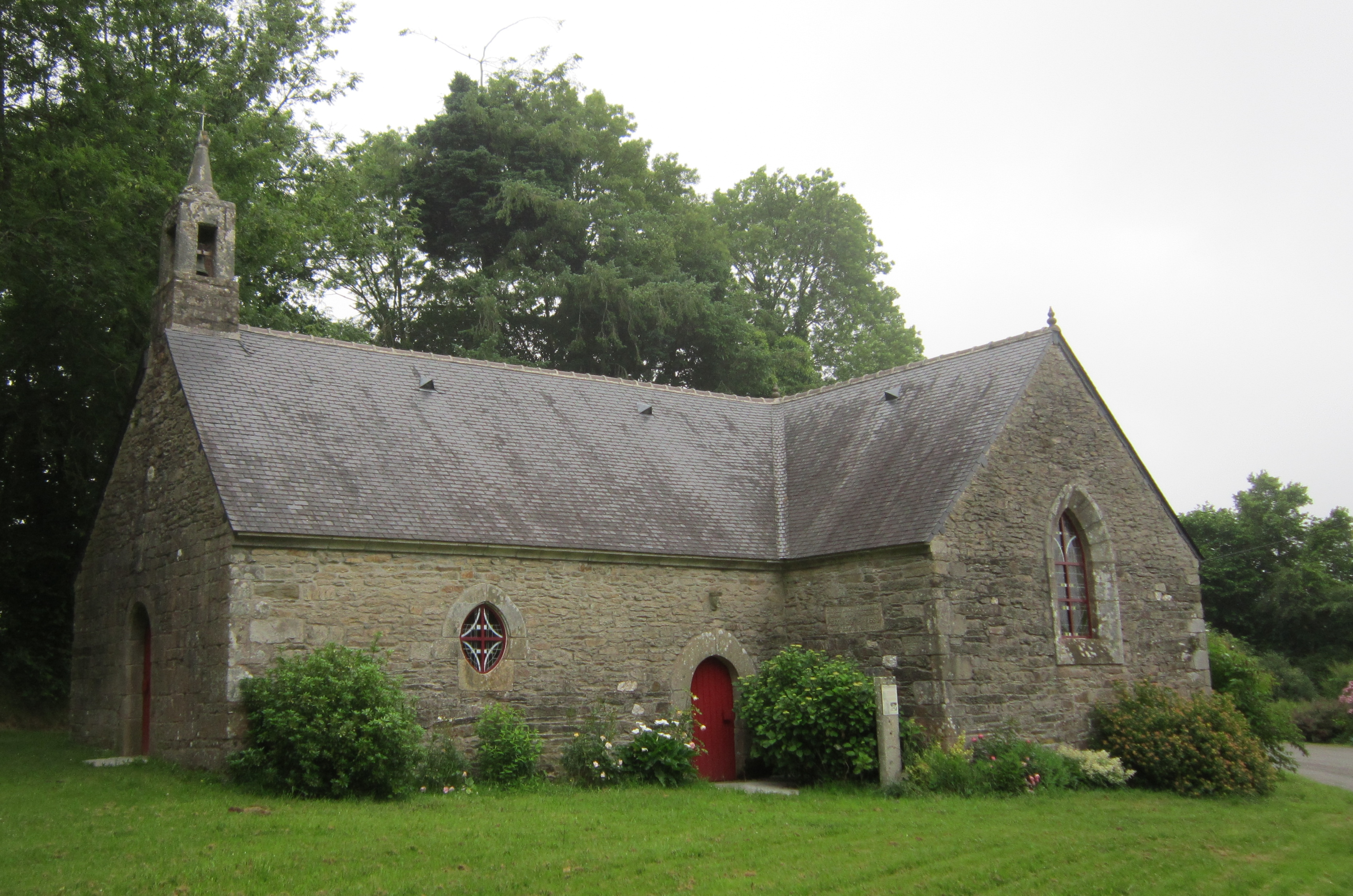
Sainte-Julienne chapel

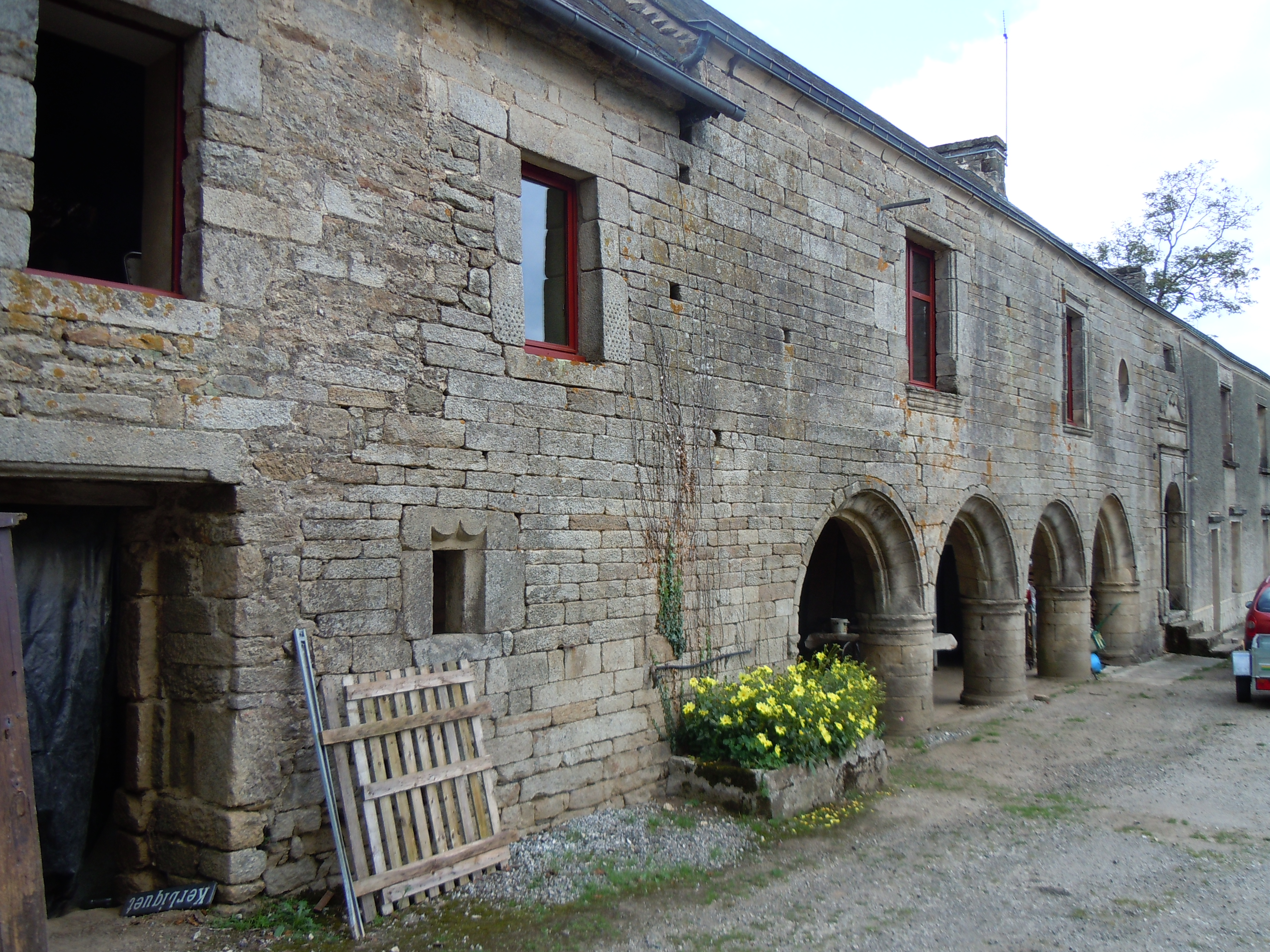
Manor of Kerbiquet

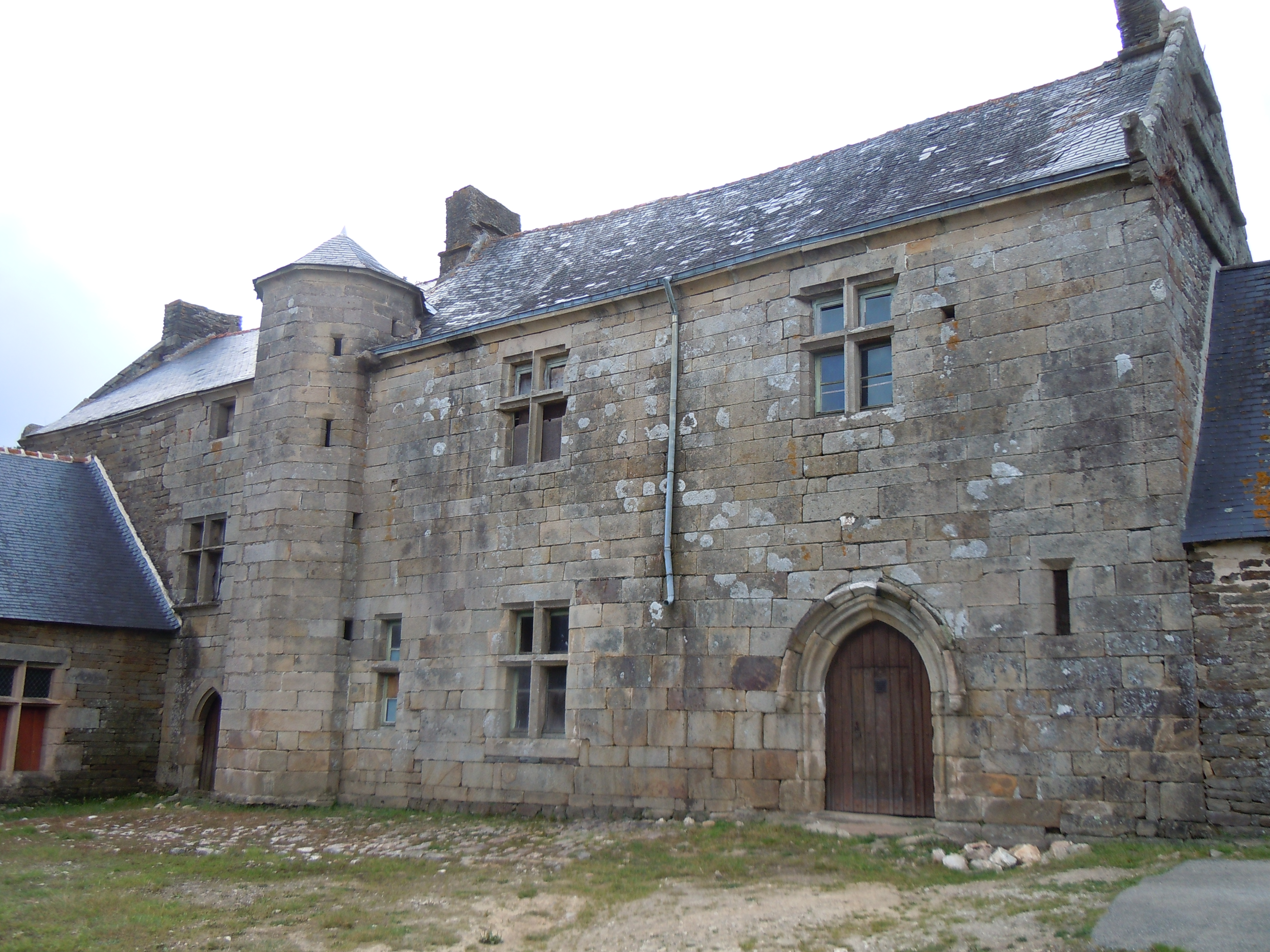
Manor of Menguionnet

== See also ==
- Communes of the Morbihan department
- Listing of the works of the atelier of the Maître de Tronoën
- List of the works of the Maître de Lanrivain
