= Saint-Gonnery =

Saint-Gonnery Sant-Goneri
- Commune
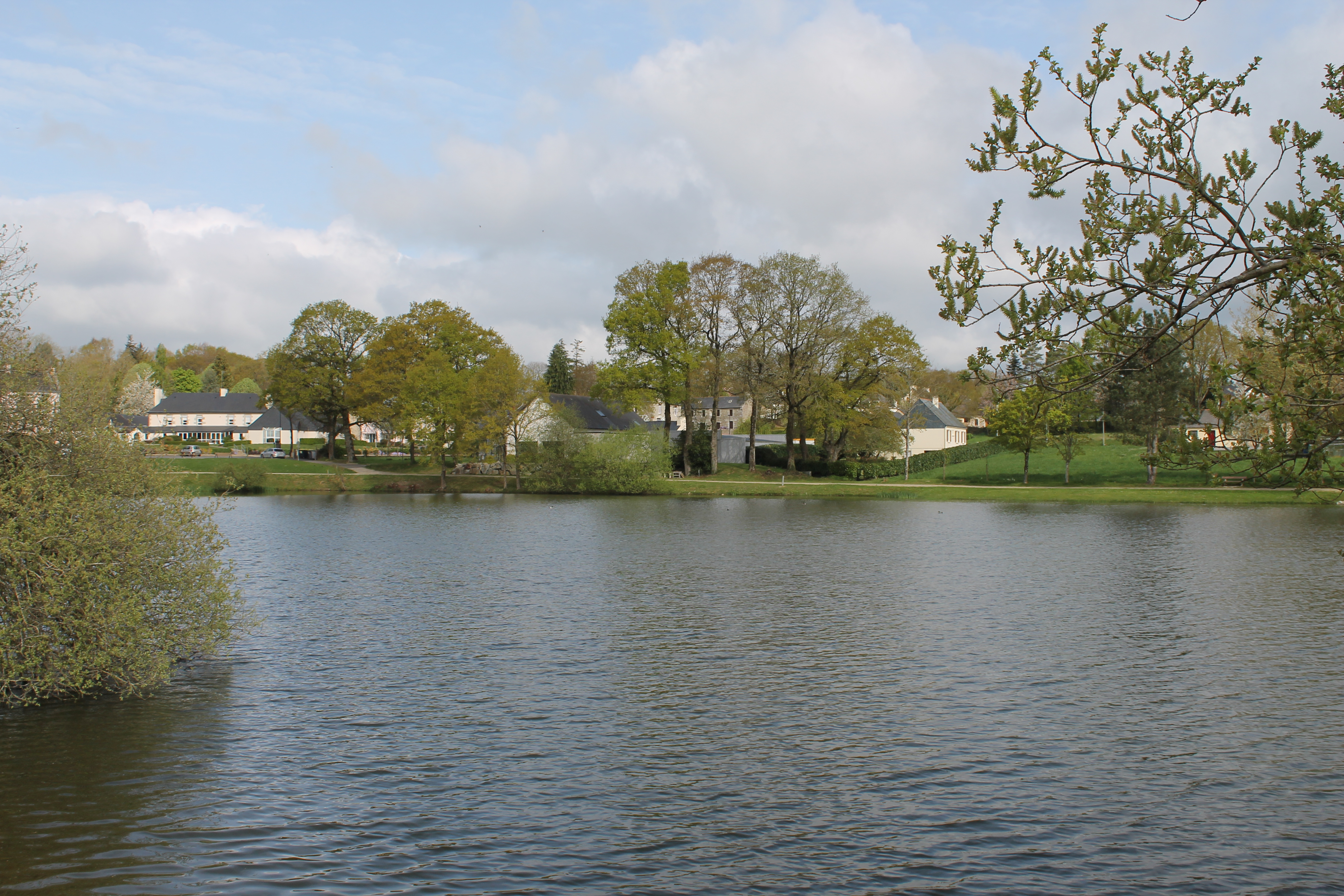
- The pond and the village.
- Location of Saint-Gonnery
- Location within France Location within Brittany
- Coordinates: 48°07′28″N 2°49′07″W
- Country: France
- Region: Brittany
- Department: Morbihan
- Arrondissement: Pontivy
- Canton: Pontivy
- Intercommunality: Pontivy Communauté

Government
  - Mayor (2026–32): Claude Viet
- Area^{1}: 16.29 km^{2} (6.29 sq mi)
- Highest elevation: 166 m (545 ft)
- Lowest elevation: 70 m (230 ft)
- Population (2023): 1,087
  - Density: 66.73/km^{2} (172.8/sq mi)
- Time zone: UTC+01:00 (CET)
  - Summer (DST): UTC+02:00 (CEST)
- INSEE/Postal code: 56215 /56920
- ^{1} French Land Register data, which excludes lakes, ponds, glaciers > 1 km^{2} (0.386 sq mi or 247 acres) and river estuaries.

Saint-Gonnery (French pronunciation: [sɛ̃ ɡɔnʁi]; Breton: Sant-Goneri) is a commune in the Morbihan department of Brittany in north-western France. Inhabitants of Saint-Gonnery are called in French Gonneriens.

== See also ==
- Communes of the Morbihan department
- Goneri of Brittany, hermit saint
