= Gueltas =

Commune in Brittany, France

Gueltas Gweltaz
- Commune
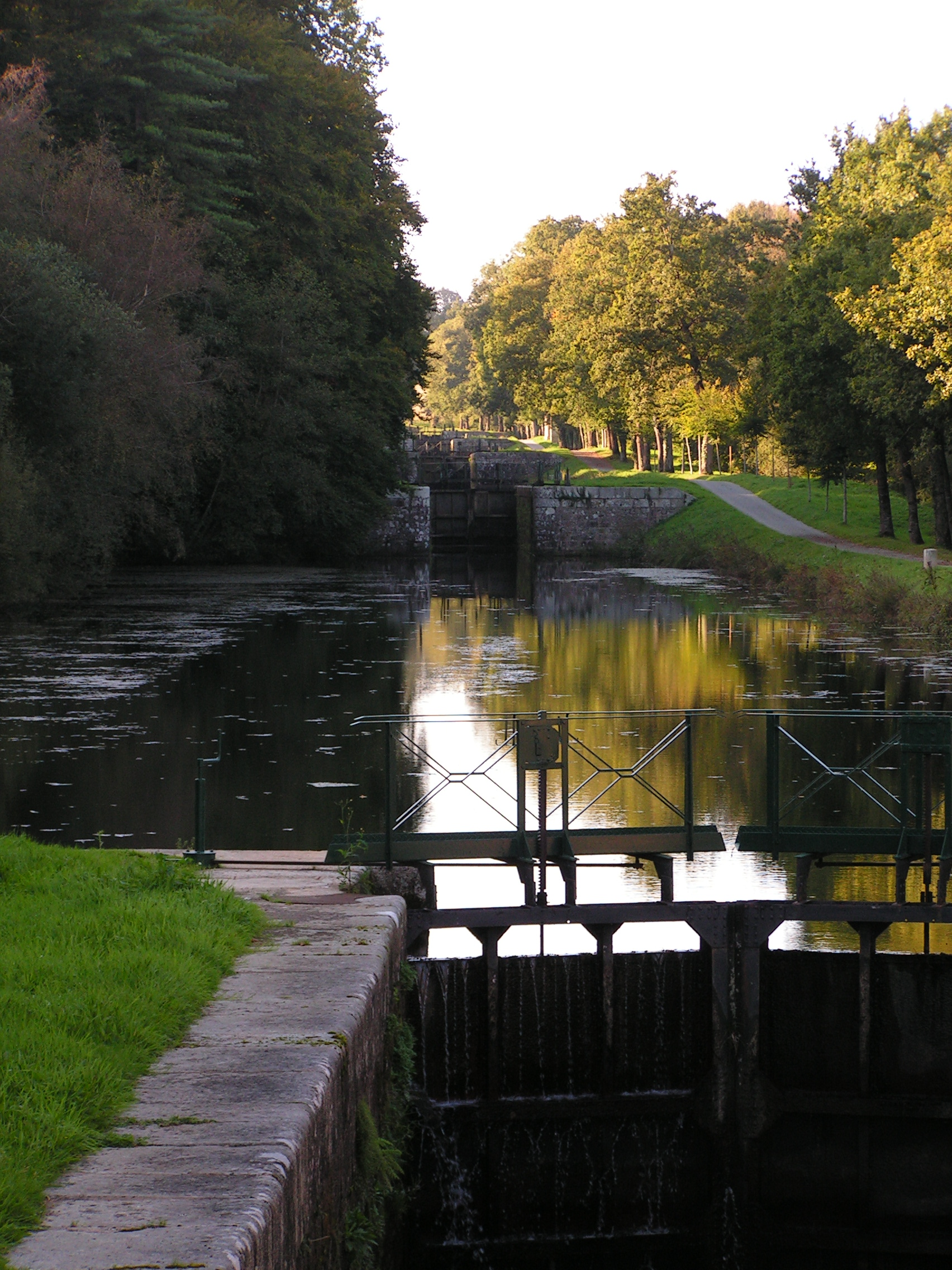
- The Boju locks, at Gueltas
- Location of Gueltas
- Location within France Location within Brittany
- Coordinates: 48°05′42″N 2°47′41″W
- Country: France
- Region: Brittany
- Department: Morbihan
- Arrondissement: Pontivy
- Canton: Pontivy
- Intercommunality: Pontivy Communauté

Government
  - Mayor (2026–32): Jean-Yves Quentel
- Area^{1}: 20.45 km^{2} (7.90 sq mi)
- Highest elevation: 162 m (531 ft)
- Lowest elevation: 66 m (217 ft)
- Population (2023): 551
  - Density: 26.9/km^{2} (69.8/sq mi)
- Time zone: UTC+01:00 (CET)
  - Summer (DST): UTC+02:00 (CEST)
- INSEE/Postal code: 56072 /56920
- ^{1} French Land Register data, which excludes lakes, ponds, glaciers > 1 km^{2} (0.386 sq mi or 247 acres) and river estuaries.

Gueltas (French pronunciation: [ɡɛltas]; Breton: Gweltaz) is a commune in the Morbihan department in Brittany in north-western France.

Gueltas is twinned with Altarnun, Cornwall. Inhabitants of Gueltas are called in French Gueltasiens.

== See also ==
- Communes of the Morbihan department
