= Saint-Barthélemy, Morbihan =

Saint-Barthélemy Bartelame
- Commune
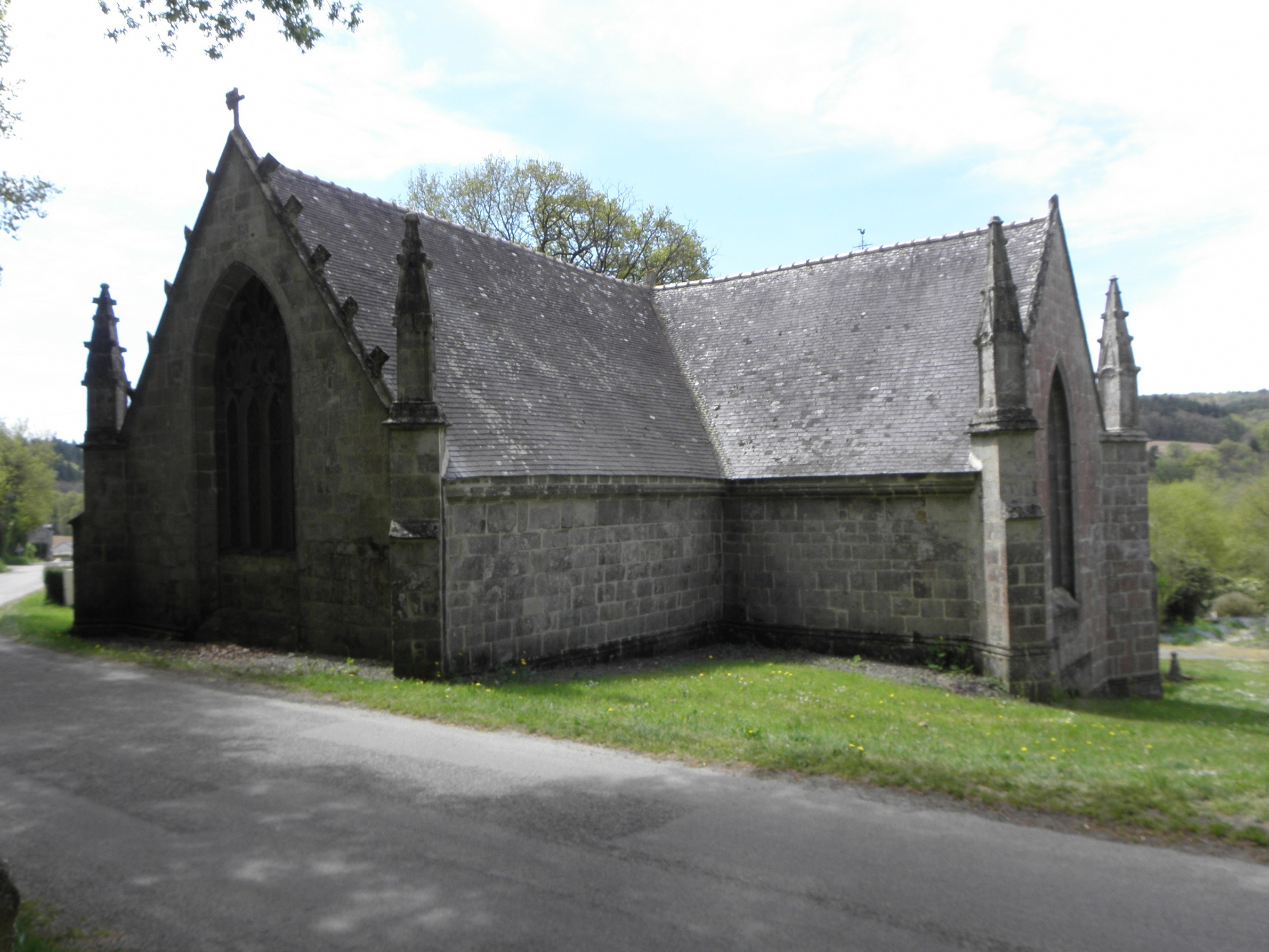
- The Chapel of Saint-Adrien, in Saint-Barthélémy
- Location of Saint-Barthélemy
- Location within France Location within Brittany
- Coordinates: 47°55′36″N 3°02′38″W
- Country: France
- Region: Brittany
- Department: Morbihan
- Arrondissement: Pontivy
- Canton: Pontivy
- Intercommunality: Baud Communauté

Government
  - Mayor (2026–32): Yolande Kervarrec
- Area^{1}: 21.90 km^{2} (8.46 sq mi)
- Highest elevation: 151 m (495 ft)
- Lowest elevation: 27 m (89 ft)
- Population (2023): 1,197
  - Density: 54.66/km^{2} (141.6/sq mi)
- Time zone: UTC+01:00 (CET)
  - Summer (DST): UTC+02:00 (CEST)
- INSEE/Postal code: 56207 /56150
- ^{1} French Land Register data, which excludes lakes, ponds, glaciers > 1 km^{2} (0.386 sq mi or 247 acres) and river estuaries.

Saint-Barthélemy (French pronunciation: [sɛ̃ baʁtelemi]; Breton: Bartelame) is a commune in the Morbihan department of Brittany in north-western France. Inhabitants of Saint-Barthélemy are called in French Bartholoméens.

== See also ==
- Communes of the Morbihan department
