= Pluméliau-Bieuzy =

- Commune
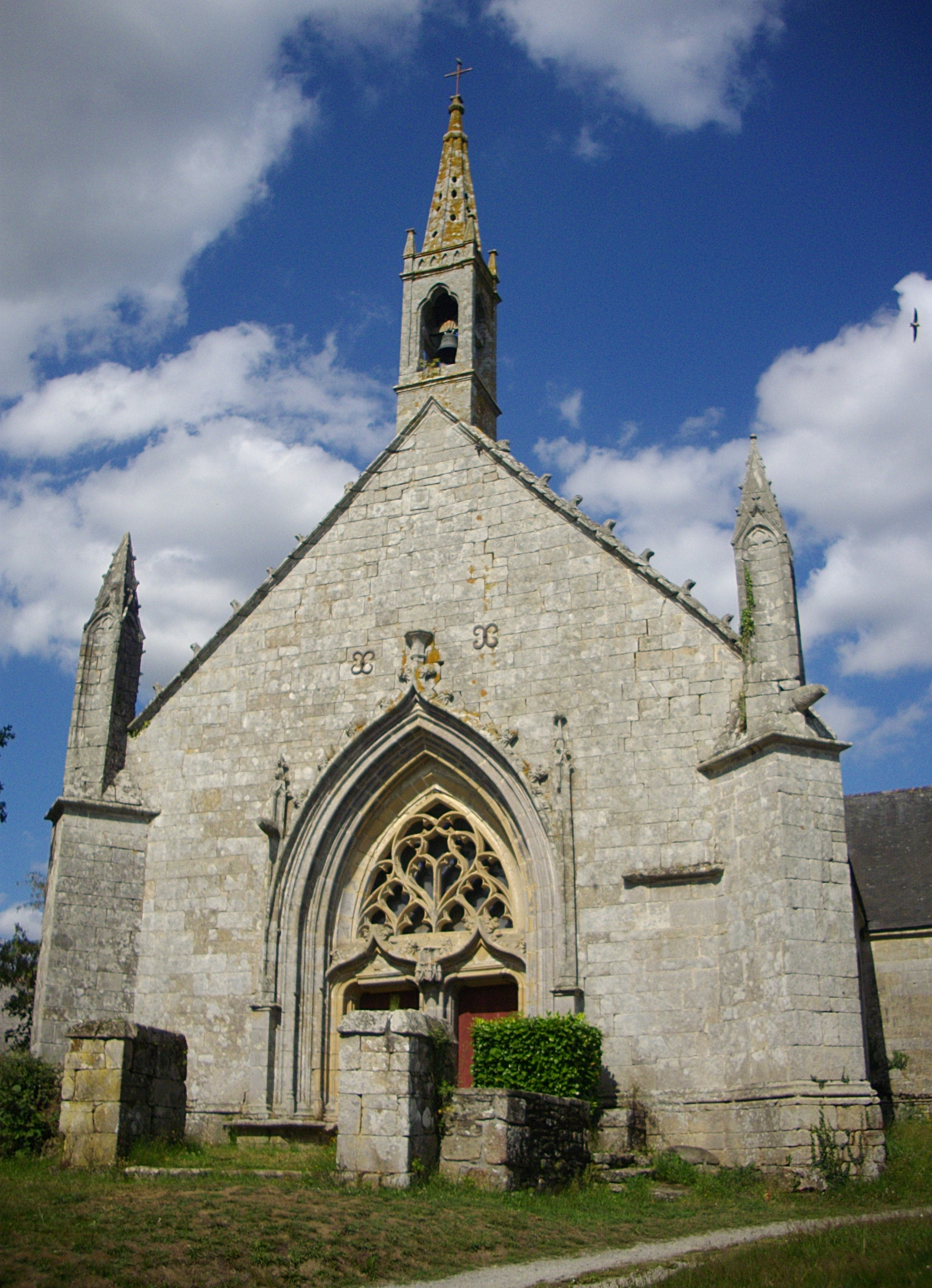
- The Chapel of Saint-Nicolas-des-Eaux, in Pluméliau
- Location of Pluméliau-Bieuzy
- Location within France Location within Brittany
- Coordinates: 47°57′30″N 2°58′20″W
- Country: France
- Region: Brittany
- Department: Morbihan
- Arrondissement: Pontivy
- Canton: Pontivy
- Intercommunality: Baud Communauté

Government
  - Mayor (2026–32): Claude Annic
- Area^{1}: 86.70 km^{2} (33.48 sq mi)
- Highest elevation: 176 m (577 ft)
- Lowest elevation: 33 m (108 ft)
- Population (2023): 4,632
  - Density: 53.43/km^{2} (138.4/sq mi)
- Time zone: UTC+01:00 (CET)
  - Summer (DST): UTC+02:00 (CEST)
- INSEE/Postal code: 56173 /56930
- ^{1} French Land Register data, which excludes lakes, ponds, glaciers > 1 km^{2} (0.386 sq mi or 247 acres) and river estuaries.

Pluméliau-Bieuzy (French pronunciation: [plymeljo bjøzi]; Breton: Pluniav-Bizhui) is a commune in the Morbihan department in Brittany, north-western France. It was established on 1 January 2019 by merger of the former communes of Pluméliau (the seat) and Bieuzy.

== Population ==
Population data refer to the area corresponding with the commune as of January 2025.

Historical population
Year	Pop.	±% p.a.
1968	4,676	—
1975	4,410	−0.83%
1982	4,058	−1.18%
1990	3,964	−0.29%
1999	3,799	−0.47%
2007	4,198	+1.26%
2012	4,354	+0.73%
2017	4,379	+0.11%
2023	4,632	+0.94%
Source: INSEE

== See also ==
- Communes of the Morbihan department
