= Véronique Boudon-Millot =

French philologist and historian of medicine

- Awards: Bordin Prize (2001)

Academic work
- Discipline: history
- Sub-discipline: history of medicine
- Institutions: French National Centre for Scientific Research
- Main interests: ancient medicine
- Notable works: Galen de Pergamon: A Greek Physician in Rome

Véronique Boudon-Millot or Véronique Boudon is a French philologist and historian of medicine.

== Biography ==
As a research director at CNRS and a Hellenist, she specializes in the ancient medical corpus, publishing several works with Les Belles Lettres. In her research, she explores the differences between ancient Greek concepts and modern Western perceptions of medicine. The researcher is also interested in the figure of Hippocrates but is particularly renowned for her works on Galen, some of which, like Galen de Pergamon: A Greek Physician in Rome are considered "monumental" in the study of the Greek physician.

In 2001, she was awarded the Bordin Prize by the Institut de France for establishing and translating the text of Galen's Exhortation to the Study of Medicine. She leads the laboratory on Greek medicine within the UMR Orient Méditerranée. In 2005, along with Jacques Jouanna and one of her students, Antoine Pietrobelli, who was then working on his thesis and had just discovered an unpublished manuscript of Galen in an Orthodox monastery in Thessaloniki, she went there to establish the text and collaborated with him to publish the texts.

Véronique Boudon-Millot is also involved in the management and rediscovery of certain documents in the Ajaccio library related to her field of study.

== Awards ==
- Bordin Prize (2001)
