= Le Sourn =

Le Sourn Ar Sorn
- Commune
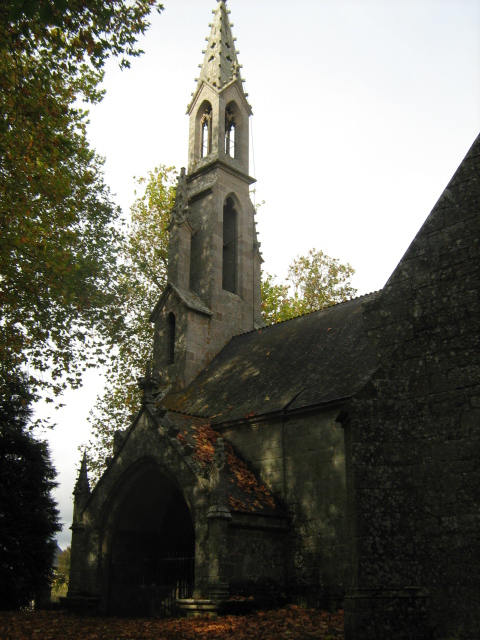
- The chapel of Saint-Michel, in Le Sourn
- Location of Le Sourn
- Location within France Location within Brittany
- Coordinates: 48°02′37″N 2°59′19″W
- Country: France
- Region: Brittany
- Department: Morbihan
- Arrondissement: Pontivy
- Canton: Pontivy
- Intercommunality: Pontivy Communauté

Government
  - Mayor (2026–32): Jean-Jacques Videlo
- Area^{1}: 16.05 km^{2} (6.20 sq mi)
- Highest elevation: 184 m (604 ft)
- Lowest elevation: 46 m (151 ft)
- Population (2023): 2,121
  - Density: 132.1/km^{2} (342.3/sq mi)
- Time zone: UTC+01:00 (CET)
  - Summer (DST): UTC+02:00 (CEST)
- INSEE/Postal code: 56246 /56300
- ^{1} French Land Register data, which excludes lakes, ponds, glaciers > 1 km^{2} (0.386 sq mi or 247 acres) and river estuaries.

Le Sourn (French pronunciation: [lə suʁn]; Breton: Ar Sourn) is a commune in the Morbihan department of Brittany in north-western France.

== Population ==
Historical population
| Year | Pop. | ±% p.a. |
|---|---|---|
| 1968 | 1,008 | — |
| 1975 | 1,246 | +3.07% |
| 1982 | 1,589 | +3.53% |
| 1990 | 1,790 | +1.50% |
| 1999 | 1,843 | +0.32% |
| 2007 | 2,002 | +1.04% |
| 2012 | 2,056 | +0.53% |
| 2017 | 2,107 | +0.49% |
| 2023 | 2,121 | +0.11% |
Source: INSEE

Inhabitants of Le Sourn are called in French Sournais.

== See also ==
- Communes of the Morbihan department
