= Guern =

Commune in Brittany, France

Guern Gwern
- Commune
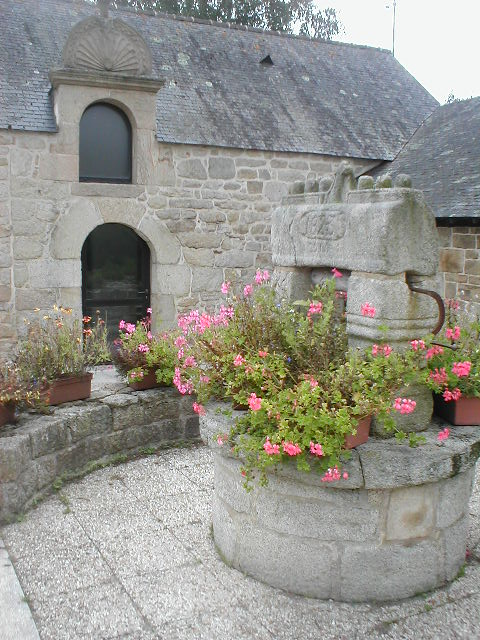
- The town hall in Guern
- Location of Guern
- Location within France Location within Brittany
- Coordinates: 48°01′53″N 3°05′26″W
- Country: France
- Region: Brittany
- Department: Morbihan
- Arrondissement: Pontivy
- Canton: Pontivy
- Intercommunality: Pontivy Communauté

Government
  - Mayor (2026–32): Stéphanie L'Hostis-Le Diagon
- Area^{1}: 47.01 km^{2} (18.15 sq mi)
- Highest elevation: 188 m (617 ft)
- Lowest elevation: 67 m (220 ft)
- Population (2023): 1,411
  - Density: 30.01/km^{2} (77.74/sq mi)
- Time zone: UTC+01:00 (CET)
  - Summer (DST): UTC+02:00 (CEST)
- INSEE/Postal code: 56076 /56310
- ^{1} French Land Register data, which excludes lakes, ponds, glaciers > 1 km^{2} (0.386 sq mi or 247 acres) and river estuaries.

Guern (French pronunciation: [ɡɛʁn]; Breton: Gwern) is a commune in the Morbihan department of Brittany in north-western France.

== Population ==
Inhabitants of Guern are called in French Guernates.

Historical population

Year	Pop.	±% p.a.
1793	2,500	—
1800	2,237	−1.58%
1806	3,058	+5.35%
1821	3,079	+0.05%
1831	3,386	+0.95%
1836	3,468	+0.48%
1841	3,327	−0.83%
1846	3,619	+1.70%
1851	3,564	−0.31%
1856	3,280	−1.65%
1861	3,229	−0.31%
1866	3,341	+0.68%
1872	2,654	−3.76%
1876	2,709	+0.51%
1881	2,734	+0.18%
1886	2,766	+0.23%
1891	2,746	−0.15%
1896	2,677	−0.51%
1901	2,787	+0.81%

Year	Pop.	±% p.a.
1906	2,863	+0.54%
1911	2,714	−1.06%
1921	2,524	−0.72%
1926	2,575	+0.40%
1931	2,655	+0.61%
1936	2,466	−1.47%
1946	2,440	−0.11%
1954	2,144	−1.60%
1962	1,896	−1.52%
1968	1,670	−2.09%
1975	1,555	−1.01%
1982	1,534	−0.19%
1990	1,409	−1.06%
1999	1,398	−0.09%
2007	1,451	+0.47%
2012	1,368	−1.17%
2017	1,306	−0.92%
2023	1,411	+1.30%

Source: EHESS and INSEE (1968-2023)

== Geography ==
The village centre is located 10 km (6.2 mi) southwest of Pontivy. The Sarre river flows through the village. The main settlements are the village centre, Quelven and Locmeltro. In the village of Quelven is the basilica Notre-Dame de Quelven.

== Map ==
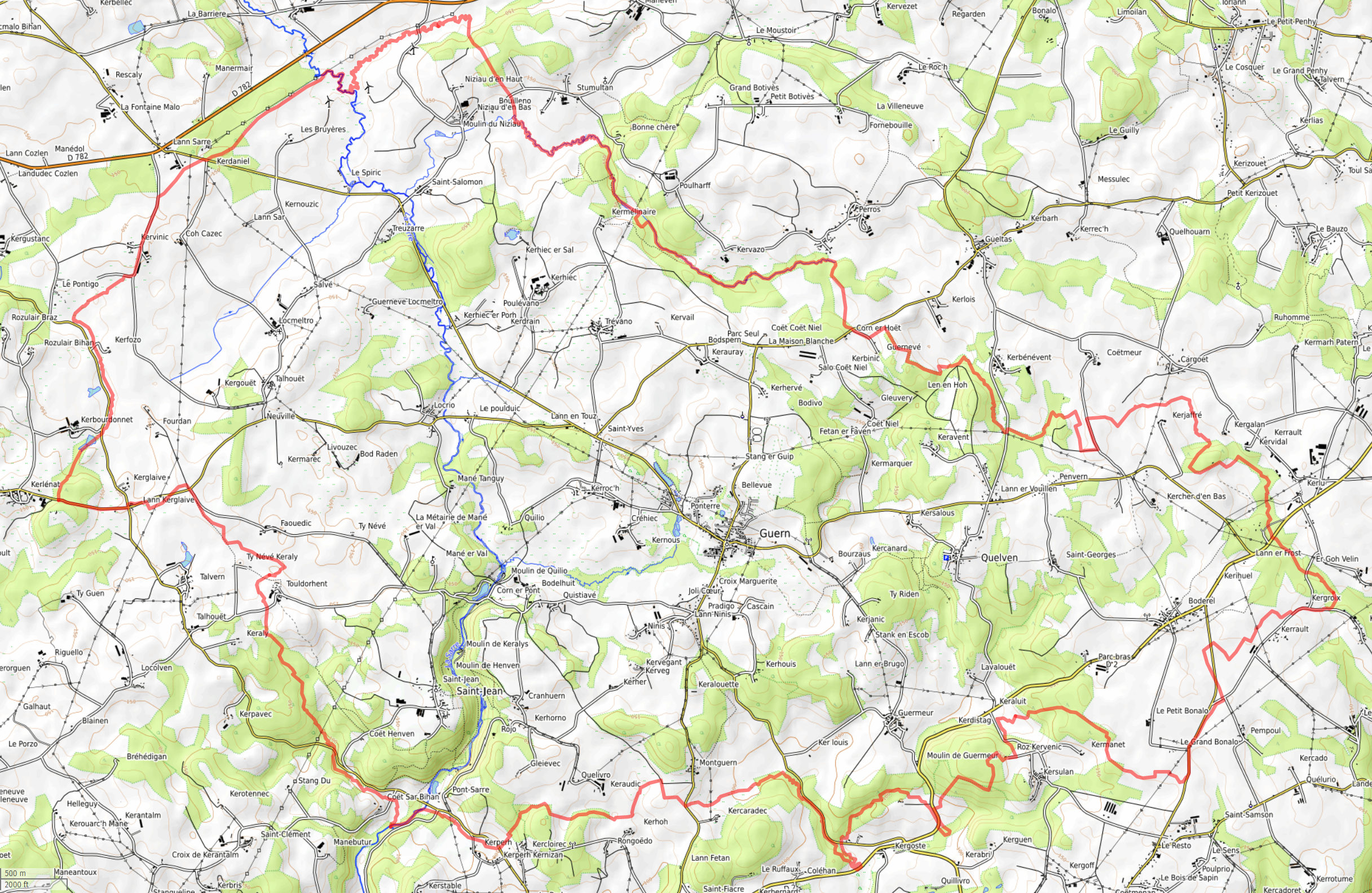
Topographic map

== Gallery ==
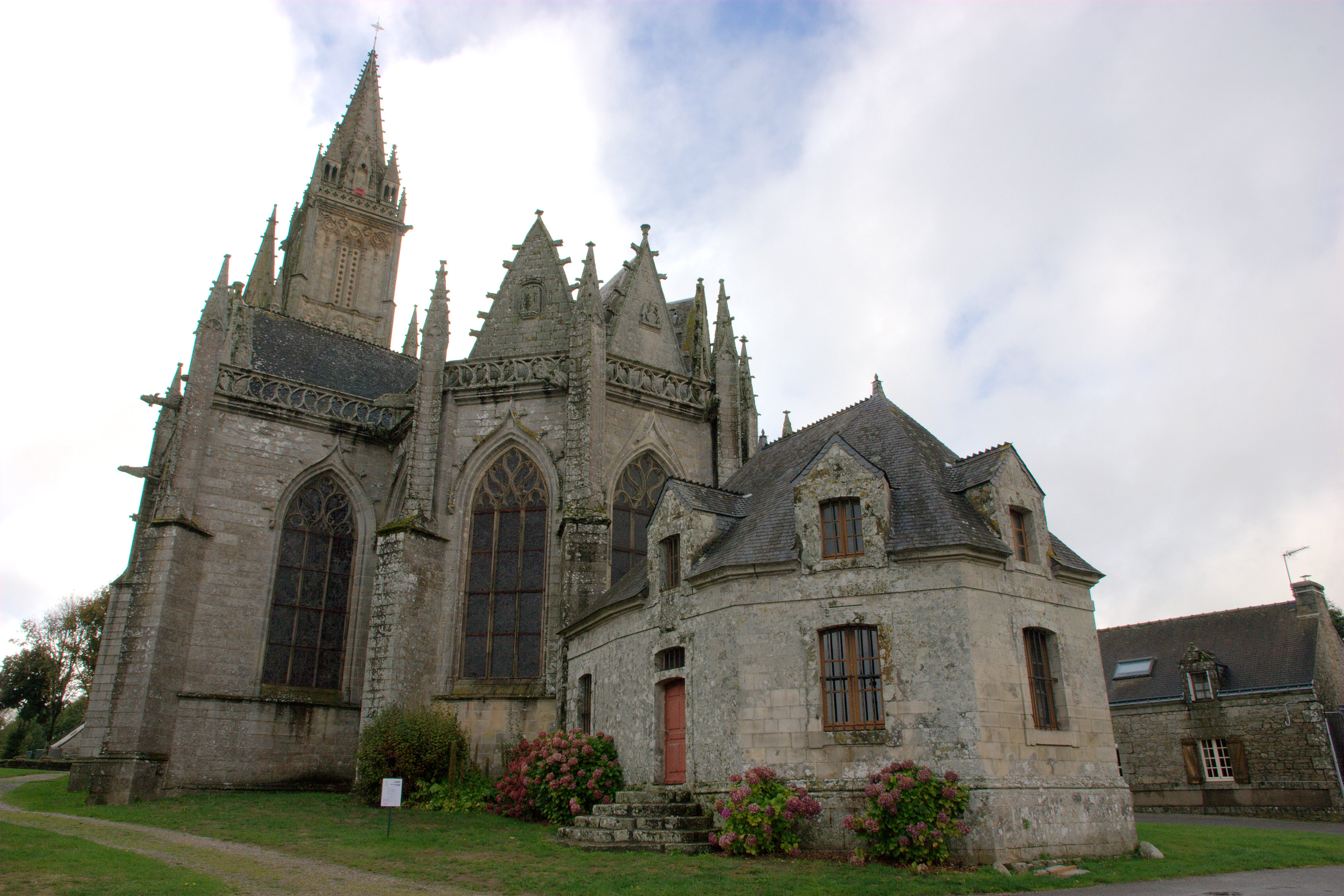
Basilica Notre-Dame de Quelven

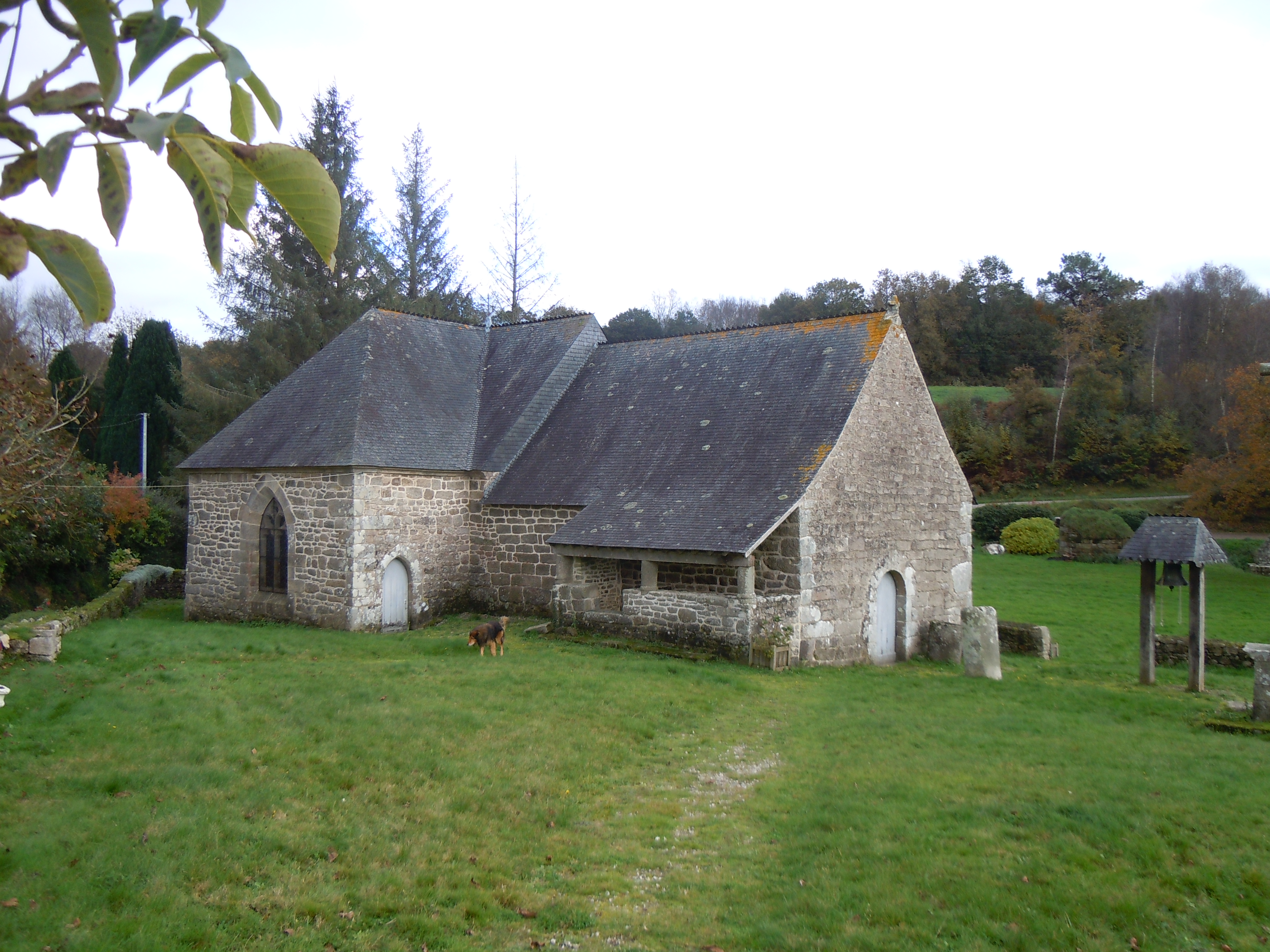
Chapel Saint Meldéoc of Locmeltro

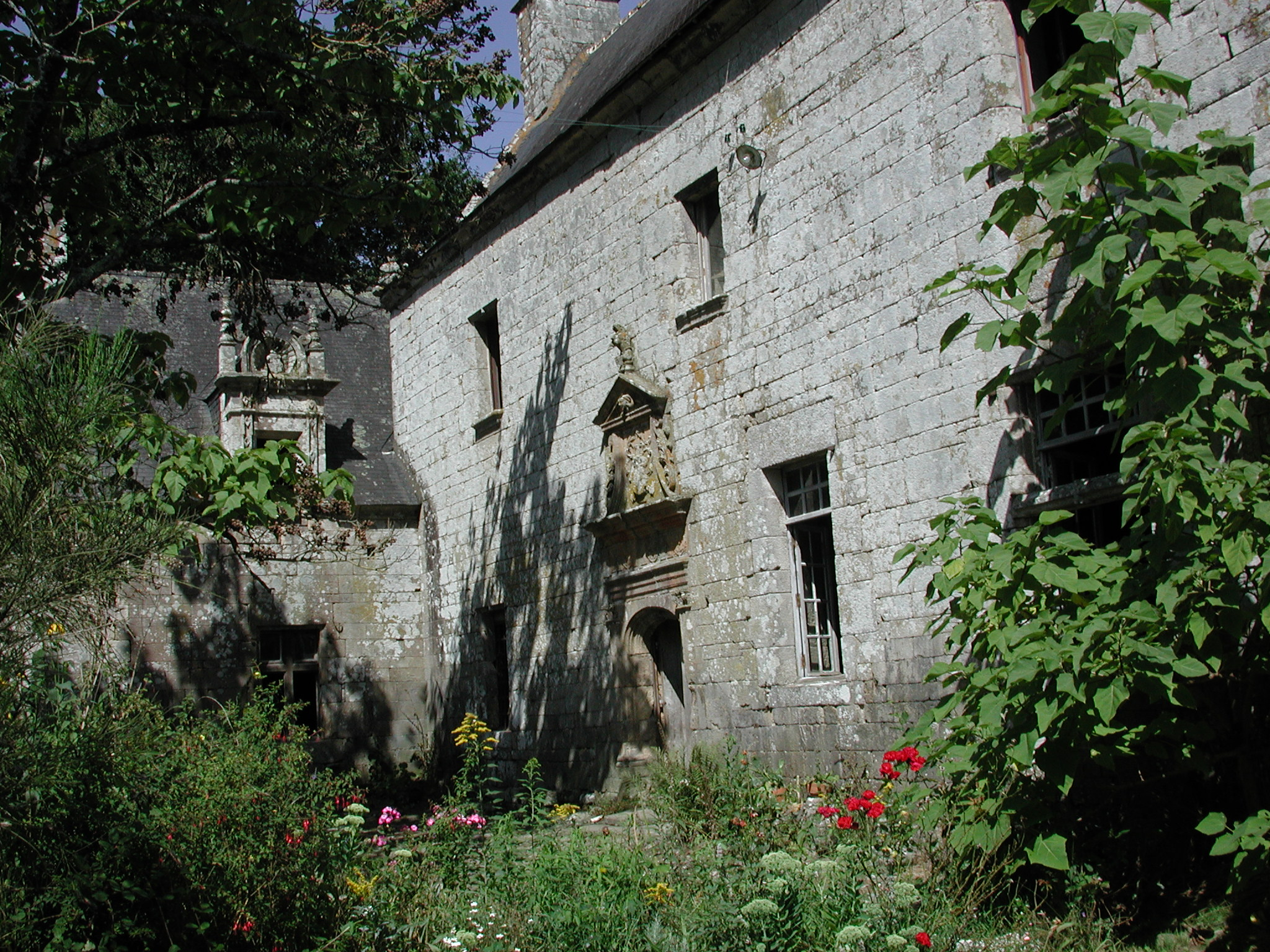
Manor of Menorval

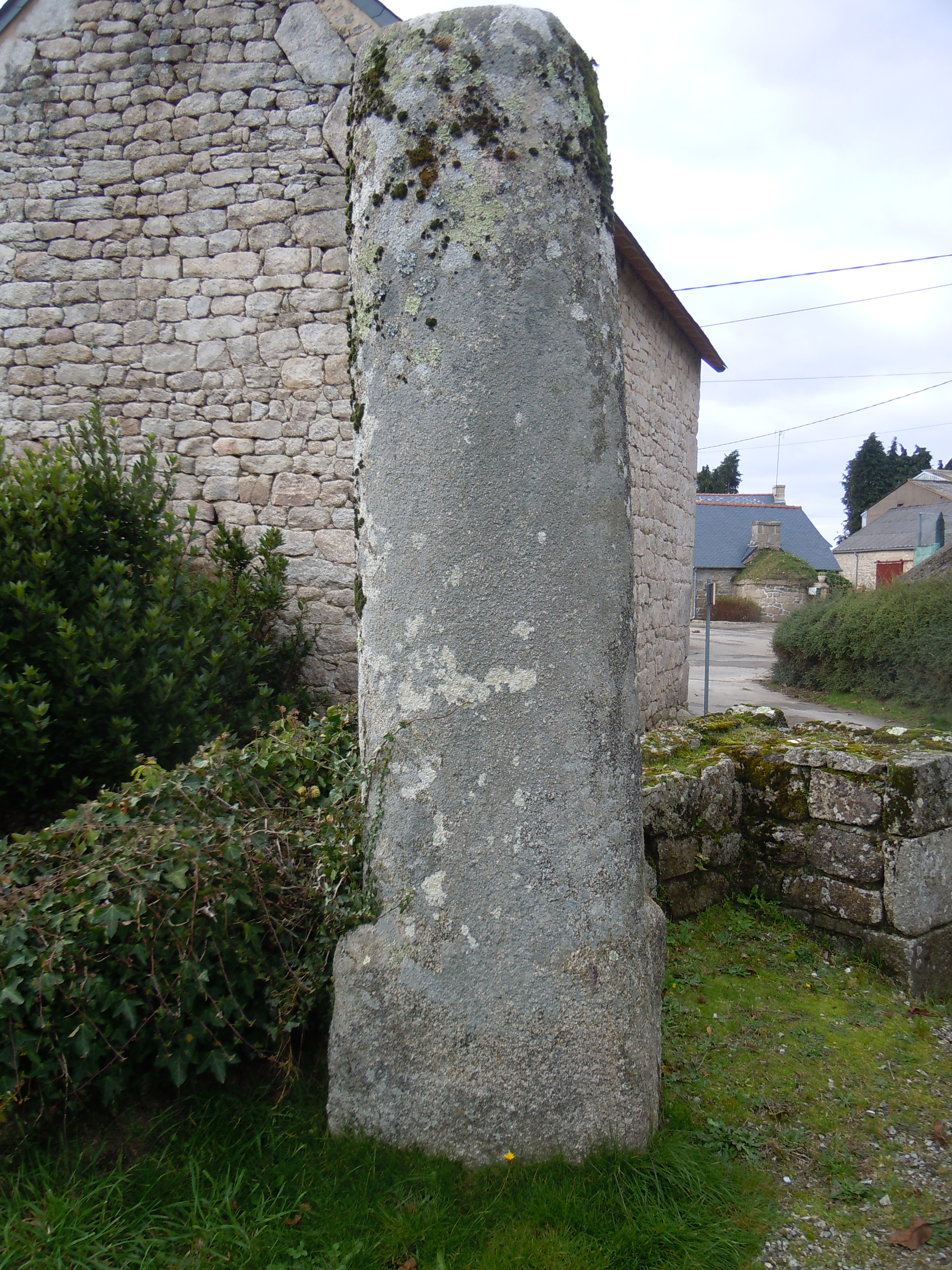
Column of Locmeltro

== See also ==
- Communes of the Morbihan department
