= Canton of Pontivy =

Coordinates: 48.07°N 2.96°W

The canton of Pontivy is an administrative division of the Morbihan department, northwestern France. Its borders were modified at the French canton reorganisation which came into effect in March 2015. Its seat is in Pontivy.

It consists of the following communes:

1. Baud
2. Gueltas
3. Guénin
4. Guern
5. Kerfourn
6. Melrand
7. Noyal-Pontivy
8. Pluméliau-Bieuzy
9. Pontivy
10. Saint-Barthélemy
11. Saint-Gérand-Croixanvec
12. Saint-Gonnery
13. Saint-Thuriau
14. Le Sourn
