= Pontivy =

Pontivy Pondi
- Subprefecture and commune
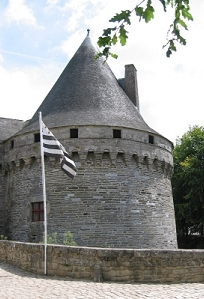
- The Château des Rohan in Pontivy

- Coat of arms
- Location of Pontivy
- Location within France Location within Brittany
- Coordinates: 48°04′09″N 2°57′41″W
- Country: France
- Region: Brittany
- Department: Morbihan
- Arrondissement: Pontivy
- Canton: Pontivy
- Intercommunality: Pontivy Communauté

Government
  - Mayor (2026–32): Soizic Perrault
- Area^{1}: 24.85 km^{2} (9.59 sq mi)
- Elevation: 60 m (200 ft)
- Highest elevation: 192 m (630 ft)
- Lowest elevation: 48 m (157 ft)
- Population (2023): 14,640
  - Density: 589.1/km^{2} (1,526/sq mi)
- Time zone: UTC+01:00 (CET)
  - Summer (DST): UTC+02:00 (CEST)
- INSEE/Postal code: 56178 /56300
- ^{1} French Land Register data, which excludes lakes, ponds, glaciers > 1 km^{2} (0.386 sq mi or 247 acres) and river estuaries.

Pontivy (French pronunciation: [pɔ̃tivi]; Breton: Pondi) is a commune in the Morbihan department in Brittany in north-western France. It lies at the confluence of the river Blavet and the Canal de Nantes à Brest. Inhabitants of Pontivy are called Pontivyens in French.

== Map ==
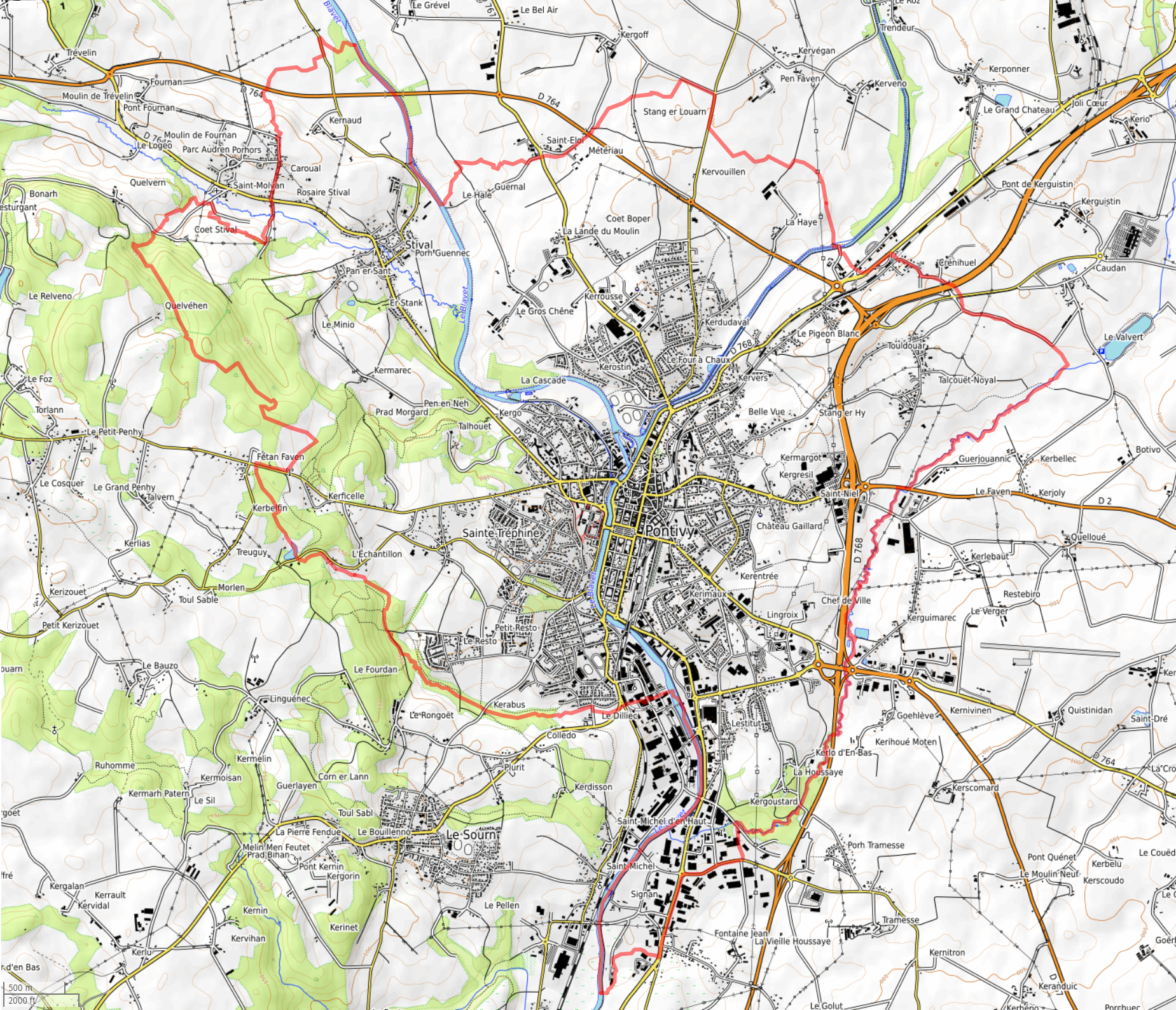
Topographic map

== History ==
A monk called Ivy built a bridge nearby over the river Blavet in the 7th century, and the town is named after him ("pont-Ivi" being the Breton for "Ivy's bridge"). From November 9, 1804, the name was changed to Napoléonville after Napoléon Bonaparte, under whom it had around 3,000 inhabitants. After his downfall, it was renamed Pontivy again, then later Bourbonville, and Napoléonville again after Napoléon III came to power.

== Population ==
Historical population
Year	Pop.	±% p.a.
1968	11,412	—
1975	12,578	+1.40%
1982	12,675	+0.11%
1990	13,140	+0.45%
1999	13,508	+0.31%
2007	13,648	+0.13%
2012	13,973	+0.47%
2017	14,606	+0.89%
2023	14,640	+0.04%
Source: INSEE

== Economy ==
This is a largely agricultural town.

== Breton language ==
The municipality launched a linguistic plan through Ya d'ar brezhoneg on 8 August 2004. As part of that plan, all road signs in the town centre are bilingual.

In 2008, 11.34% of the children in the town attended the bilingual schools in primary education.

== Sights ==
- The castle of Rohan (with its moat) (late XVe).
- The Notre-Dame-de-Joie basilica. [Basilica:
- The Saint Joseph church. [Eglise St. Joseph:

== Events ==
- Every year the final round of Kan ar Bobl, a Breton music competition.

== Twin towns ==
The town maintains twinning links with:

- Tavistock, United Kingdom since 1958
- Ouelessebougou, Mali since 1986
- Wesseling, Germany since 1972
- Napoléonville, United States since 1989

== Climate ==
Climate data for Pontivy (1981–2010 normals, extremes 1968–2016)
Month	Jan	Feb	Mar	Apr	May	Jun	Jul	Aug	Sep	Oct	Nov	Dec	Year
Record high °C (°F)	17.5 (63.5)	19.8 (67.6)	22.9 (73.2)	27.8 (82.0)	30.3 (86.5)	34.6 (94.3)	36.5 (97.7)	39.2 (102.6)	31.4 (88.5)	28.8 (83.8)	20.9 (69.6)	16.5 (61.7)	39.2 (102.6)
Mean daily maximum °C (°F)	8.9 (48.0)	9.5 (49.1)	12.3 (54.1)	14.5 (58.1)	18.0 (64.4)	21.3 (70.3)	23.3 (73.9)	23.4 (74.1)	20.7 (69.3)	16.4 (61.5)	12.1 (53.8)	9.3 (48.7)	15.8 (60.4)
Daily mean °C (°F)	5.9 (42.6)	6.0 (42.8)	8.1 (46.6)	9.7 (49.5)	13.1 (55.6)	16.0 (60.8)	17.9 (64.2)	17.8 (64.0)	15.4 (59.7)	12.2 (54.0)	8.5 (47.3)	6.2 (43.2)	11.4 (52.5)
Mean daily minimum °C (°F)	2.9 (37.2)	2.5 (36.5)	3.9 (39.0)	4.8 (40.6)	8.2 (46.8)	10.6 (51.1)	12.5 (54.5)	12.2 (54.0)	10.1 (50.2)	8.1 (46.6)	5.0 (41.0)	3.1 (37.6)	7.0 (44.6)
Record low °C (°F)	−17.0 (1.4)	−15.1 (4.8)	−7.3 (18.9)	−4.8 (23.4)	−2.2 (28.0)	1.5 (34.7)	5.0 (41.0)	2.0 (35.6)	0.5 (32.9)	−4.6 (23.7)	−6.5 (20.3)	−8.5 (16.7)	−17.0 (1.4)
Average precipitation mm (inches)	117.7 (4.63)	86.9 (3.42)	76.7 (3.02)	73.0 (2.87)	70.8 (2.79)	49.1 (1.93)	47.9 (1.89)	50.2 (1.98)	72.0 (2.83)	105.8 (4.17)	100.2 (3.94)	118.1 (4.65)	968.4 (38.13)
Average precipitation days (≥ 1.0 mm)	14.5	12.0	11.8	11.7	11.1	7.7	7.5	7.1	8.6	13.2	13.4	14.6	133.2
Source: Meteociel

== See also ==
- Communes of the Morbihan department
- Gaston-Auguste Schweitzer Sculptor of Pontivy war memorial
