= Remungol =

Remungol Remengol
- Part of Évellys
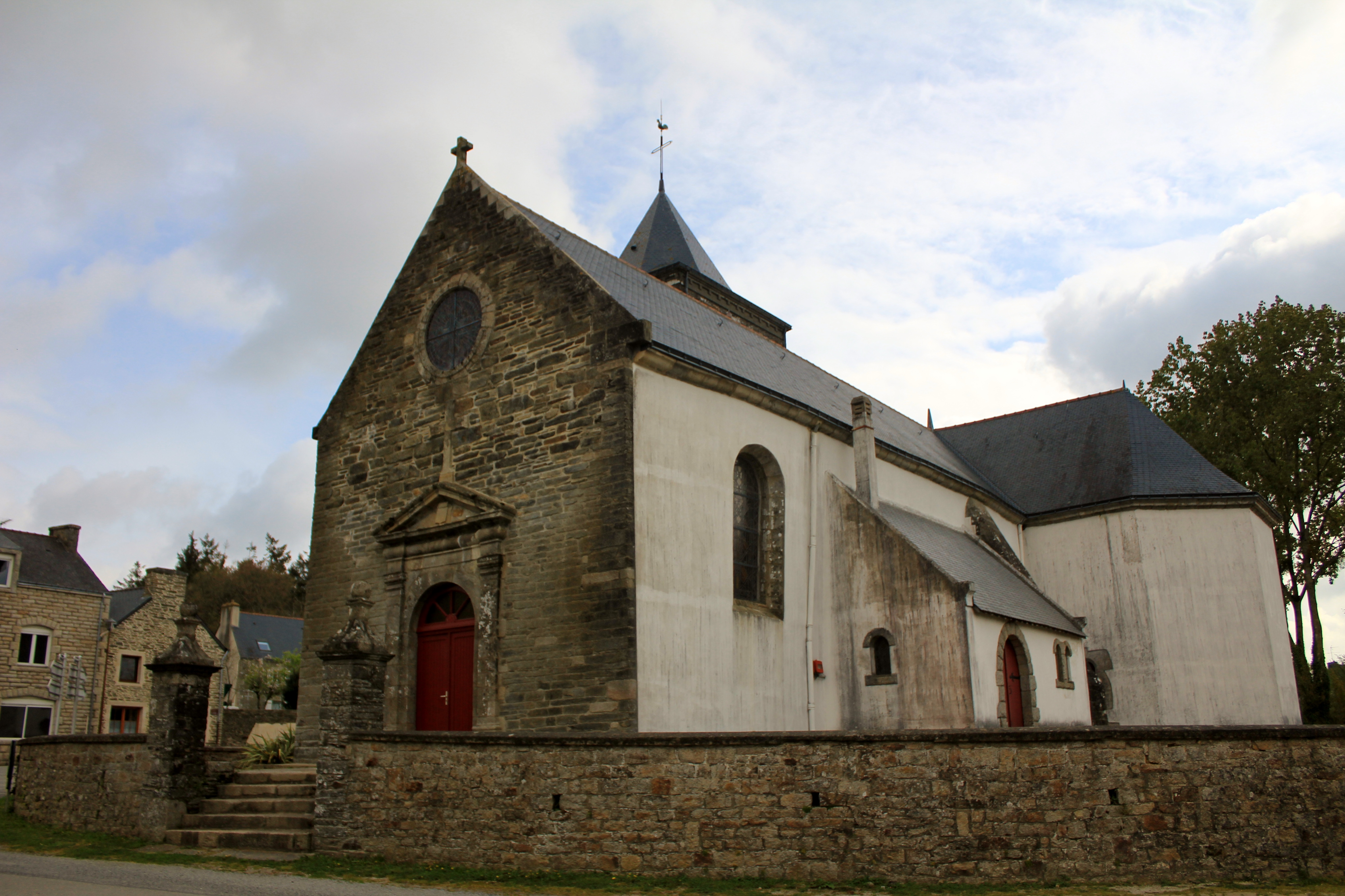
- The church of Sainte-Julitte, in Remungol

- Coat of arms
- Location of Remungol
- Location within France Location within Brittany
- Coordinates: 47°56′05″N 2°53′52″W
- Country: France
- Region: Brittany
- Department: Morbihan
- Arrondissement: Pontivy
- Canton: Grand-Champ
- Commune: Évellys
- Area^{1}: 26.93 km^{2} (10.40 sq mi)
- Highest elevation: 125 m (410 ft)
- Lowest elevation: 42 m (138 ft)
- Population (2022): 936
  - Density: 34.8/km^{2} (90.0/sq mi)
- Time zone: UTC+01:00 (CET)
  - Summer (DST): UTC+02:00 (CEST)
- Postal code: 56500
- ^{1} French Land Register data, which excludes lakes, ponds, glaciers > 1 km^{2} (0.386 sq mi or 247 acres) and river estuaries.

Remungol (French pronunciation: [ʁəmœ̃ɡɔl]; Breton: Remengol) is a former commune in the Morbihan department of Brittany in north-western France. Inhabitants of Remungol are called Remungolais in French.

== History ==
On 1 January 2016, Moustoir-Remungol, Naizin and Remungol merged becoming one commune called Évellys.

== Geography ==
The Ével flows southwestward through the northern part of the commune, then forms its south-western border.

== See also ==
- Communes of the Morbihan department
