= Naizin =

Naizin Neizin
- Part of Évellys
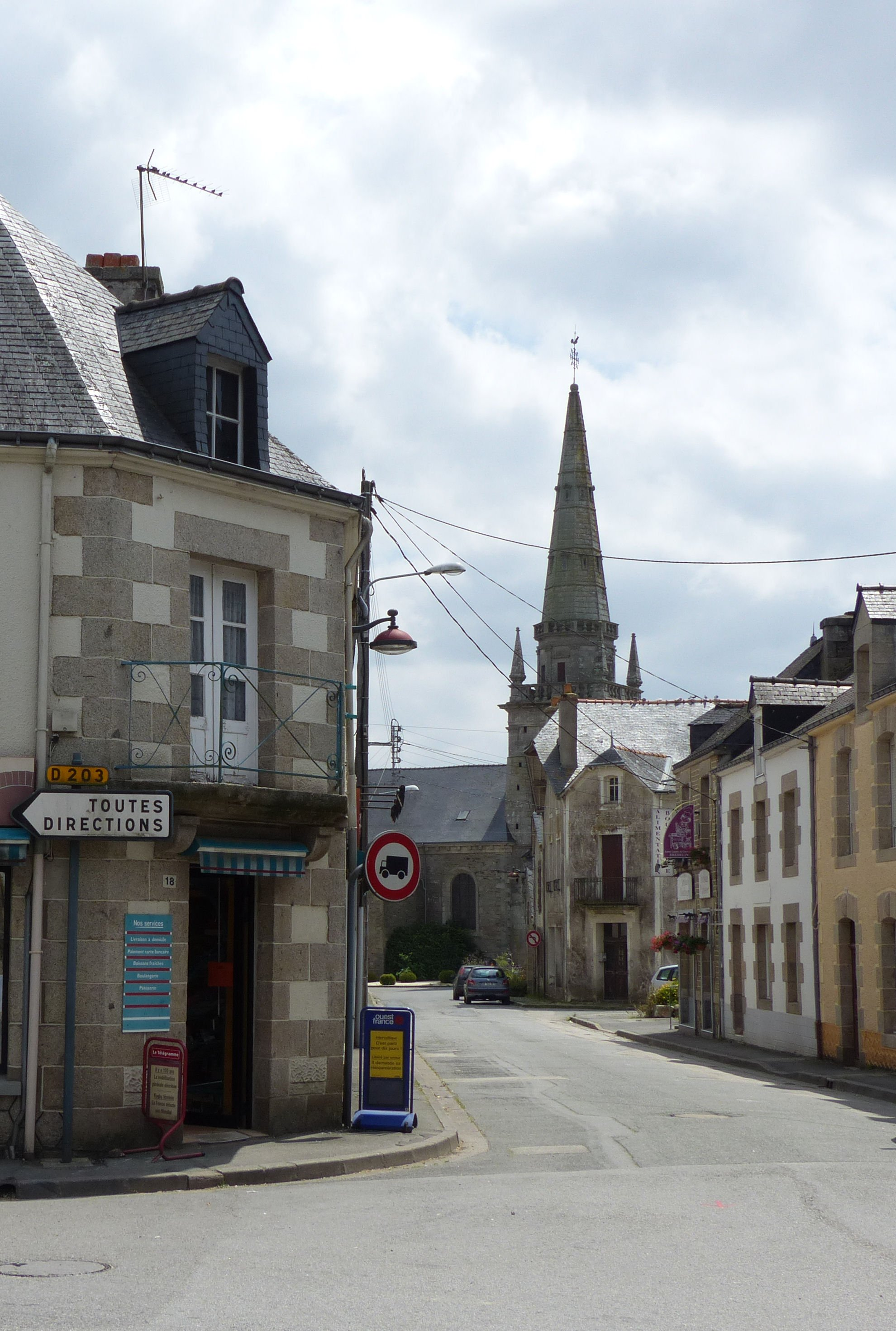
- The main road in Naizin
- Location of Naizin
- Location within France Location within Brittany
- Coordinates: 47°59′24″N 2°49′50″W
- Country: France
- Region: Brittany
- Department: Morbihan
- Arrondissement: Pontivy
- Canton: Grand-Champ
- Commune: Évellys
- Area^{1}: 40.99 km^{2} (15.83 sq mi)
- Highest elevation: 136 m (446 ft)
- Lowest elevation: 57 m (187 ft)
- Population (2022): 1,736
  - Density: 42.35/km^{2} (109.7/sq mi)
- Time zone: UTC+01:00 (CET)
  - Summer (DST): UTC+02:00 (CEST)
- Postal code: 56500
- ^{1} French Land Register data, which excludes lakes, ponds, glaciers > 1 km^{2} (0.386 sq mi or 247 acres) and river estuaries.

Naizin (French pronunciation: [nɛzɛ̃]; Breton: Neizin) is a former commune in the Morbihan department of Brittany in north-western France. It is the seat of the commune of Évellys. Inhabitants of Naizin are called in French Naizinois.

== History ==
On 1 January 2016, Moustoir-Remungol, Naizin and Remungol merged becoming one commune of Évellys.

== Geography ==
The river Ével forms most of the commune's southern border.

== See also ==
- Communes of the Morbihan department
