= Moustoir-Remungol =

Moustoir-Remungol Moustoer-Remengol
- Part of Évellys
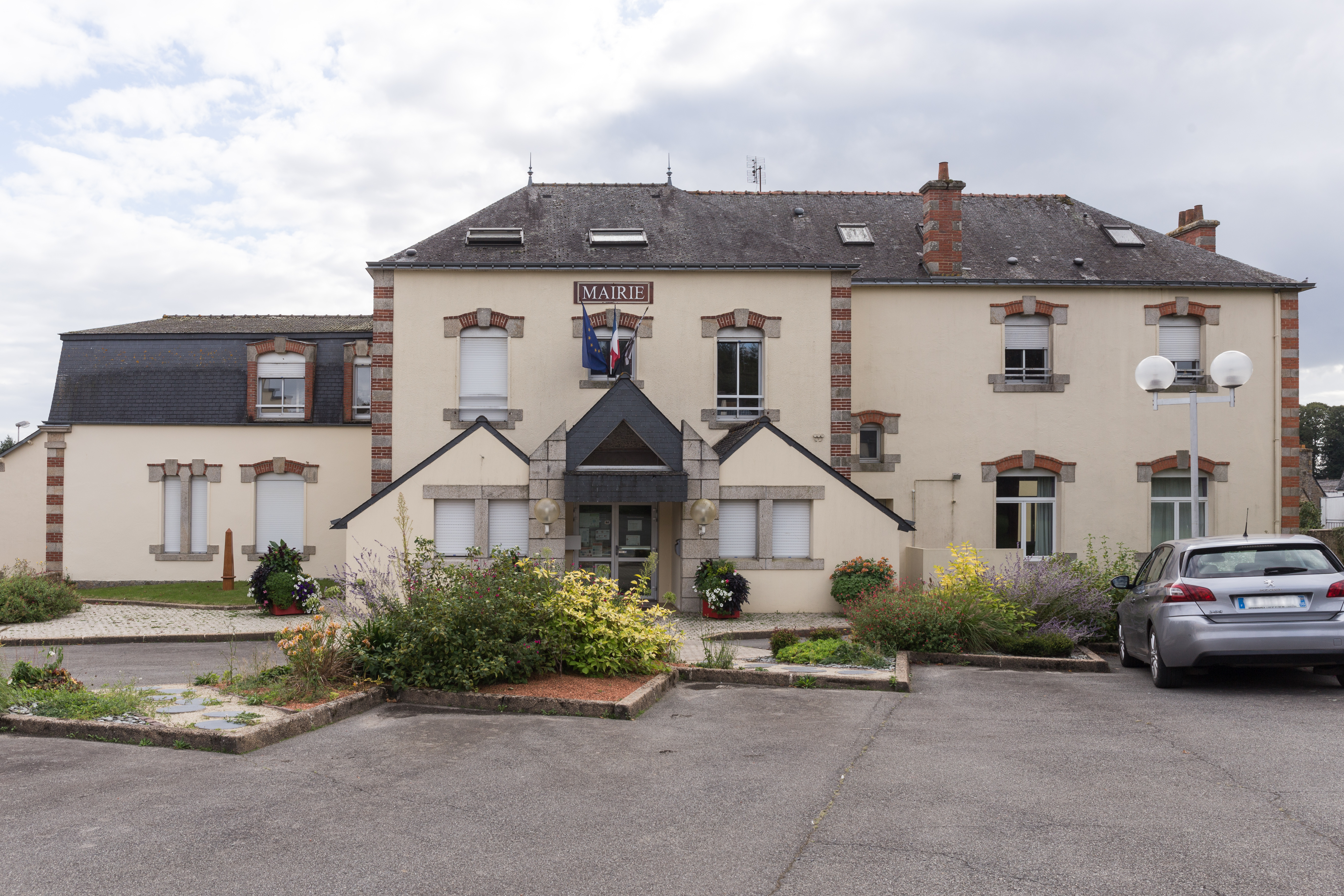
- Town hall

- Coat of arms
- Location of Moustoir-Remungol
- Location within France Location within Brittany
- Coordinates: 47°59′50″N 2°54′06″W
- Country: France
- Region: Brittany
- Department: Morbihan
- Arrondissement: Pontivy
- Canton: Grand-Champ
- Commune: Évellys
- Area^{1}: 12.42 km^{2} (4.80 sq mi)
- Highest elevation: 118 m (387 ft)
- Lowest elevation: 57 m (187 ft)
- Population (2022): 712
  - Density: 57.3/km^{2} (148/sq mi)
- Time zone: UTC+01:00 (CET)
  - Summer (DST): UTC+02:00 (CEST)
- Postal code: 56500
- ^{1} French Land Register data, which excludes lakes, ponds, glaciers > 1 km^{2} (0.386 sq mi or 247 acres) and river estuaries.

Moustoir-Remungol (French pronunciation: [mustwaʁ ʁəmœ̃ɡɔl]; Breton: Moustoer-Remengol) is a former commune in the Morbihan department of Brittany in north-western France.

== History ==
On 1 January 2016, Moustoir-Remungol, Naizin and Remungol merged becoming one commune called Évellys.

== Demographics ==
Inhabitants of Moustoir-Remungol are called in French Moustoiriens.

== See also ==
- Communes of the Morbihan department
