= Locqueltas =

Commune in Brittany, France

Locqueltas Lokeltaz
- Commune
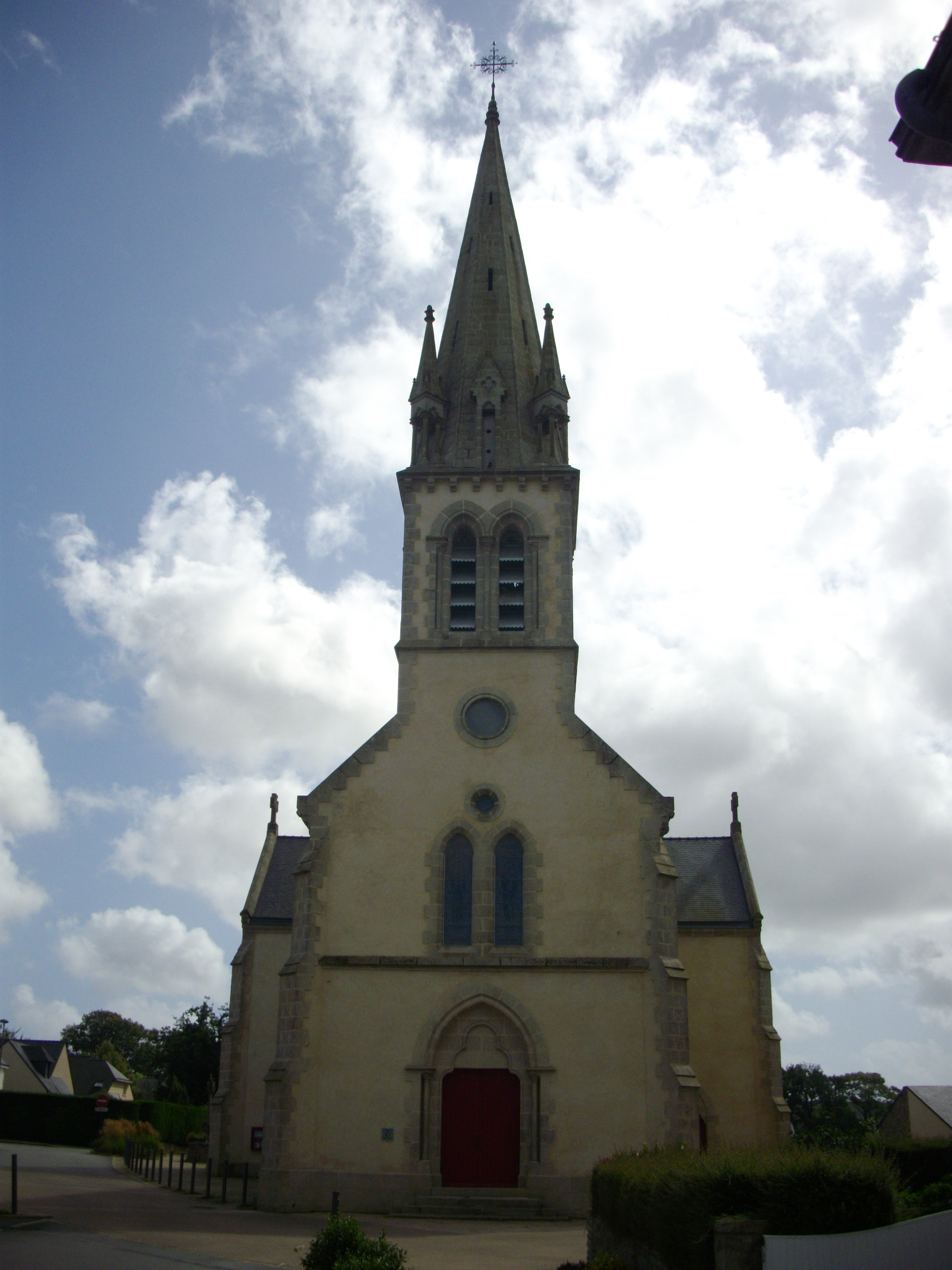
- The church in Locqueltas

- Coat of arms
- Location of Locqueltas
- Location within France Location within Brittany
- Coordinates: 47°45′28″N 2°45′54″W
- Country: France
- Region: Brittany
- Department: Morbihan
- Arrondissement: Vannes
- Canton: Grand-Champ
- Intercommunality: Golfe du Morbihan - Vannes Agglomération

Government
  - Mayor (2026–32): Michel Guerneve
- Area^{1}: 19.46 km^{2} (7.51 sq mi)
- Highest elevation: 144 m (472 ft)
- Lowest elevation: 53 m (174 ft)
- Population (2023): 2,031
  - Density: 104.4/km^{2} (270.3/sq mi)
- Time zone: UTC+01:00 (CET)
  - Summer (DST): UTC+02:00 (CEST)
- INSEE/Postal code: 56120 /56390
- ^{1} French Land Register data, which excludes lakes, ponds, glaciers > 1 km^{2} (0.386 sq mi or 247 acres) and river estuaries.

Locqueltas (French pronunciation: [lɔkɛltas]; Breton: Lokeltaz) is a commune in the Morbihan department of Brittany in north-western France.

== Population ==
Historical population
Year	Pop.	±% p.a.
1968	744	—
1975	745	+0.02%
1982	1,056	+5.11%
1990	1,128	+0.83%
1999	1,215	+0.83%
2007	1,519	+2.83%
2012	1,647	+1.63%
2017	1,758	+1.31%
2023	2,031	+2.44%
Source: INSEE

== Toponymy ==
From the Breton lok which means hermitage (cf.: Locminé), and Gweltaz which is the Breton name for Gildas.

== See also ==
- Communes of the Morbihan department
