= Évellys =

Commune in Brittany, France

- Commune
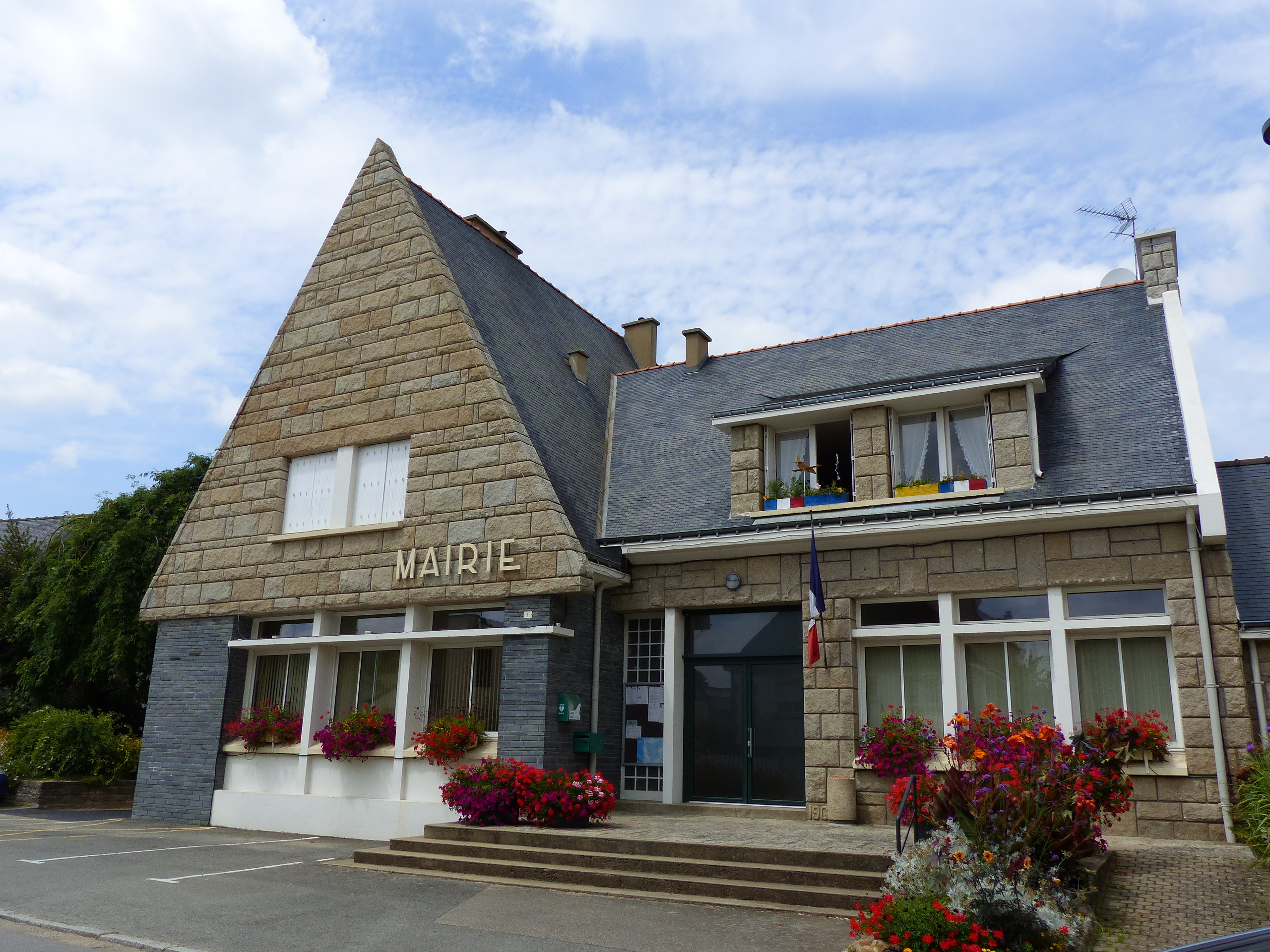
- Town hall in Naizin.
- Location of Évellys
- Location within France Location within Brittany
- Coordinates: 47°59′24″N 2°49′50″W
- Country: France
- Region: Brittany
- Department: Morbihan
- Arrondissement: Pontivy
- Canton: Grand-Champ

Government
  - Mayor (2026–32): Philippe Cadoret
- Area^{1}: 80.34 km^{2} (31.02 sq mi)
- Highest elevation: 136 m (446 ft)
- Lowest elevation: 42 m (138 ft)
- Population (2023): 3,379
  - Density: 42.06/km^{2} (108.9/sq mi)
- Time zone: UTC+01:00 (CET)
  - Summer (DST): UTC+02:00 (CEST)
- INSEE/Postal code: 56144 /56500
- ^{1} French Land Register data, which excludes lakes, ponds, glaciers > 1 km^{2} (0.386 sq mi or 247 acres) and river estuaries.

Évellys (French pronunciation: [evlis]; Breton: Eveliz) is a commune in the Morbihan department of Brittany in north-western France. Naizin is the municipal seat.

== Population ==
Population data refer to the area corresponding with the commune as of January 2025.

Historical population
Year	Pop.	±% p.a.
1968	3,757	—
1975	3,410	−1.37%
1982	3,230	−0.77%
1990	3,019	−0.84%
1999	3,021	+0.01%
2007	3,216	+0.78%
2012	3,359	+0.87%
2017	3,482	+0.72%
2023	3,379	−0.50%
Source: INSEE

== History ==
On 1 January 2016, Évellys was created by the merger of Moustoir-Remungol, Naizin and Remungol.
