= Guénin =

Commune in Brittany, France

Guénin Gwennin
- Commune
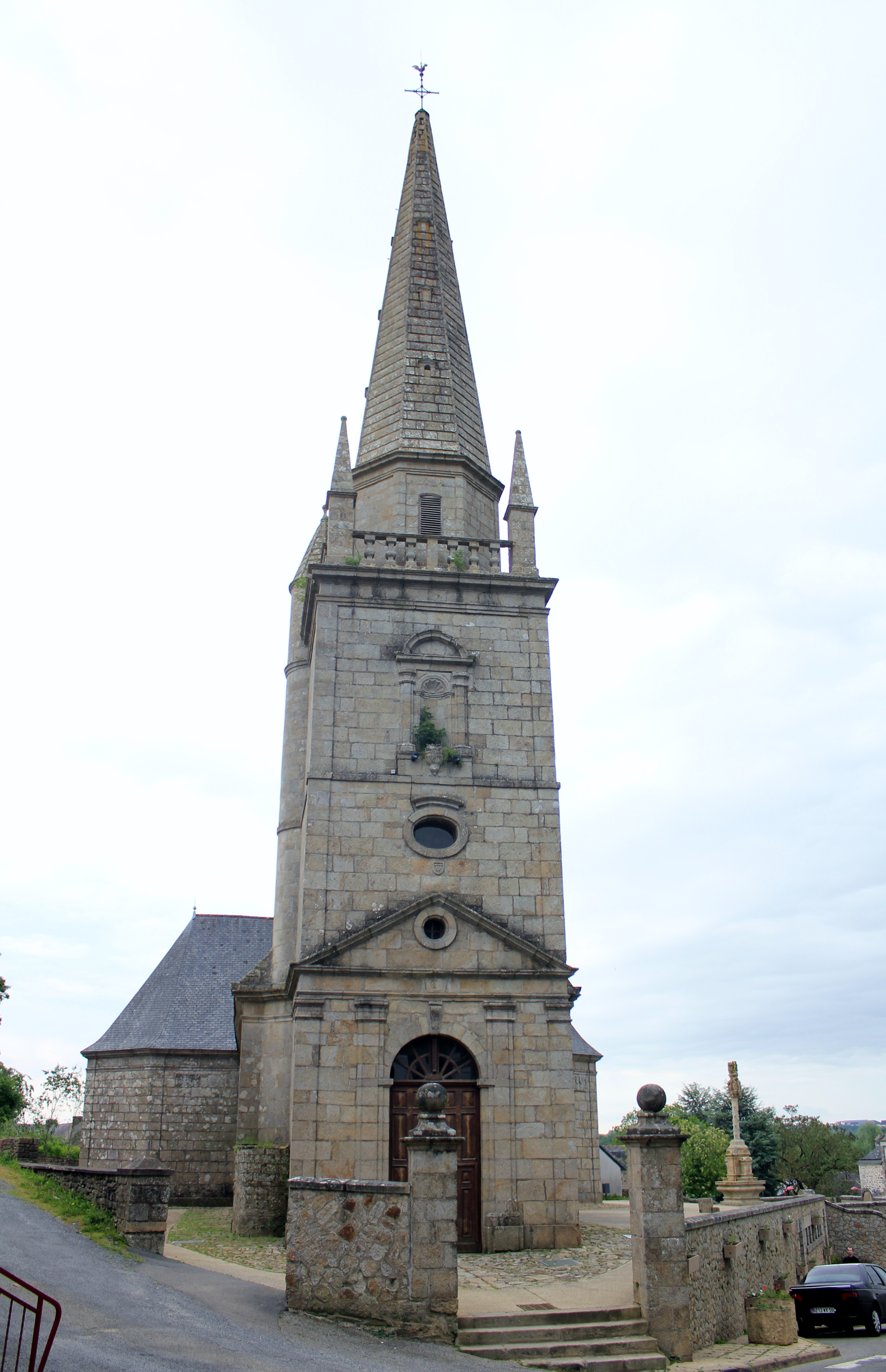
- The church of Saint-Guénin, in Guénin

- Coat of arms
- Location of Guénin
- Location within France Location within Brittany
- Coordinates: 47°54′28″N 2°58′46″W
- Country: France
- Region: Brittany
- Department: Morbihan
- Arrondissement: Pontivy
- Canton: Pontivy
- Intercommunality: Baud Communauté

Government
  - Mayor (2026–32): Anthony Onno
- Area^{1}: 28.71 km^{2} (11.08 sq mi)
- Highest elevation: 152 m (499 ft)
- Lowest elevation: 32 m (105 ft)
- Population (2023): 1,921
  - Density: 66.91/km^{2} (173.3/sq mi)
- Time zone: UTC+01:00 (CET)
  - Summer (DST): UTC+02:00 (CEST)
- INSEE/Postal code: 56074 /56150
- ^{1} French Land Register data, which excludes lakes, ponds, glaciers > 1 km^{2} (0.386 sq mi or 247 acres) and river estuaries.

Guénin (French pronunciation: [ɡenɛ̃]; Breton: Gwennin) is a commune in the Morbihan department of Brittany in north-western France.

== Geography ==
The River Ével flows southwestwards through the middle of the commune and forms its south-western border.

== Demographics ==
The inhabitants of Guénin are called in French Guéninois.

== See also ==
- Communes of the Morbihan department
