= Baud, Morbihan =

Commune in Brittany, France

Baud Baod
- Commune
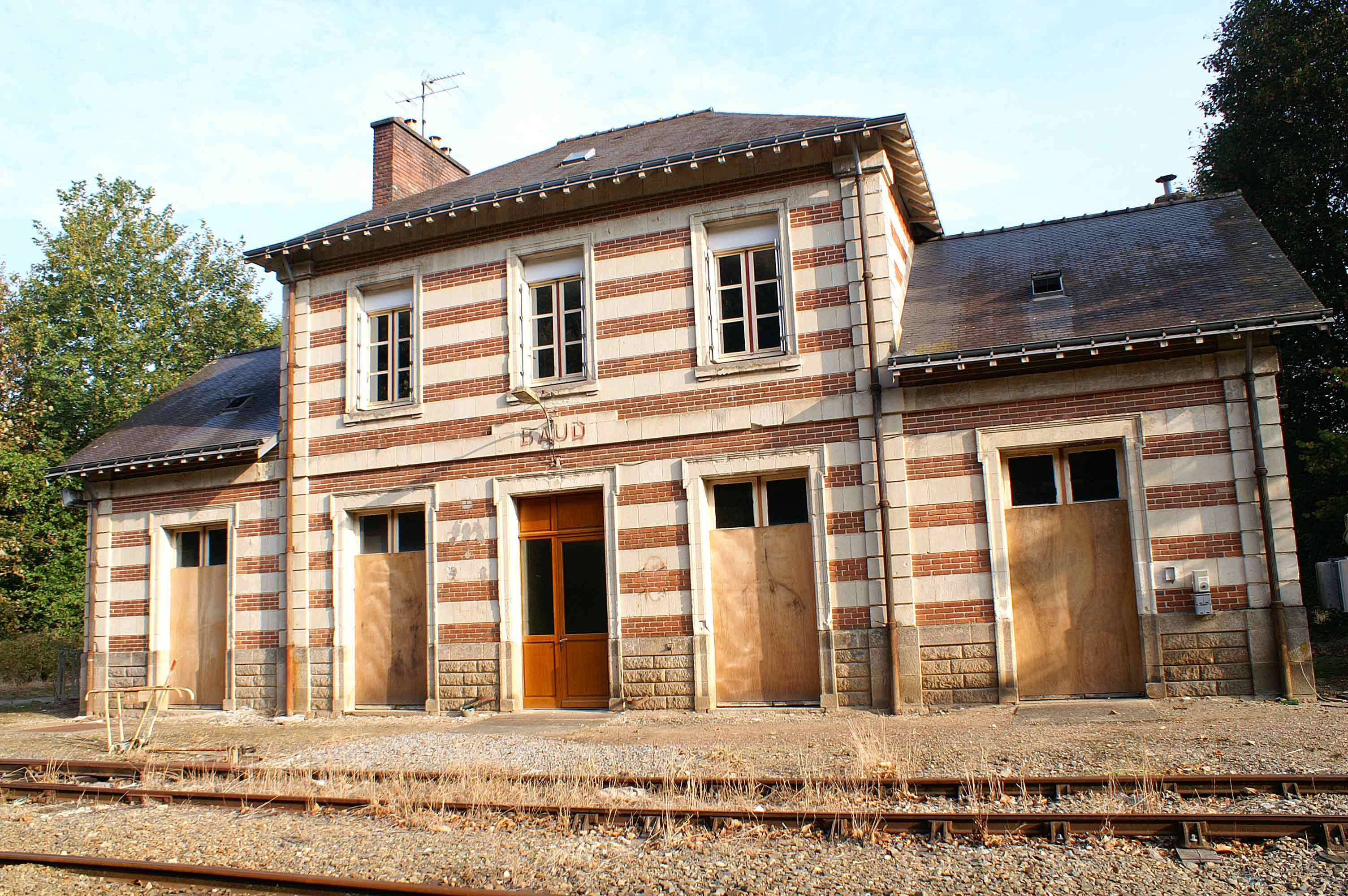
- Baud railway station

- Coat of arms
- Location of Baud
- Location within France Location within Brittany
- Coordinates: 47°52′35″N 3°01′04″W
- Country: France
- Region: Brittany
- Department: Morbihan
- Arrondissement: Pontivy
- Canton: Pontivy
- Intercommunality: Baud Communauté

Government
  - Mayor (2026–32): Pascale Gillet
- Area^{1}: 48.09 km^{2} (18.57 sq mi)
- Elevation: 88 m (289 ft)
- Highest elevation: 157 m (515 ft)
- Lowest elevation: 22 m (72 ft)
- Population (2023): 6,367
  - Density: 132.4/km^{2} (342.9/sq mi)
- Time zone: UTC+01:00 (CET)
  - Summer (DST): UTC+02:00 (CEST)
- INSEE/Postal code: 56010 /56150
- ^{1} French Land Register data, which excludes lakes, ponds, glaciers > 1 km^{2} (0.386 sq mi or 247 acres) and river estuaries.

Baud (Baod in Breton) is a commune in the Morbihan département in Brittany in northwestern France.

== Overview ==
There are many flower beds on the approaches to the town and in the area around the church. The "Town Centre" is the highest point of the town in the area besides the Church. Baud is essentially a market town, a location where the local farmers used to trade their goods for services. Baud is situated on the crossroads of two major roads bisecting Brittany: the North South Road, which links Saint-Brieuc and Saint-Malo on the north coast to the ancient towns of Vannes and Lorient on the south coast, and the East West Road which links Rennes (the capital of Brittany) to Quimper (an old cultural capital). The Quimper Road then continues on to the tip of Brittany at Brest.

Baud is the administration centre for a number of small villages in the vicinity. It has a police station, fire brigade, ambulance, a large secondary school, a school of music and dance - "la maison des arts", a library and a selection of sporting facilities including a swimming pool, tennis courts, two football fields and a stadium. It also has a number of primary schools including a diwan school teaching in the Breton language.

It has a fair range of social outlets. A cinema, the "Celtic", which is unusual in rural France, a nightclub called "Le Podium" and a selection of restaurants and pubs and similar. There is a small market held on Saturdays where animals such as rabbits, turkeys, ducks and chickens can be purchased. There are several supermarkets including Champion, Lidl, Intermarché and a number of bakeries. There are a number of pharmacies, medical doctors and nursing services in the town.

There are many festivals that take place in and around Baud. These include the beer festival, the camion cross, the auto cross, the music festival and the festival of traditional crafts.

The town's population is about 6000, and is growing each year. There are extensive small scale property developments particularly to the west of the town. Over the last few years, Baud has become popular as a location to have a holiday or retirement home and there is a growing number of estate agents.

The Blavet river basin is a local beauty spot. This river links with the Canal de Nantes à Brest at Pontivy. There are extensive cycle / pedestrian paths along the riverbank.

The famous statue Vénus de Quinipily is situated on the outskirts of Baud.

Baud is also home to the Musée de la carte postale, with a focus on images and artifacts of regional interest.

== Geography ==
The Ével forms most of the commune's eastern border, flows westward through the middle of the commune, forms part of its western border, then flows into the Blavet, which forms the commune's north-western border.

Baud is at the crossroad between Pontivy, Lorient and Vannes which makes Baud a good town to take a halt.

== Population ==
Inhabitants of Baud were called Baudais, but now they are called Baldiviens in French.

Historical population
Year	Pop.	±% p.a.
1968	4,814	—
1975	4,989	+0.51%
1982	4,925	−0.18%
1990	4,658	−0.69%
1999	4,813	+0.36%
2007	5,543	+1.78%
2012	6,081	+1.87%
2017	6,261	+0.59%
2023	6,367	+0.28%
Source: INSEE

== Breton language ==
In 2008, 10.7% of primary-school children attended bilingual schools.

== See also ==
- Communes of the Morbihan department
- Henri Gouzien, sculptor of Baud War Memorial
