= Ével =

River in France

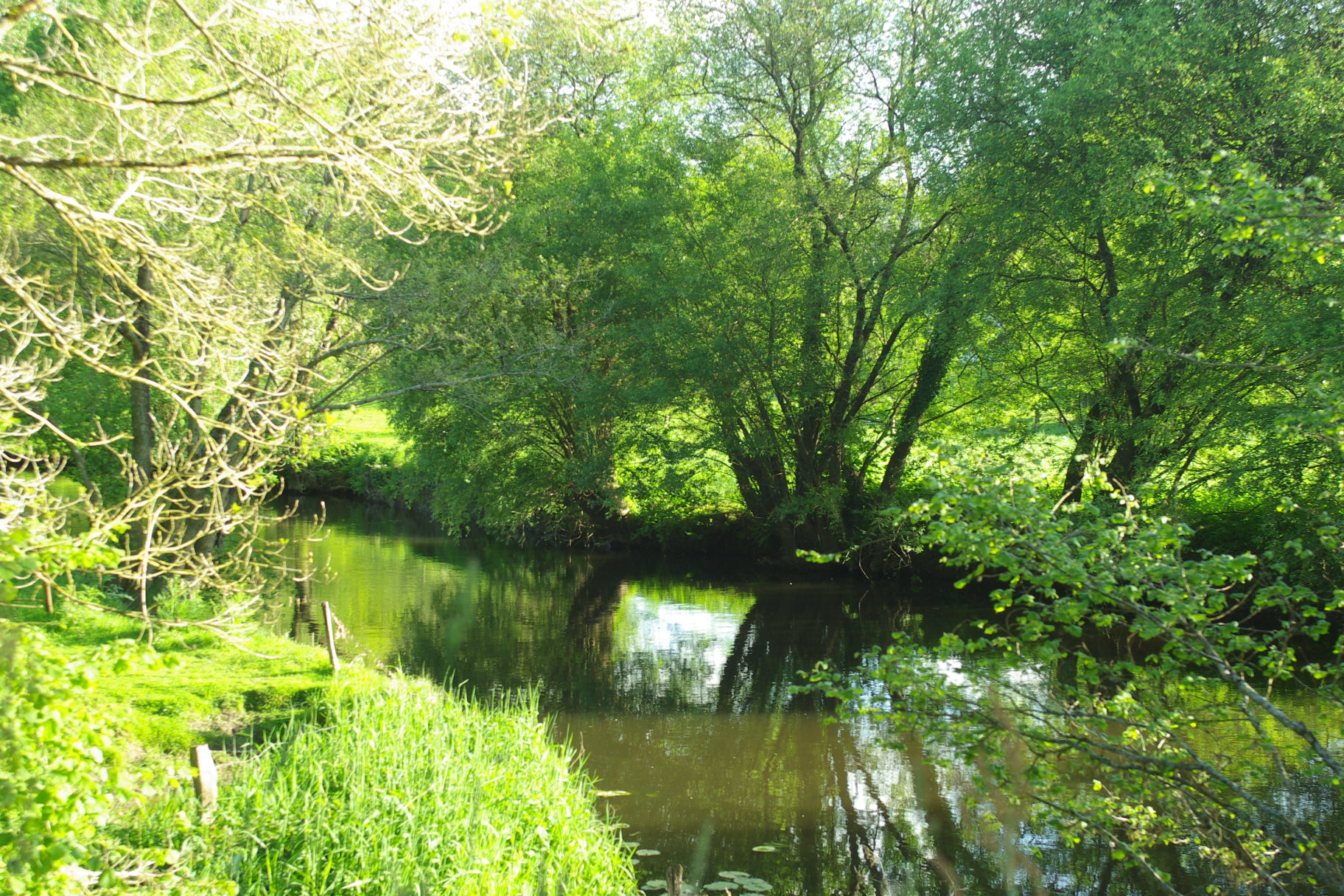

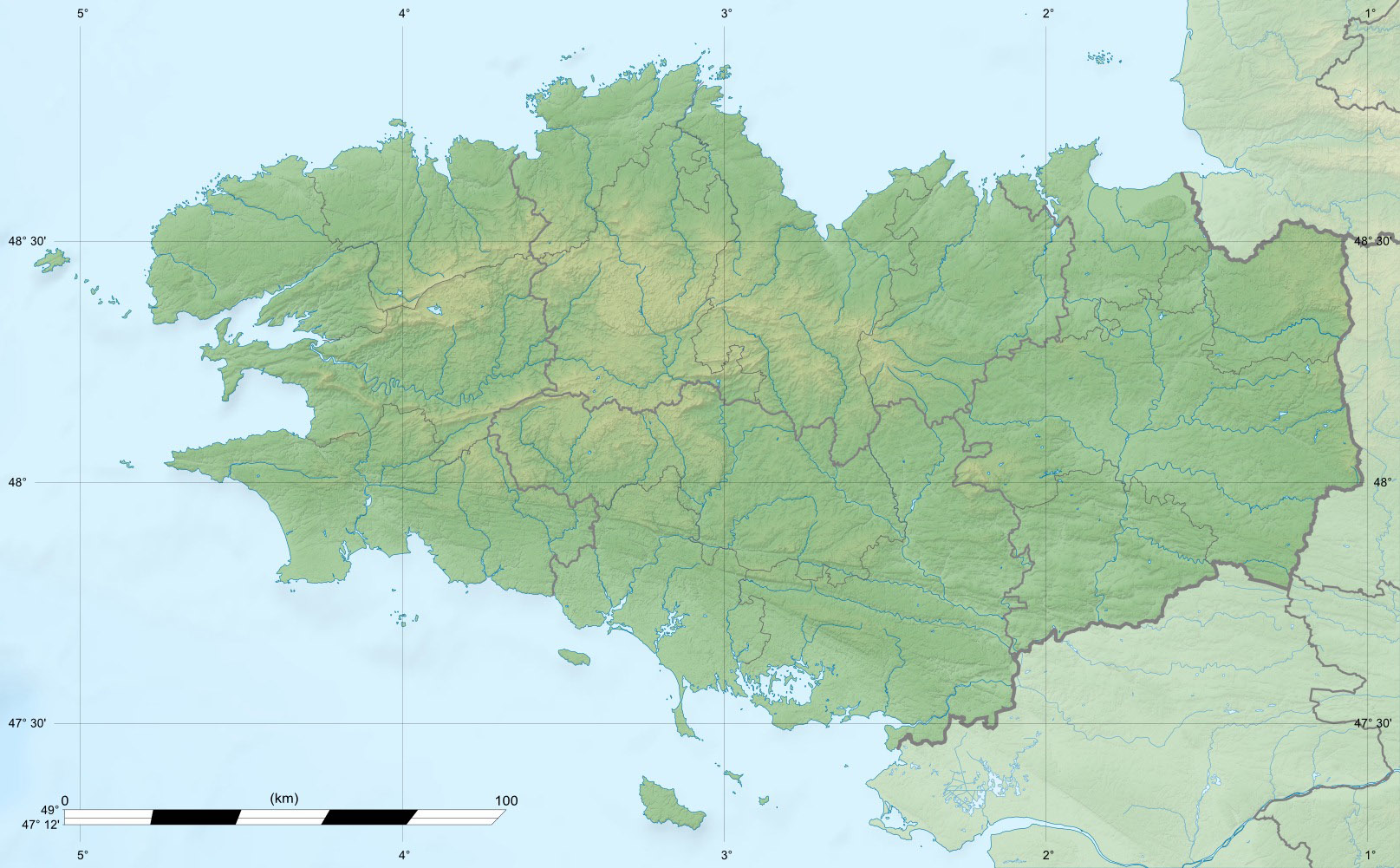
- Location within France Location within Brittany

Location
- Country: France

Physical characteristics
- Source
  - location: Radenac
  - coordinates: 47°56′20″N 02°42′33″W
  - elevation: 105 m (344 ft)
- Mouth
  - location: Blavet
  - coordinates: 47°52′58″N 03°06′39″W
  - elevation: 20 m (66 ft)
- Length: 52.4 km (32.6 mi)
- Basin size: 350 km^{2} (140 sq mi)
- Discharge
  - average: 3.29 m^{3}/s (116 cu ft/s)

Basin features
- Progression: Blavet→ Atlantic Ocean

The Ével (French pronunciation: [evɛl]; Breton: Evel) is a 52.4 km (32.6 mi) long river in the Morbihan département, western France. Its source is near la Bottine, a hamlet in Radenac. It flows generally west-southwest. It is a left tributary of the Blavet into which it flows between Baud and Languidic.

== Communes along its course ==
This list is ordered from source to mouth: Radenac, Réguiny, Moréac, Naizin, Remungol, Pluméliau, Guénin, Baud, Camors, Languidic,
