= Réguiny =

Réguiny Regini
- Commune
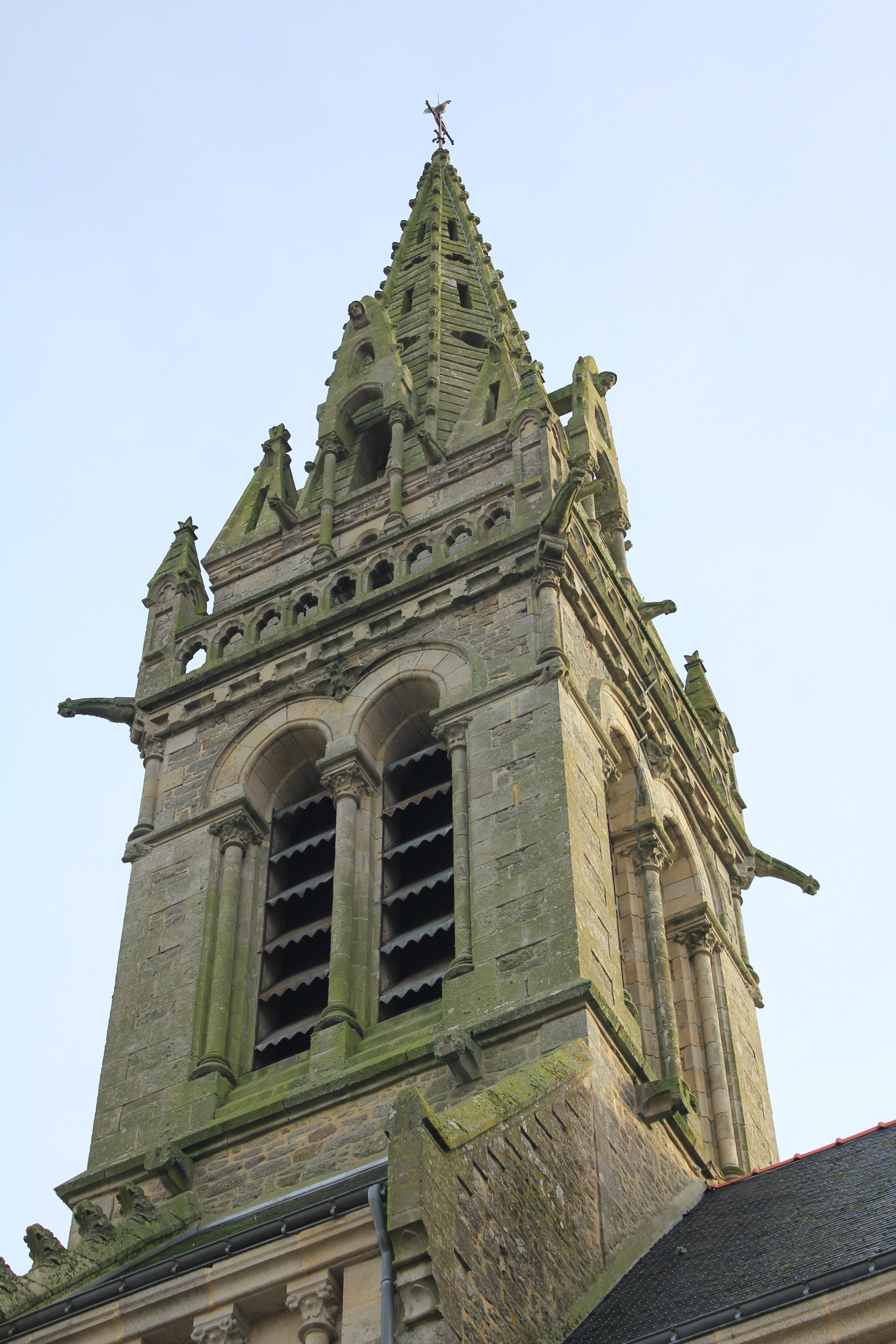
- The church of Saint-Clair, in Réguiny

- Coat of arms
- Location of Réguiny
- Location within France Location within Brittany
- Coordinates: 47°58′39″N 2°44′42″W
- Country: France
- Region: Brittany
- Department: Morbihan
- Arrondissement: Pontivy
- Canton: Grand-Champ
- Intercommunality: Pontivy Communauté

Government
  - Mayor (2026–32): Cédric Josso
- Area^{1}: 27.92 km^{2} (10.78 sq mi)
- Highest elevation: 129 m (423 ft)
- Lowest elevation: 61 m (200 ft)
- Population (2023): 1,955
  - Density: 70.02/km^{2} (181.4/sq mi)
- Time zone: UTC+01:00 (CET)
  - Summer (DST): UTC+02:00 (CEST)
- INSEE/Postal code: 56190 /56500
- ^{1} French Land Register data, which excludes lakes, ponds, glaciers > 1 km^{2} (0.386 sq mi or 247 acres) and river estuaries.

Réguiny (French pronunciation: [ʁegini]; Breton: Regini) is a commune in the Morbihan department of Brittany in north-western France. Inhabitants of Réguiny are called in French Réguinois.

== Geography ==
The river Ével forms most of the commune's southern border.

== See also ==
- Communes of the Morbihan department
