= Crédin =

Commune in Brittany, France

Crédin Kerzhin
- Commune
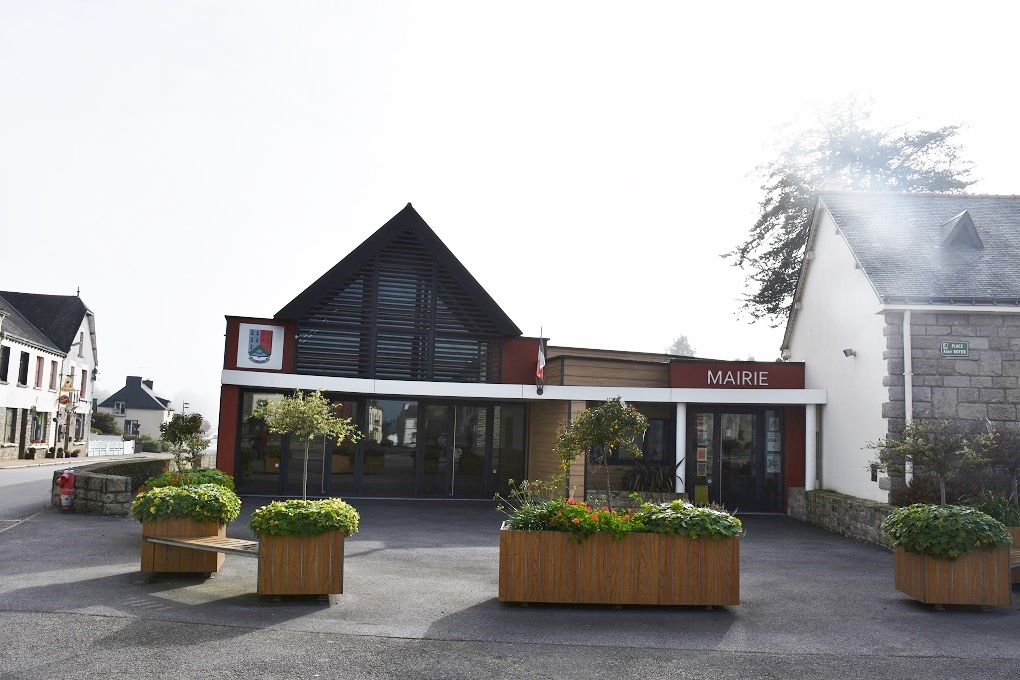
- Town hall

- Coat of arms
- Location of Crédin
- Location within France Location within Brittany
- Coordinates: 48°02′07″N 2°45′56″W
- Country: France
- Region: Brittany
- Department: Morbihan
- Arrondissement: Pontivy
- Canton: Grand-Champ
- Intercommunality: Pontivy Communauté

Government
  - Mayor (2026–32): Daniel Audo
- Area^{1}: 33.74 km^{2} (13.03 sq mi)
- Highest elevation: 139 m (456 ft)
- Lowest elevation: 52 m (171 ft)
- Population (2023): 1,483
  - Density: 43.95/km^{2} (113.8/sq mi)
- Time zone: UTC+01:00 (CET)
  - Summer (DST): UTC+02:00 (CEST)
- INSEE/Postal code: 56047 /56580
- ^{1} French Land Register data, which excludes lakes, ponds, glaciers > 1 km^{2} (0.386 sq mi or 247 acres) and river estuaries.

Crédin (French pronunciation: [kʁedɛ̃]; Breton: Kerzhin) is a commune in the Morbihan department of Brittany in north-western France.

== Demographics ==
Inhabitants of Crédin are called in French Crédinois.

== Geography ==
The canal de Nantes à Brest, which is the canalized river Oust, forms the commune's eastern border.

== Map ==
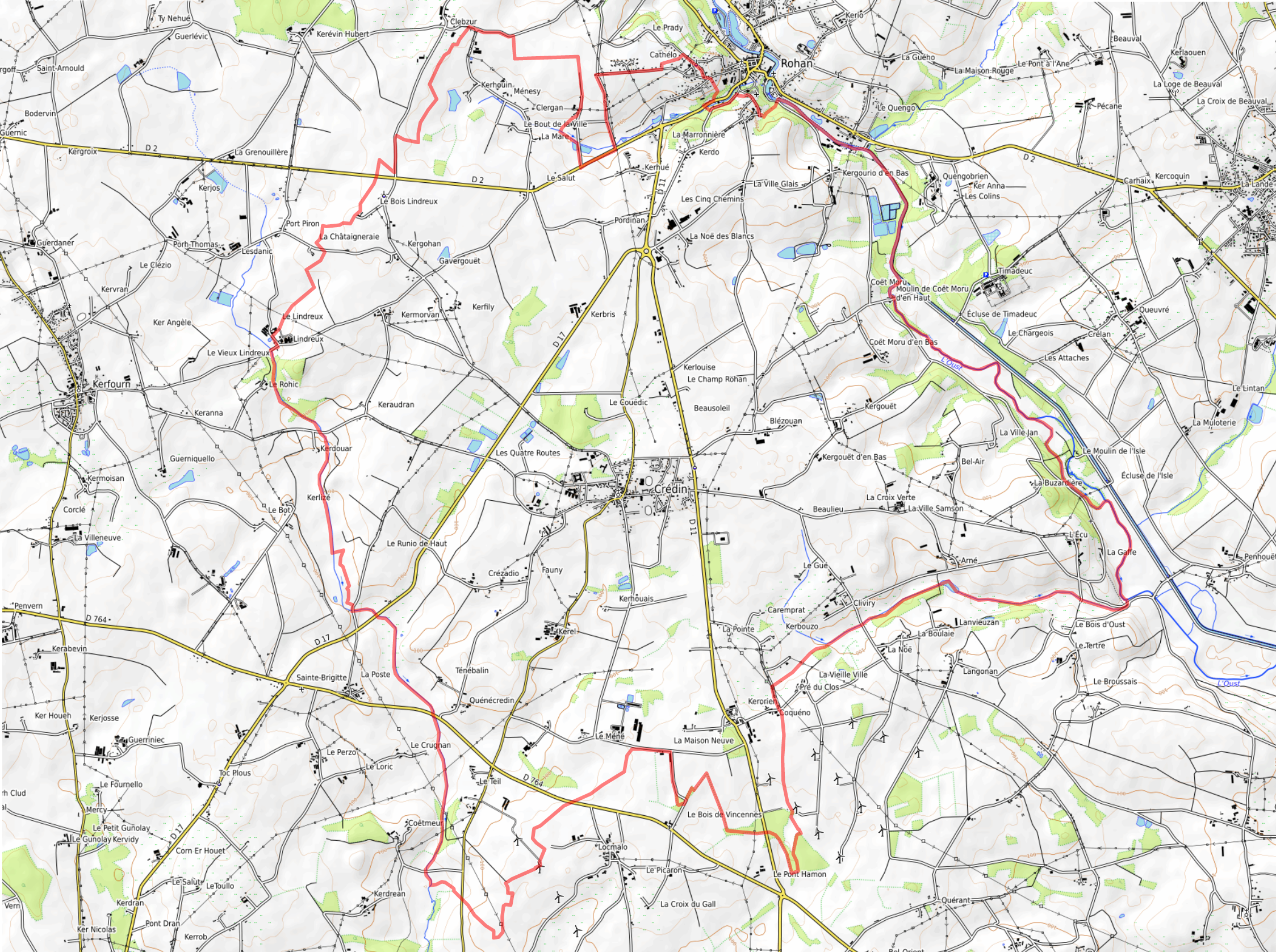
Topographic map

== See also ==
- Communes of the Morbihan department
