= Pleugriffet =

Pleugriffet Ploueg-Grifed
- Commune
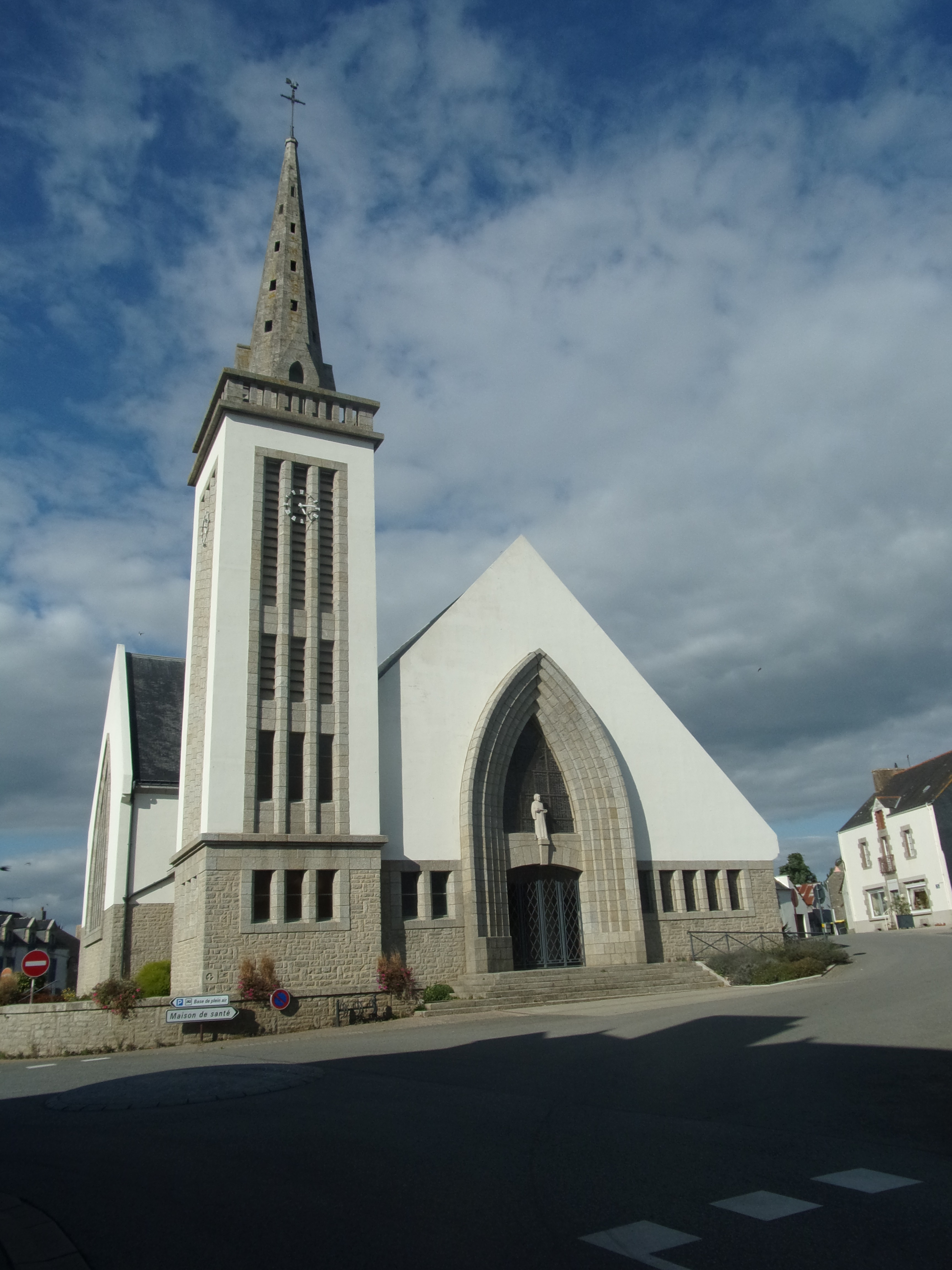
- The parish church

- Coat of arms
- Location of Pleugriffet
- Location within France Location within Brittany
- Coordinates: 47°59′25″N 2°41′04″W
- Country: France
- Region: Brittany
- Department: Morbihan
- Arrondissement: Pontivy
- Canton: Grand-Champ
- Intercommunality: Pontivy Communauté

Government
  - Mayor (2026–32): Luc Bovani
- Area^{1}: 38.49 km^{2} (14.86 sq mi)
- Highest elevation: 129 m (423 ft)
- Lowest elevation: 40 m (130 ft)
- Population (2023): 1,281
  - Density: 33.28/km^{2} (86.20/sq mi)
- Time zone: UTC+01:00 (CET)
  - Summer (DST): UTC+02:00 (CEST)
- INSEE/Postal code: 56160 /56120
- ^{1} French Land Register data, which excludes lakes, ponds, glaciers > 1 km^{2} (0.386 sq mi or 247 acres) and river estuaries.

Pleugriffet (French pronunciation: [pløɡʁifɛt]; Breton: Ploueg-Grifed) is a commune in the Morbihan department of Brittany in north-western France. Inhabitants of Pleugriffet are called in French Pleugriffetois.

== Population ==
Historical population

Year	Pop.	±% p.a.
1793	1,488	—
1800	1,439	−0.48%
1806	1,564	+1.40%
1821	1,531	−0.14%
1831	1,730	+1.23%
1836	1,629	−1.20%
1841	1,600	−0.36%
1846	1,663	+0.78%
1851	1,618	−0.55%
1856	1,627	+0.11%
1861	1,629	+0.02%
1866	1,688	+0.71%
1872	1,631	−0.57%
1876	1,638	+0.11%
1881	1,667	+0.35%
1886	1,794	+1.48%
1891	1,875	+0.89%
1896	1,972	+1.01%
1901	2,006	+0.34%

Year	Pop.	±% p.a.
1906	1,992	−0.14%
1911	2,005	+0.13%
1921	1,766	−1.26%
1926	1,790	+0.27%
1931	1,851	+0.67%
1936	1,774	−0.85%
1946	1,734	−0.23%
1954	1,625	−0.81%
1962	1,589	−0.28%
1968	1,528	−0.65%
1975	1,358	−1.67%
1982	1,198	−1.77%
1990	1,105	−1.01%
1999	1,124	+0.19%
2007	1,208	+0.90%
2012	1,181	−0.45%
2017	1,272	+1.50%
2023	1,281	+0.12%

Source: EHESS and INSEE (1968-2023)

== Geography ==
Pleugriffet is located 22 km (14 mi) northwest of Ploërmel, 23 km (14 mi) southeast of Pontivy and 36 km (22 mi) north of Vannes. The village belongs to upper Brittany. The commune is border by river Oust to the east. Apart from the village centre there are many hamlets in the commune.

== Map ==
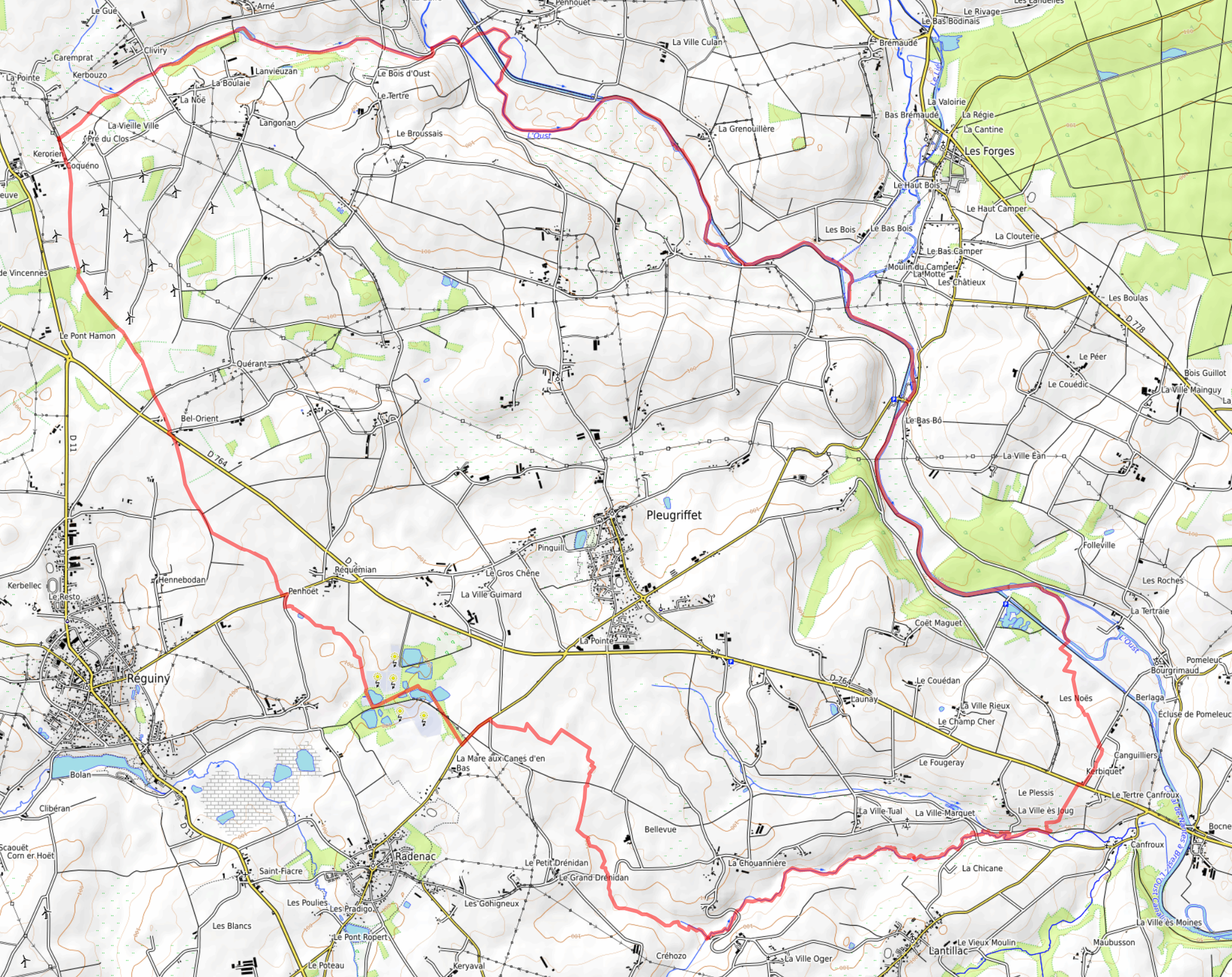
Topographic map

== History ==
From 1954, the present church was rebuilt following the plans of the architect Caubert. The church was consecrated on 12 August 1956 by bishop Eugène Le Bellec. It is a Neo-Byzantine style concrete building. It was built on the site of the old Romanesque church that it replaces.

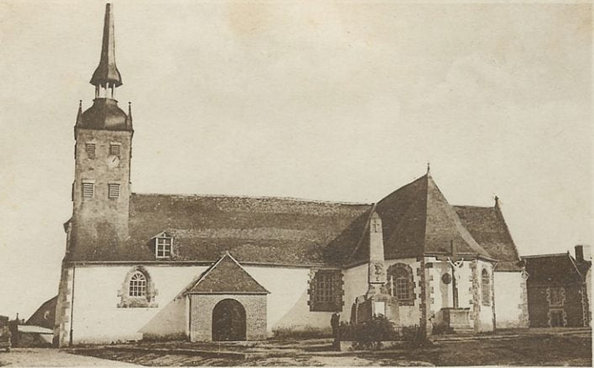
The old Romanesque church, now demolished.

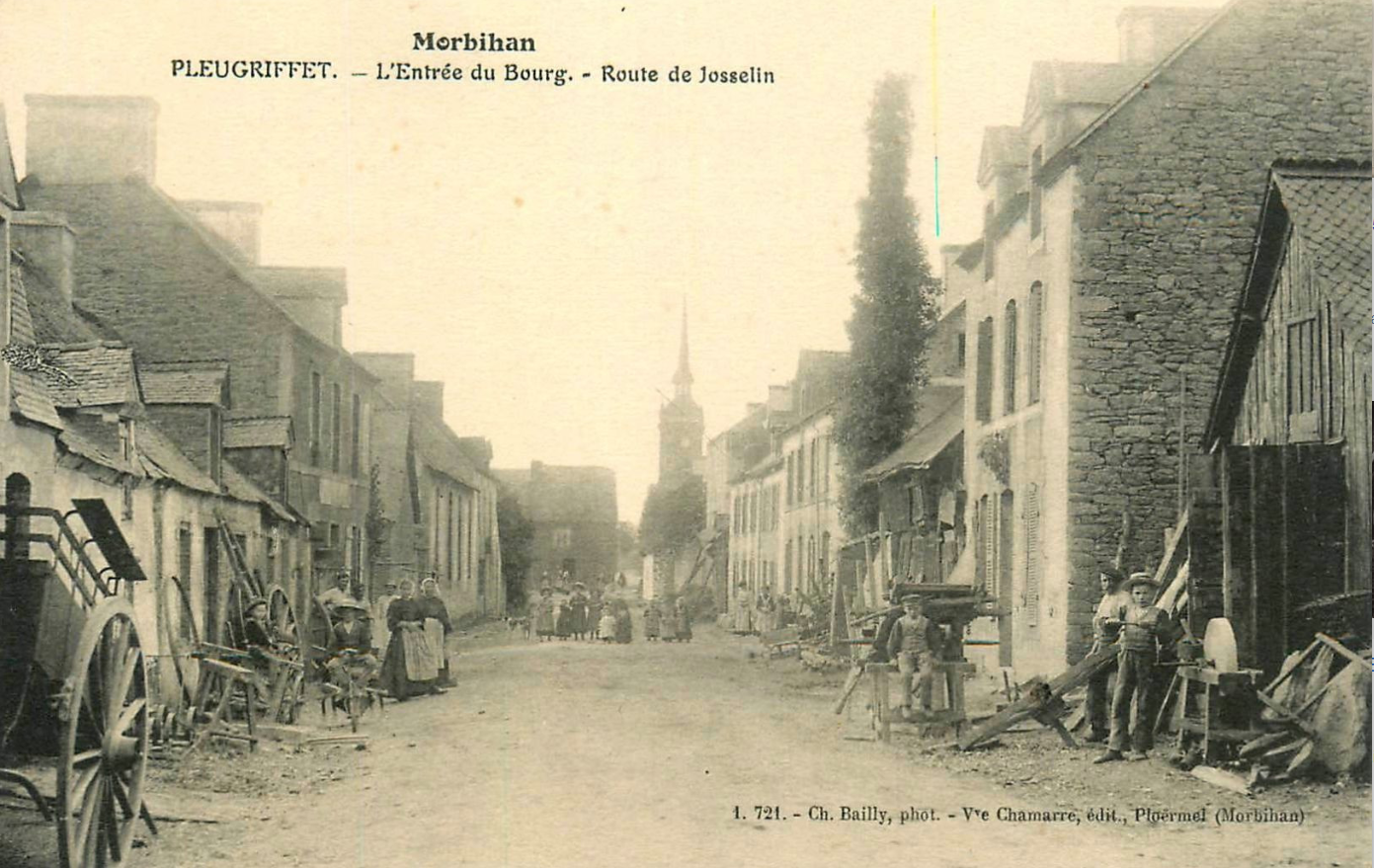
The village at the beginning of the twentieth century.

== Gallery ==
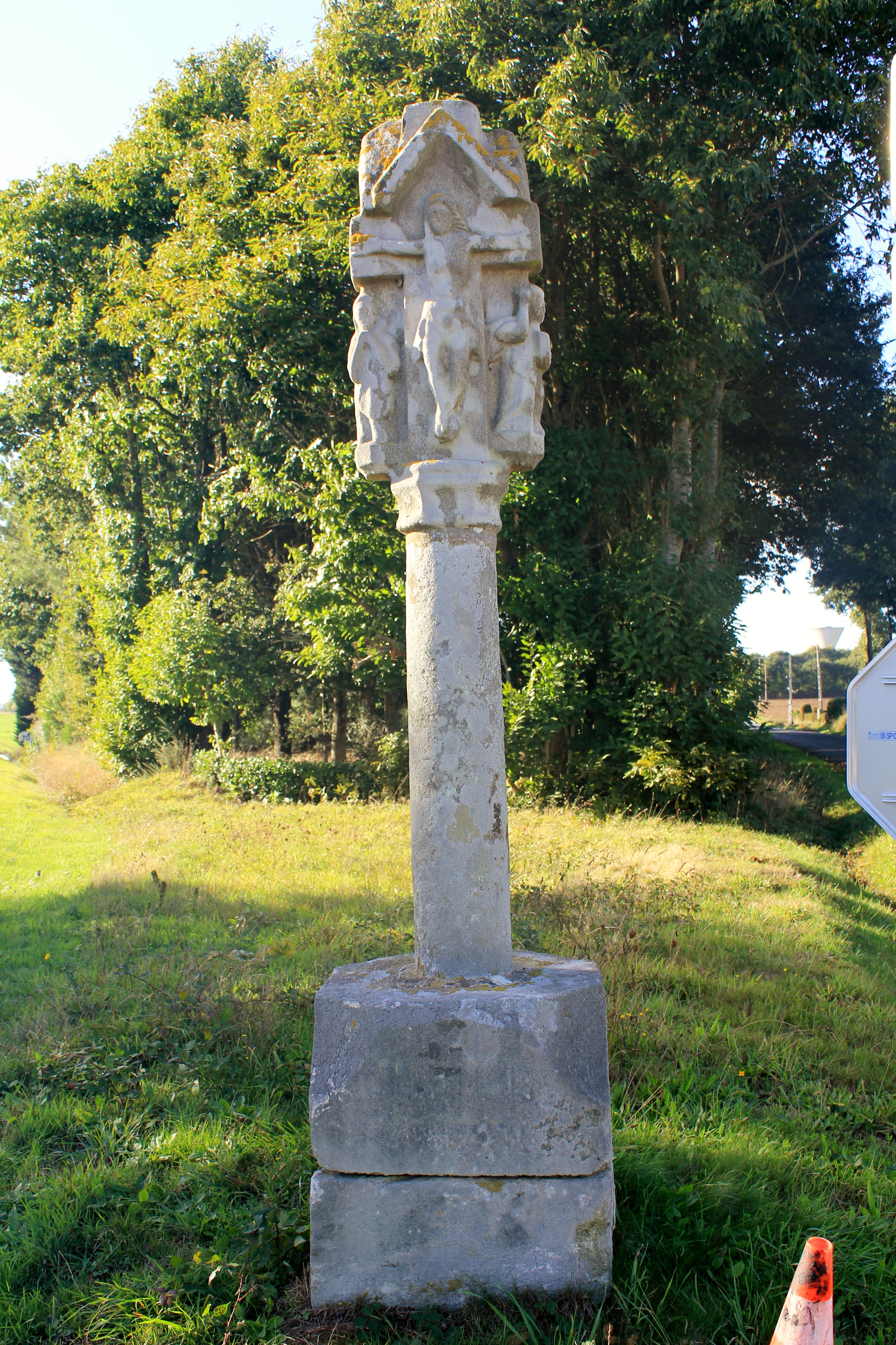
The cross of Landoma, in Pleugriffet

== See also ==
- Communes of the Morbihan department
