= Locmaria-Grand-Champ =

Commune in Brittany, France

Locmaria-Grand-Champ Lokmaria-Gregam
- Commune
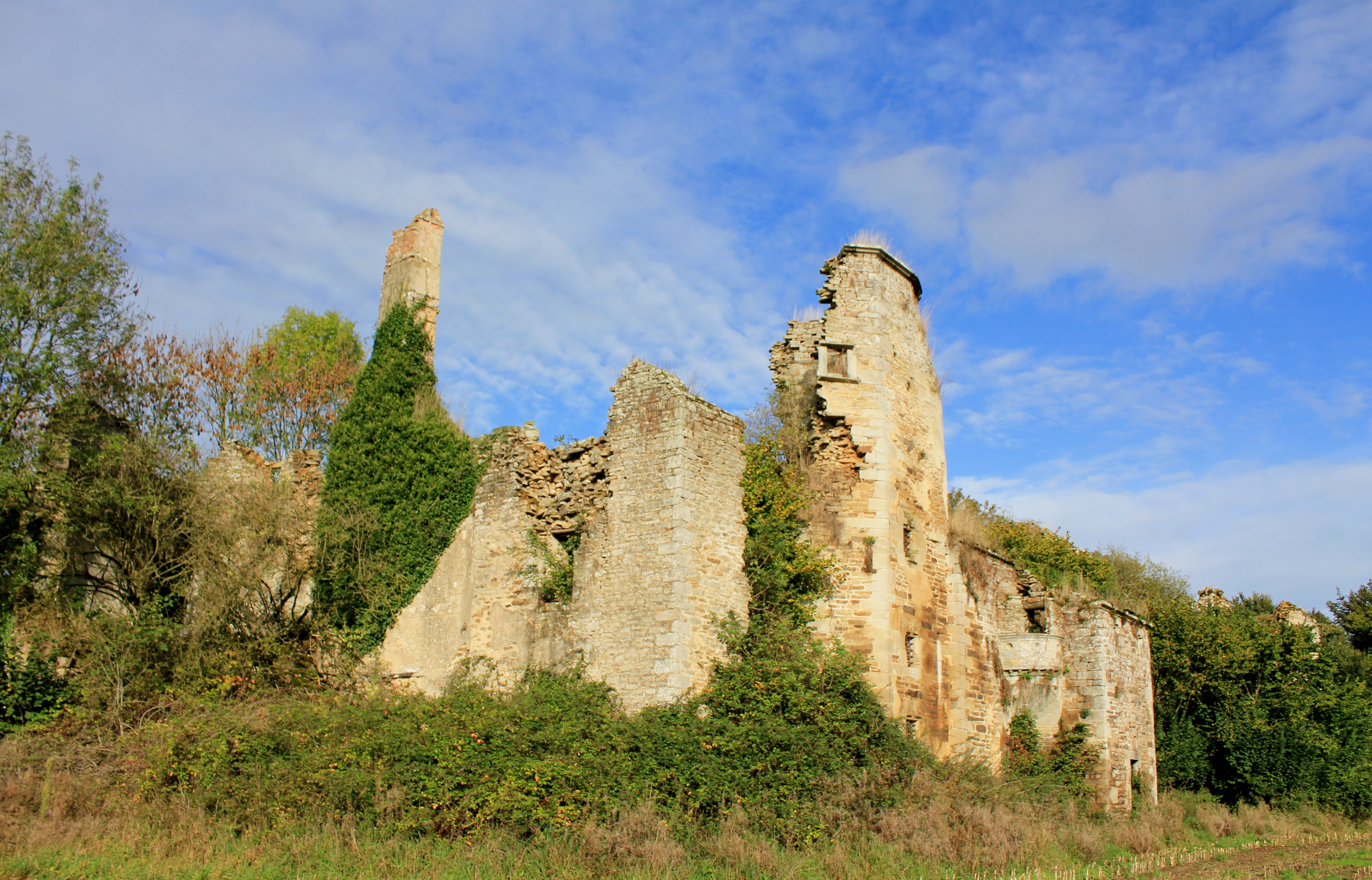
- The Château of Coët-Candec

- Coat of arms
- Location of Locmaria-Grand-Champ
- Location within France Location within Brittany
- Coordinates: 47°45′29″N 2°47′10″W
- Country: France
- Region: Brittany
- Department: Morbihan
- Arrondissement: Vannes
- Canton: Grand-Champ
- Intercommunality: Golfe du Morbihan - Vannes Agglomération

Government
  - Mayor (2026–32): Lionel Ulvoa
- Area^{1}: 14.06 km^{2} (5.43 sq mi)
- Highest elevation: 139 m (456 ft)
- Lowest elevation: 52 m (171 ft)
- Population (2023): 1,855
  - Density: 131.9/km^{2} (341.7/sq mi)
- Time zone: UTC+01:00 (CET)
  - Summer (DST): UTC+02:00 (CEST)
- INSEE/Postal code: 56115 /56390
- ^{1} French Land Register data, which excludes lakes, ponds, glaciers > 1 km^{2} (0.386 sq mi or 247 acres) and river estuaries.

Locmaria-Grand-Champ (French pronunciation: [lɔkmaʁja gʁɑ̃ ʃɑ̃]; Breton: Lokmaria-Gregam) is a commune in the Morbihan department of Brittany in north-western France.

== See also ==
- Communes of the Morbihan department
