= Radenac =

Radenac Radeneg
- Commune
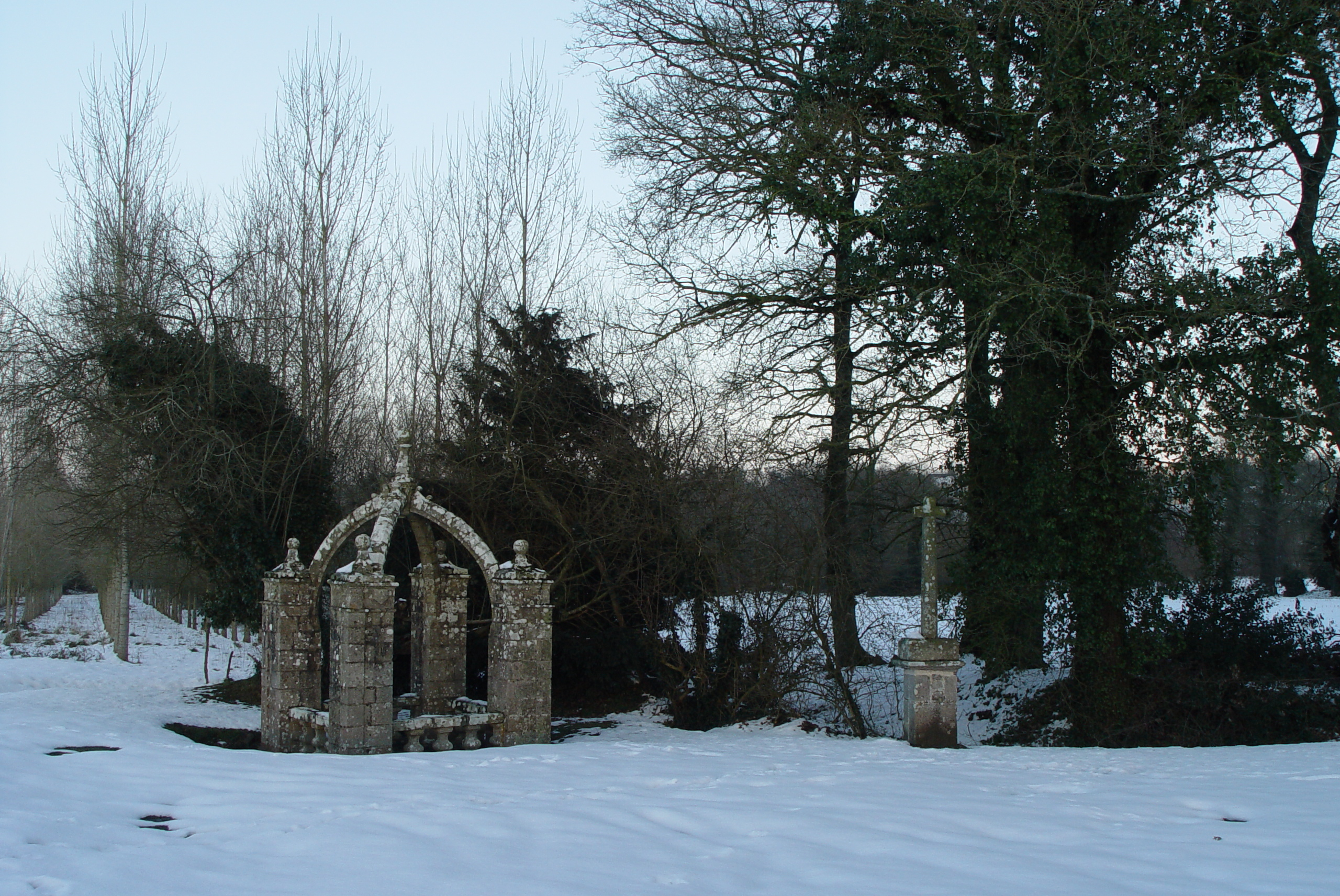
- Fountain of St Fiacre

- Coat of arms
- Location of Radenac
- Location within France Location within Brittany
- Coordinates: 47°57′49″N 2°42′41″W
- Country: France
- Region: Brittany
- Department: Morbihan
- Arrondissement: Pontivy
- Canton: Grand-Champ
- Intercommunality: Pontivy Communauté

Government
  - Mayor (2026–32): Bernard Le Breton
- Area^{1}: 21.65 km^{2} (8.36 sq mi)
- Highest elevation: 131 m (430 ft)
- Lowest elevation: 72 m (236 ft)
- Population (2023): 1,066
  - Density: 49.24/km^{2} (127.5/sq mi)
- Time zone: UTC+01:00 (CET)
  - Summer (DST): UTC+02:00 (CEST)
- INSEE/Postal code: 56189 /56500
- ^{1} French Land Register data, which excludes lakes, ponds, glaciers > 1 km^{2} (0.386 sq mi or 247 acres) and river estuaries.

Radenac (French pronunciation: [ʁadnak]; Breton: Radeneg) is a commune in the Morbihan department in Brittany in north-western France.

== Geography ==
The river Ével has its source in the commune.

== People ==
Cyclist Jean Robic, who won the Tour de France in 1947, spent his childhood in Radenac, where his father owned the local cycle shop. In honour of his great achievement, the commune renamed the street where his home was after him.

== Population ==
Inhabitants of Radenac are called Radenacois in French.

Historical population
Year	Pop.	±% p.a.
1968	1,004	—
1975	903	−1.50%
1982	807	−1.59%
1990	832	+0.38%
1999	825	−0.09%
2007	962	+1.94%
2012	1,004	+0.86%
2017	1,059	+1.07%
2023	1,066	+0.11%
Source: INSEE

== Twin towns ==
Radenac is twinned with a small village of Radnage in Buckinghamshire (United Kingdom) .

== Monuments ==
- The fountain of St Armel (circa 1000)
- The fountain of St Fiacre (17th century)
- The chapelle St Fiacre (construction 1390 to 1514).

== See also ==
- Communes of the Morbihan department
