= La Chapelle-Neuve, Morbihan =

Commune in Brittany, France

La Chapelle-Neuve Ar Chapel-Nevez
- Commune
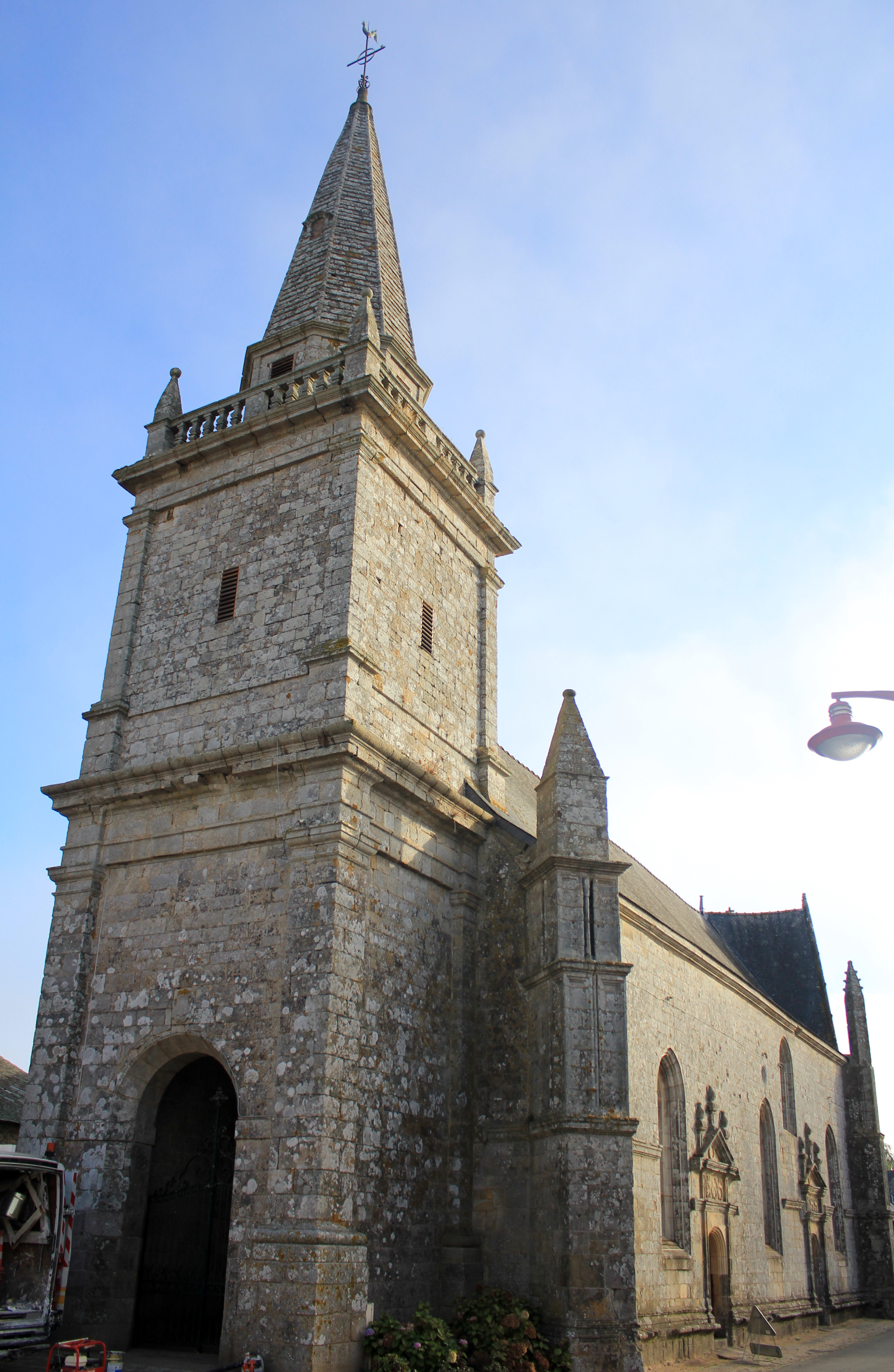
- The church of Notre-Dame-de-la-Fosse

- Coat of arms
- Location of La Chapelle-Neuve
- Location within France Location within Brittany
- Coordinates: 47°51′55″N 2°56′30″W
- Country: France
- Region: Brittany
- Department: Morbihan
- Arrondissement: Pontivy
- Canton: Grand-Champ
- Intercommunality: Baud Communauté

Government
  - Mayor (2026–32): Hélène Le Gars
- Area^{1}: 21.87 km^{2} (8.44 sq mi)
- Highest elevation: 149 m (489 ft)
- Lowest elevation: 35 m (115 ft)
- Population (2023): 1,001
  - Density: 45.77/km^{2} (118.5/sq mi)
- Time zone: UTC+01:00 (CET)
  - Summer (DST): UTC+02:00 (CEST)
- INSEE/Postal code: 56039 /56500
- ^{1} French Land Register data, which excludes lakes, ponds, glaciers > 1 km^{2} (0.386 sq mi or 247 acres) and river estuaries.

La Chapelle-Neuve (French pronunciation: [la ʃapɛl nœv]; Breton: Ar Chapel-Nevez) is a commune in the Morbihan department of Brittany in north-western France.

== Demographics ==
Inhabitants of La Chapelle-Neuve are called in French Chapelle-Neuvois.

== See also ==
- Communes of the Morbihan department
