= Grand-Champ =

Commune in Brittany, France

Grand-Champ Gregam
- Commune
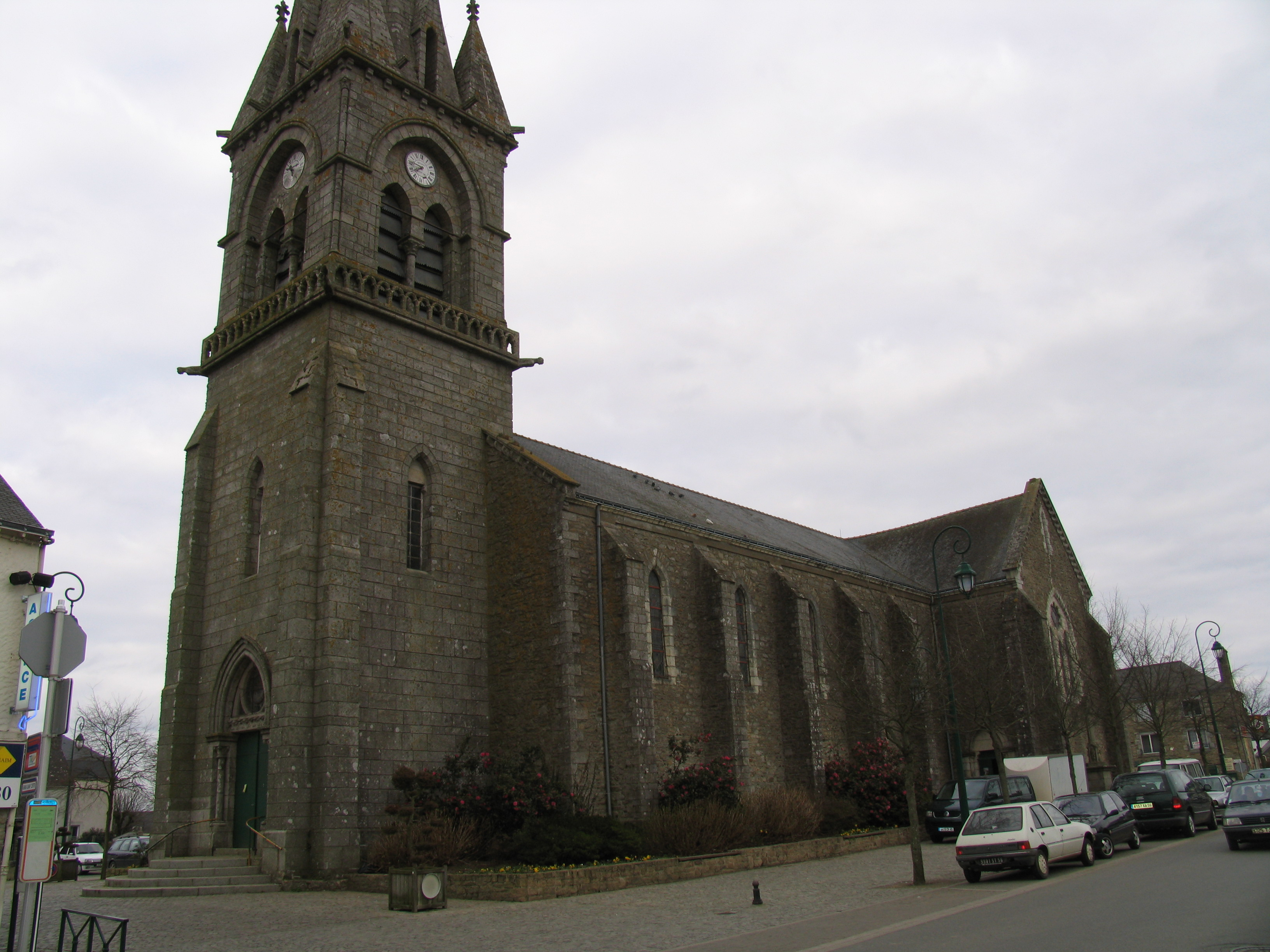
- The church of Saint-Tugdual

- Coat of arms
- Location of Grand-Champ
- Location within France Location within Brittany
- Coordinates: 47°45′33″N 2°50′36″W
- Country: France
- Region: Brittany
- Department: Morbihan
- Arrondissement: Vannes
- Canton: Grand-Champ
- Intercommunality: Golfe du Morbihan - Vannes agglomération

Government
  - Mayor (2026–32): Dominique Le Meur
- Area^{1}: 67.34 km^{2} (26.00 sq mi)
- Elevation: 127 m (417 ft)
- Highest elevation: 167 m (548 ft)
- Lowest elevation: 28 m (92 ft)
- Population (2023): 5,929
  - Density: 88.05/km^{2} (228.0/sq mi)
- Time zone: UTC+01:00 (CET)
  - Summer (DST): UTC+02:00 (CEST)
- INSEE/Postal code: 56067 /56390
- ^{1} French Land Register data, which excludes lakes, ponds, glaciers > 1 km^{2} (0.386 sq mi or 247 acres) and river estuaries.

Grand-Champ (French pronunciation: [ɡʁɑ̃ ʃɑ̃]; Breton: Gregam) is a commune in the Morbihan department of Brittany in north-western France.

== Demographics ==
Inhabitants of Grand-Champ are called Grégamistes in French.

Historical population
Year	Pop.	±% p.a.
1968	2,662	—
1975	3,052	+1.97%
1982	3,503	+1.99%
1990	3,897	+1.34%
1999	4,246	+0.96%
2007	4,754	+1.42%
2012	5,098	+1.41%
2017	5,404	+1.17%
2023	5,929	+1.56%
Source: INSEE

== Geography ==
The town is situated 15 kilometres northwest of Vannes.

== Breton language ==
In 2008 7.77% of children attended bilingual schools in primary education.

== History ==
- Bataille de Grand-Champ in 1795, during chouannerie repression.
- On 1 December 1870, the Balloon mail Bataille-de-Paris, created by Jules Antoine Lissajous starts from Gare du Nord in Paris, at this time besieged by Prussians, and ends 460 kilometers away in Grand-Champ.

== Places and monuments ==
- Saint Tugdual church (1866-1977). This church has, in its nave, two wooden-made panels coming from Notre-dame of Burgo Chapel.
- Chapel Notre-Dame-du-Perpétuel-Secours (1898).
- Chapelle Sainte-Brigitte à Loperhet (1560-1588).
- Chapel of Lopabu (around 1520).
- Chapelle Notre-Dame au Burgo (1520-1540) - historical monument.
- Chapel Notre-Dame-des-Fleurs au Moustoir des Fleurs (beginning of 15th century).
- Fountain de Loperhet (end of 16th century).
- Fountain de Burgo (1573) - historical monument.
- Calvary of Lopabu (1520).
- Moustoir des Fleurs calvary (16th century).
- Croix au centre du cimetière.
- Castle of Penhoët (1756) known simply as « Grand-Champ », owned by the Prince Obolensky, Arnaud Henry Salas-Perez.
- Castle of Rest (15th century).
- Manor de Kermainguy (15th century).
- Manor de Kerleguen (1427).
- Well of Locmeren-des-Prés.

== See also ==
- Communes of the Morbihan department
