= Locminé =

Commune in Brittany, France

Locminé Lominoec (Gallo) Logunec'h (Breton)
- Commune
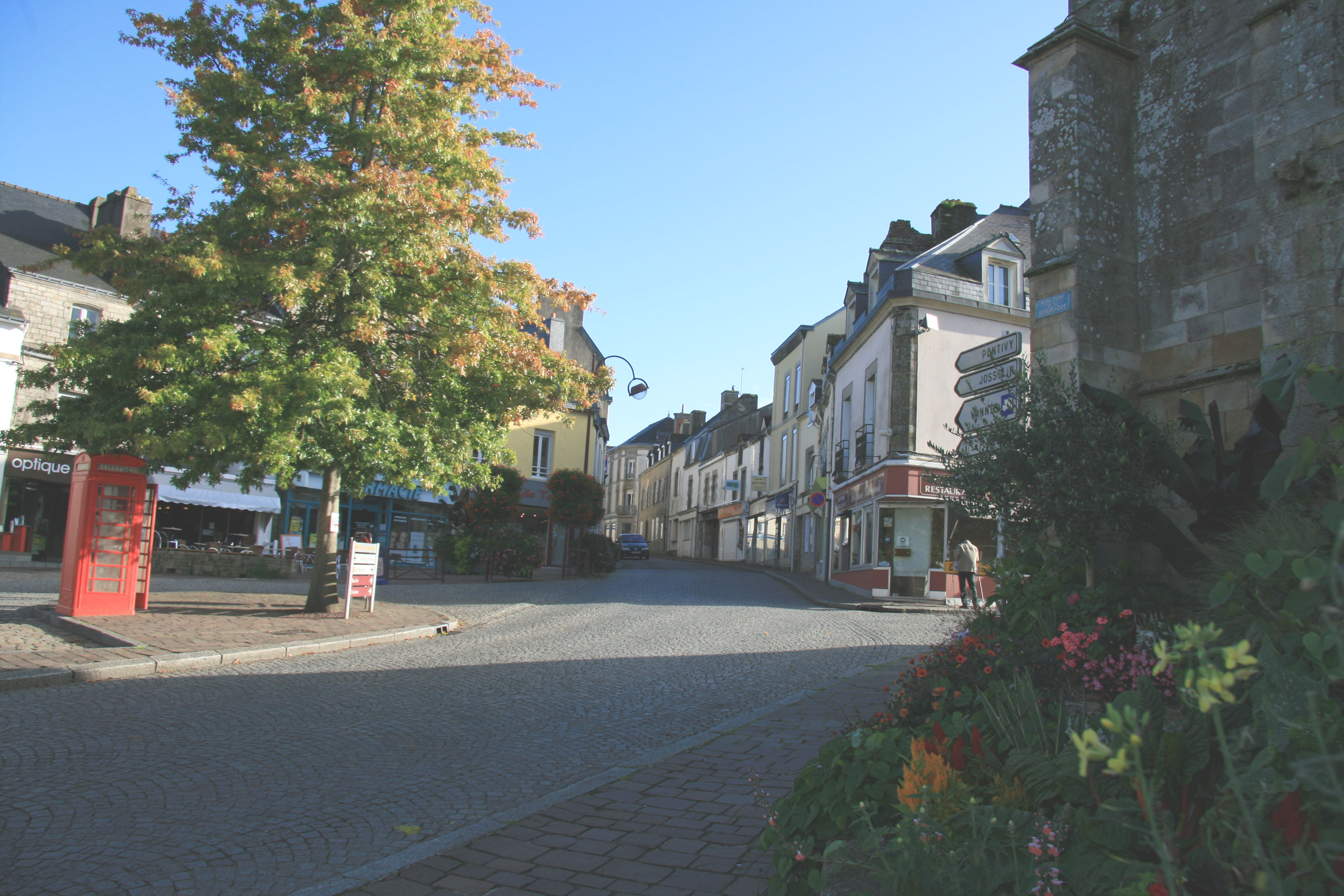
- The Place de la République in Locminé

- Coat of arms
- Location of Locminé
- Location within France Location within Brittany
- Coordinates: 47°53′15″N 2°50′04″W
- Country: France
- Region: Brittany
- Department: Morbihan
- Arrondissement: Pontivy
- Canton: Grand-Champ
- Intercommunality: Centre Morbihan Communauté

Government
  - Mayor (2026–32): Hugues Jéhanno
- Area^{1}: 4.86 km^{2} (1.88 sq mi)
- Highest elevation: 153 m (502 ft)
- Lowest elevation: 69 m (226 ft)
- Population (2023): 4,773
  - Density: 982/km^{2} (2,540/sq mi)
- Time zone: UTC+01:00 (CET)
  - Summer (DST): UTC+02:00 (CEST)
- INSEE/Postal code: 56117 /56500
- ^{1} French Land Register data, which excludes lakes, ponds, glaciers > 1 km^{2} (0.386 sq mi or 247 acres) and river estuaries.

Locminé (French pronunciation: [lɔkmine]; Gallo: Lominoec, Breton: Logunec'h) is a commune in the Morbihan department and Brittany region of north-western France.

The commune is listed as a Village étape.

== Toponymy ==
The name Locminé comes from the Breton Loc'h menec'h, itself from the Latin Locus monachorum – (sacred) place of the monks – after the monastery established here in 1008. Use of the term loc'h to denote the many small monasteries founded in Brittany between the eleventh and fourteenth centuries was commonplace, and this is the origin of the majority of parish names beginning in Loc-.

== Population ==
Historical population

| Year | Pop. | ±% p.a. |
|---|---|---|
| 1793 | 1,685 | — |
| 1821 | 1,491 | −0.44% |
| 1846 | 1,840 | +0.84% |
| 1872 | 1,710 | −0.28% |
| 1901 | 2,066 | +0.65% |
| 1926 | 2,340 | +0.50% |
| 1946 | 2,698 | +0.71% |
| 1962 | 2,442 | −0.62% |
| 1968 | 2,675 | +1.53% |

| Year | Pop. | ±% p.a. |
|---|---|---|
| 1975 | 3,396 | +3.47% |
| 1982 | 3,424 | +0.12% |
| 1990 | 3,346 | −0.29% |
| 1999 | 3,430 | +0.28% |
| 2007 | 3,978 | +1.87% |
| 2012 | 4,164 | +0.92% |
| 2017 | 4,332 | +0.79% |
| 2023 | 4,773 | +1.63% |

Source: EHESS and INSEE (1968–2023)

== Education ==
Locminé is home to the following educational establishments:

- Primary
  - École primaire privée Notre Dame du Plaske (ages 3–11)
  - École maternelle publique Réné Guy Cadou (ages 3–6)
  - École élémentaire publique Annick Pizigot (ages 6–11)

As of September 2019, 153 children (i.e. 22.5% of all those enrolled) were being educated in the bilingual (Breton / French) streams of Locminé's primary schools.

- Junior secondary ("middle schools")
  - Collège privé Jean-Pierre Calloc'h (ages 11–15)
  - Collège public Jean Moulin (ages 11–15)
- Senior secondary ("high schools")
  - Lycée professionnel privé Anne de Bretagne (ages 15+)
  - Lycée professionnel public Louis Armand (ages 15+)

The lycées professionnels are vocational high schools. Students from Locminé wishing to pursue "general" or "technical" courses (leading, potentially, to university-level education) must enrol at lycées further away, in, for example, Pontivy (22 km) or Vannes (26 km).

== Twin towns ==
Locminé is twinned with:

- (Germany) Medebach (North Rhine-Westphalia)
- Pontardawe (Wales)

== See also ==
- Communes of the Morbihan department
