= Canton of Grand-Champ =

Coordinates: 47.76°N 2.84°W

The canton of Grand-Champ is an administrative division of the Morbihan department, northwestern France. Its borders were modified at the French canton reorganisation which came into effect in March 2015. Its seat is in Grand-Champ.

It consists of the following communes:

1. Brandivy
2. Bréhan
3. La Chapelle-Neuve
4. Colpo
5. Crédin
6. Évellys
7. Grand-Champ
8. Locmaria-Grand-Champ
9. Locminé
10. Locqueltas
11. Moustoir-Ac
12. Plaudren
13. Pleugriffet
14. Plumelin
15. Radenac
16. Réguiny
17. Rohan
