= Simone Le Port =

French Resistance fighter (1920–2009)

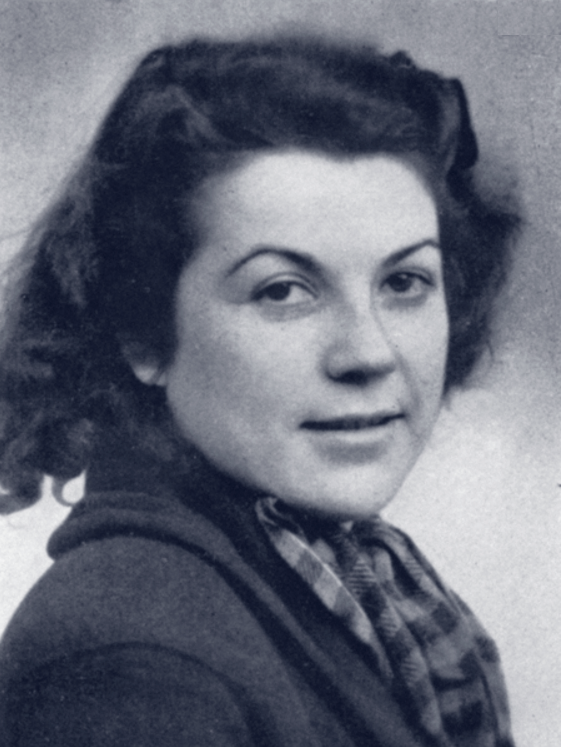
- Le Port (c. 1942)
- Born: Simone Le Pen; 3 July 1920; Inguiniel, France
- Died: 12 June 2009 (aged 88); Riantec
- Burial place: Étel, France
- Occupations: Resistance member, peace activist
- Known for: Undercover resistance in German-occupied France

Simone Le Port (born Le Pen) (3 July 1920, in Inguiniel – 12 June 2009, in Riantec) was a member of the French Resistance and a peace activist. After she was arrested by Gestapo forces, she was sentenced to hard labor and sent to Ravensbrück. She survived by escaping from a death convoy in 1945.

== Biography ==
Originally from Inguiniel, Simone Le Port joined the Resistance as a liaison. Her husband Julien had already become responsible for the air operations bureau of Morbihan (then Loire-Inferieure and Maine-et-Loire). She helped hide illegals, shelter those refusing compulsory labor service and stash weapons on their farm in Melrand, where they had settled. It was also a meeting place for the Resistance.

Activities at the farm were leaked to the Nazi forces. On April 16, 1944, 200 Germans surrounded the property. Simone urged the resistors, including the five members of the group (her husband, Julien and her two brothers, Robert and Aimé Le Pen), to flee. She remained on the farm with her young son. She was hoping that her surrender would prevent reprisals on the village, but when the troops found a parachute that was mistakenly left behind, Simone was arrested.

Even though she was tortured, she did not reveal the identities of her comrades. Le Port was sentenced to 25 years of hard labor and deported to the Ravensbrück concentration camp. There, with her fellow inmates, she was forced to dig antitank trenches. At one point she worked in a small shop manufacturing parts for Germany's infamous V1 rockets. While they worked in the factory, all workers received preferential treatment against the winter's cold. But when the factory was bombed by the Allies, she was assigned back to the trenches.

In April 1945, with Allied troops on their way to free them, the camp's convicts were moved by train and on foot deeper into Germany. On the way, Le Port managed to escape with a group of women and they were found quickly by other women fleeing the Nazis and who were in better physical condition. Members of the expanded group helped each other survive the long trip home.

Le Port finally reached the American zone on May 8, 1945. By the time she reached France via Belgium, she weighed only 35 kilograms (77 lb).

After the war, she moved to Étel with Julien, her husband, who became a signalman. On May 8, 1996, Étel named the bus station square after Simone and her husband.

She frequently visited classrooms to share stories about her wartime experiences and to advocate for peace. She died on June 12, 2009, and was buried in Étel.

== Awards ==
- Officier de la Légion d'honneur
- Croix de guerre 1939–1945
- Médaille du combattant volontaire de la Résistance
