= Quistinic =

Quistinic Kistinid
- Commune
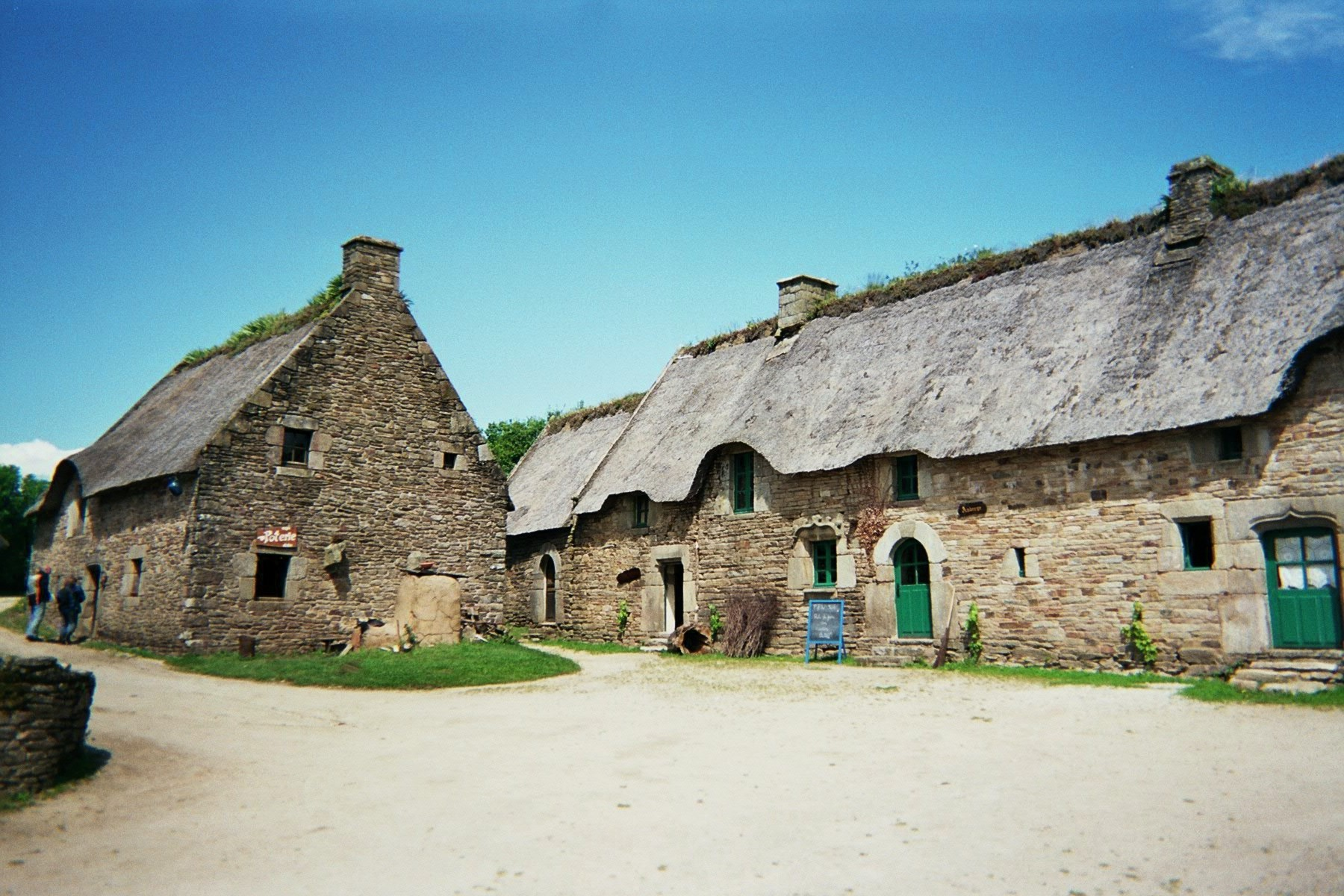
- The village of Poul-Fetan

- Coat of arms
- Location of Quistinic
- Location within France Location within Brittany
- Coordinates: 47°54′21″N 3°07′59″W
- Country: France
- Region: Brittany
- Department: Morbihan
- Arrondissement: Lorient
- Canton: Guidel
- Intercommunality: Lorient Agglomération

Government
  - Mayor (2026–32): Thibault Philippe
- Area^{1}: 42.95 km^{2} (16.58 sq mi)
- Highest elevation: 177 m (581 ft)
- Lowest elevation: 20 m (66 ft)
- Population (2023): 1,444
  - Density: 33.62/km^{2} (87.08/sq mi)
- Time zone: UTC+01:00 (CET)
  - Summer (DST): UTC+02:00 (CEST)
- INSEE/Postal code: 56188 /56310
- ^{1} French Land Register data, which excludes lakes, ponds, glaciers > 1 km^{2} (0.386 sq mi or 247 acres) and river estuaries.

Quistinic (French pronunciation: [kistinik]; Breton: Kistinid) is a commune in the Morbihan department of Brittany in north-western France. Its sister city is the rural village of Loughshinny, which is in County Dublin, Ireland.

== Population ==
The inhabitants of Quistinic are called Quistinicois in French.

Historical population

Year	Pop.	±% p.a.
1793	2,385	—
1800	2,090	−1.87%
1806	2,241	+1.17%
1821	2,132	−0.33%
1831	2,453	+1.41%
1836	2,481	+0.23%
1841	2,422	−0.48%
1846	2,491	+0.56%
1851	2,559	+0.54%
1856	2,336	−1.81%
1861	2,312	−0.21%
1866	2,377	+0.56%
1872	2,286	−0.65%
1876	2,403	+1.26%
1881	2,460	+0.47%
1886	2,430	−0.25%
1891	2,378	−0.43%
1896	2,382	+0.03%
1901	2,556	+1.42%

Year	Pop.	±% p.a.
1906	2,521	−0.28%
1911	2,555	+0.27%
1921	2,321	−0.96%
1926	2,565	+2.02%
1931	2,644	+0.61%
1936	2,639	−0.04%
1946	2,510	−0.50%
1954	2,226	−1.49%
1962	2,072	−0.89%
1968	1,901	−1.43%
1975	1,608	−2.36%
1982	1,517	−0.83%
1990	1,412	−0.89%
1999	1,312	−0.81%
2007	1,347	+0.33%
2012	1,419	+1.05%
2017	1,431	+0.17%
2023	1,444	+0.15%

Source: EHESS and INSEE (1968-2023)

== Toponymy ==
Quistinic is a word in the Breton language. It means "Chestnut Forest".

== Geography ==
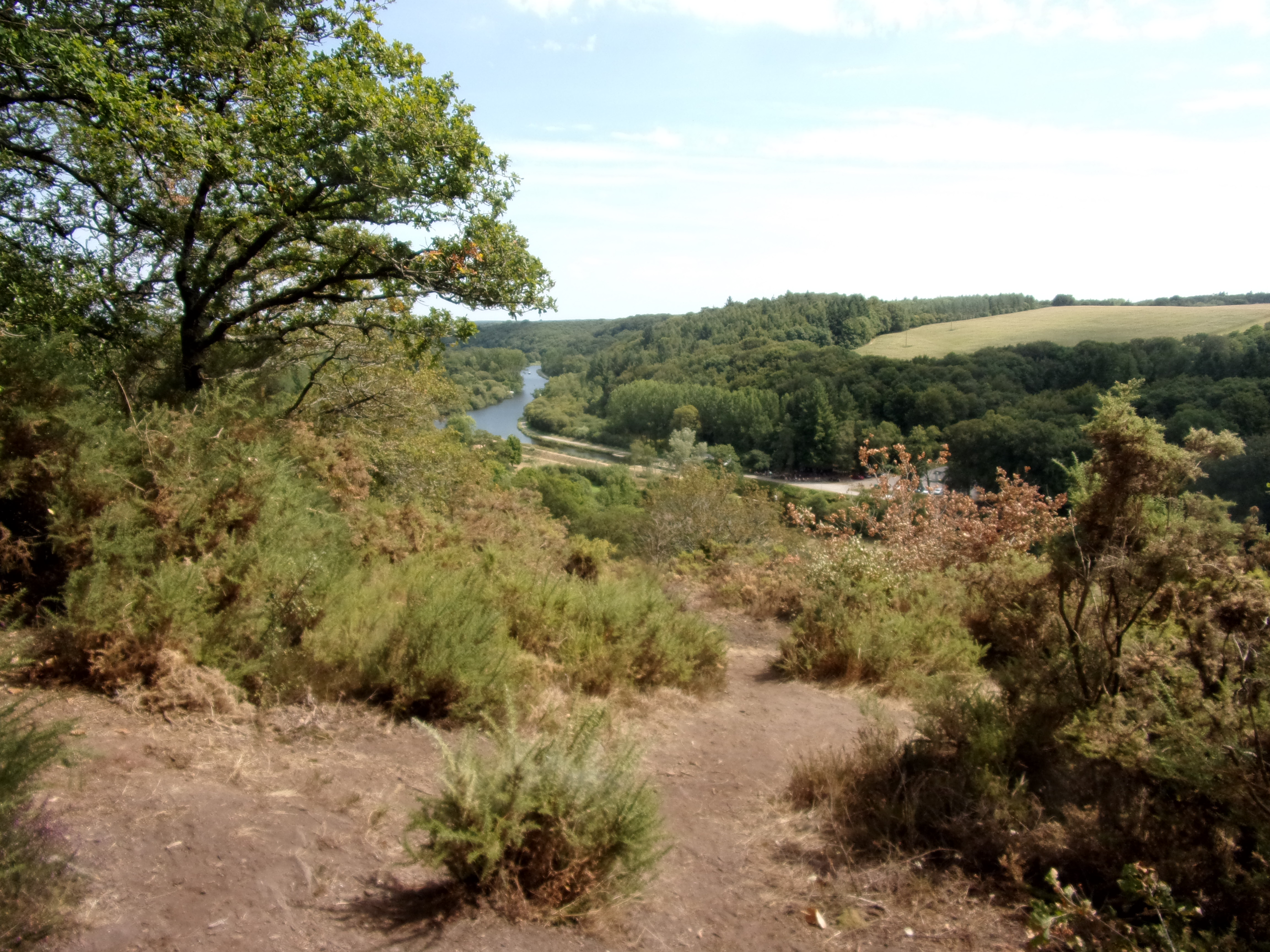
The Blavet valley in Quistinic

The village centre is located 25 km (16 mi) northeast of Lorient, 39 km (24 mi) northwest of Vannes and 110 km (68 mi) west of Rennes. Historically, Quistinic belongs to the Vannetais. The river Blavet forms the commune's eastern and southern borders. The neighborhood of the hamlet of Poul Fetan, in Quistinic, offers a nice view over the Blavet valley. Quistinic is characterised by a bocage landscape.

=== Neighboring communes ===
Quistinic is border by Bubry and Melrand to the north, by Saint-Barthélemy and Baud to the east, by Languidic to the south and by Lanvaudan to the west.

== Map ==
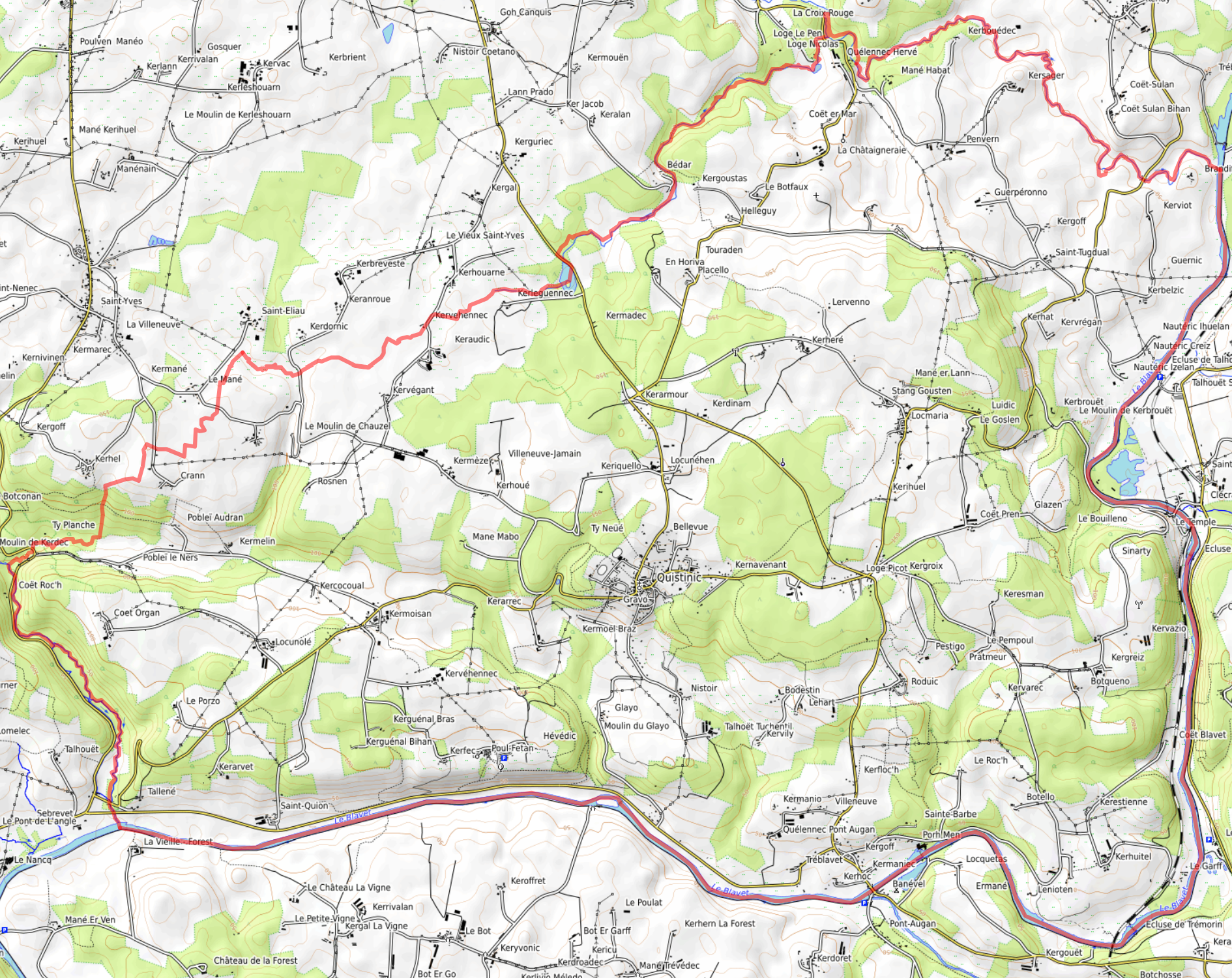
Topographic map

== Village of Poul-Fétan ==
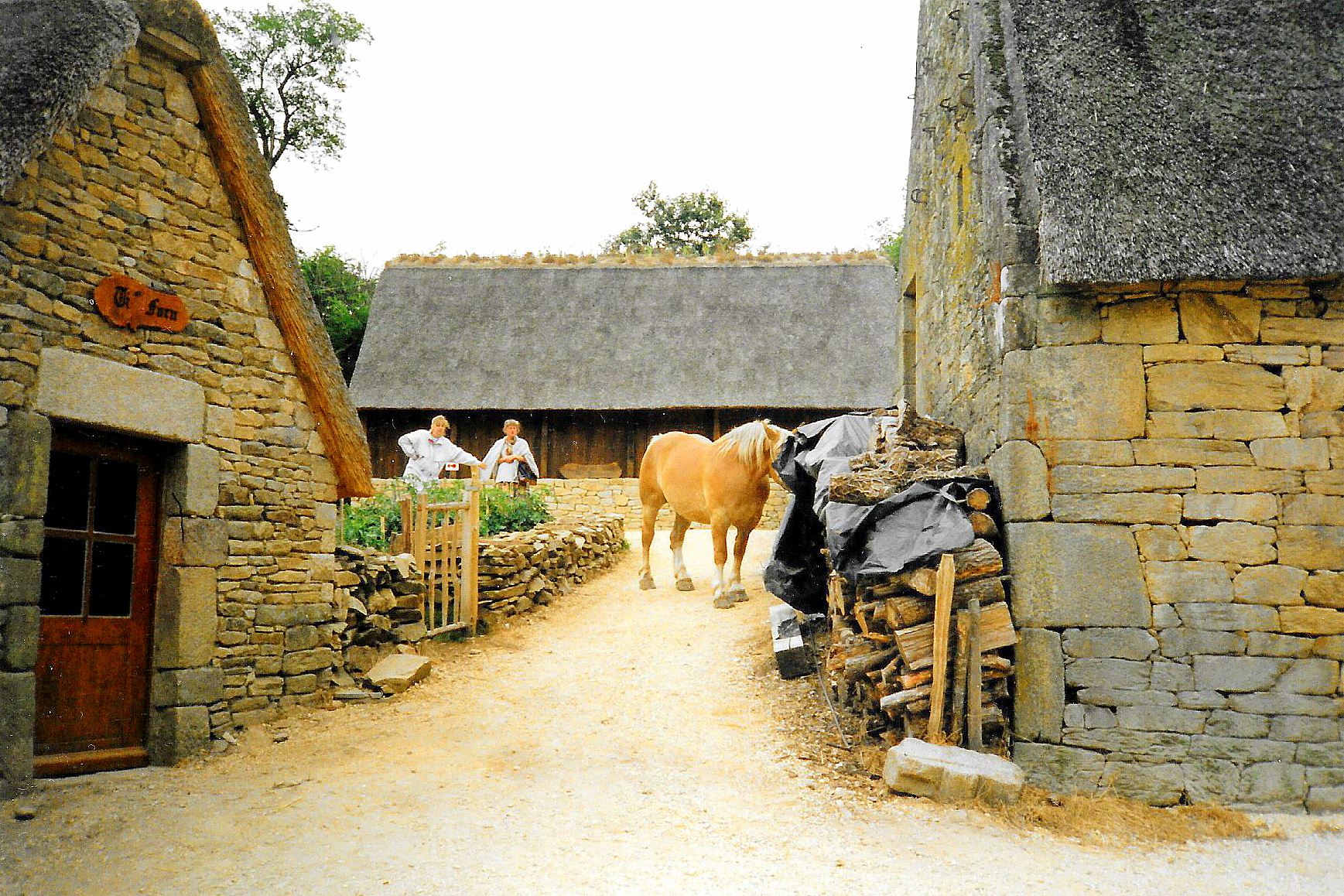
Poul-Fétan in August 1994

Poul-Fétan which etymologically means "Lavoir (wash-house) of the fountain" (French: Lavoir de la fontaine) is an historical center that is located within Quistinic. This hamlet, originating in the sixteenth century, has been completely restored with traditional materials. The houses are covered with thatching, and the old lavoir and the ancient hemp rusting containers are present. Visitors can notably enter the Longère located in a farmhouse and witness an interior of the early twentieth century reconstituted and observe the craftsmen at work showing their expertise.

== Gallery ==
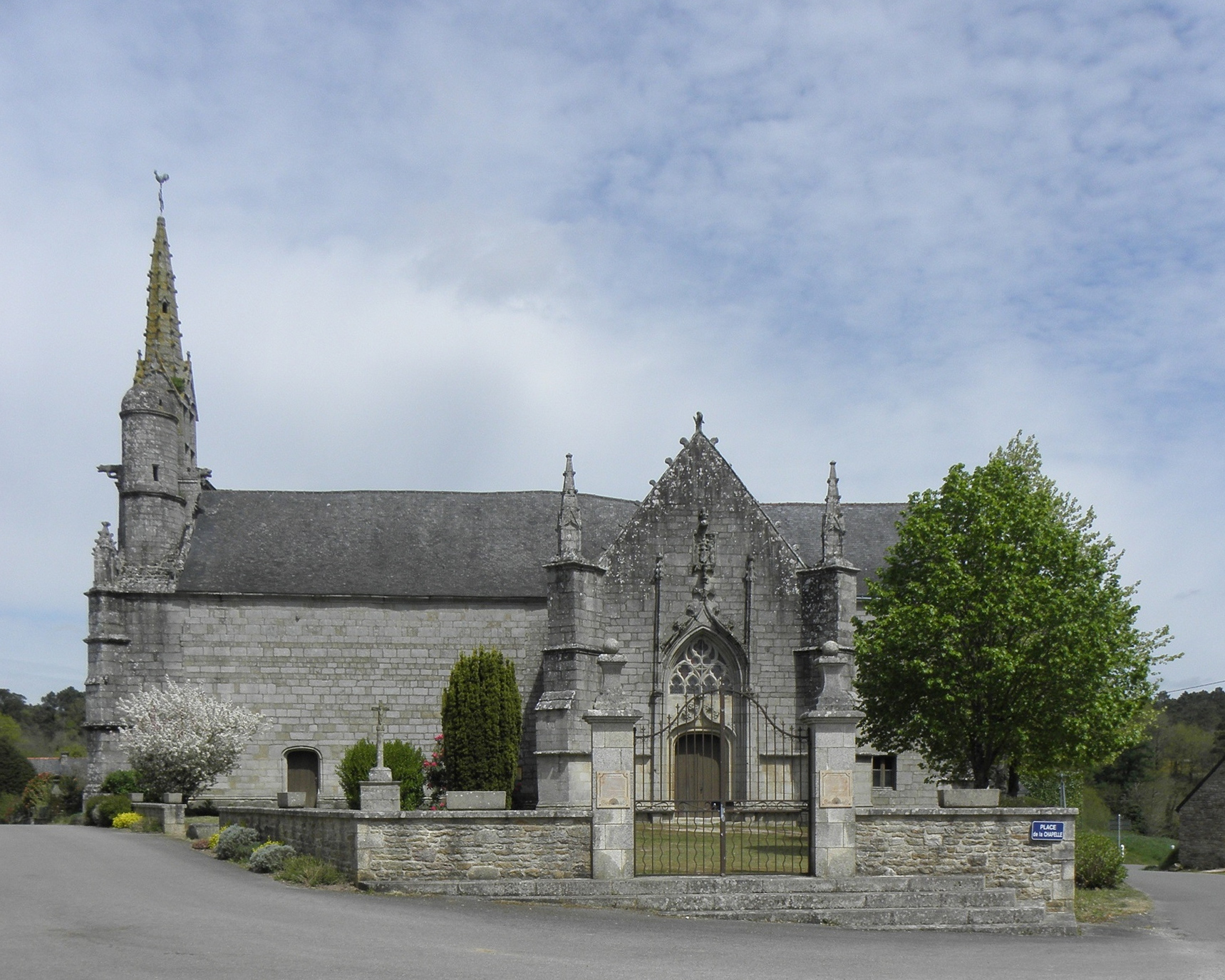
Chapel of Locmaria

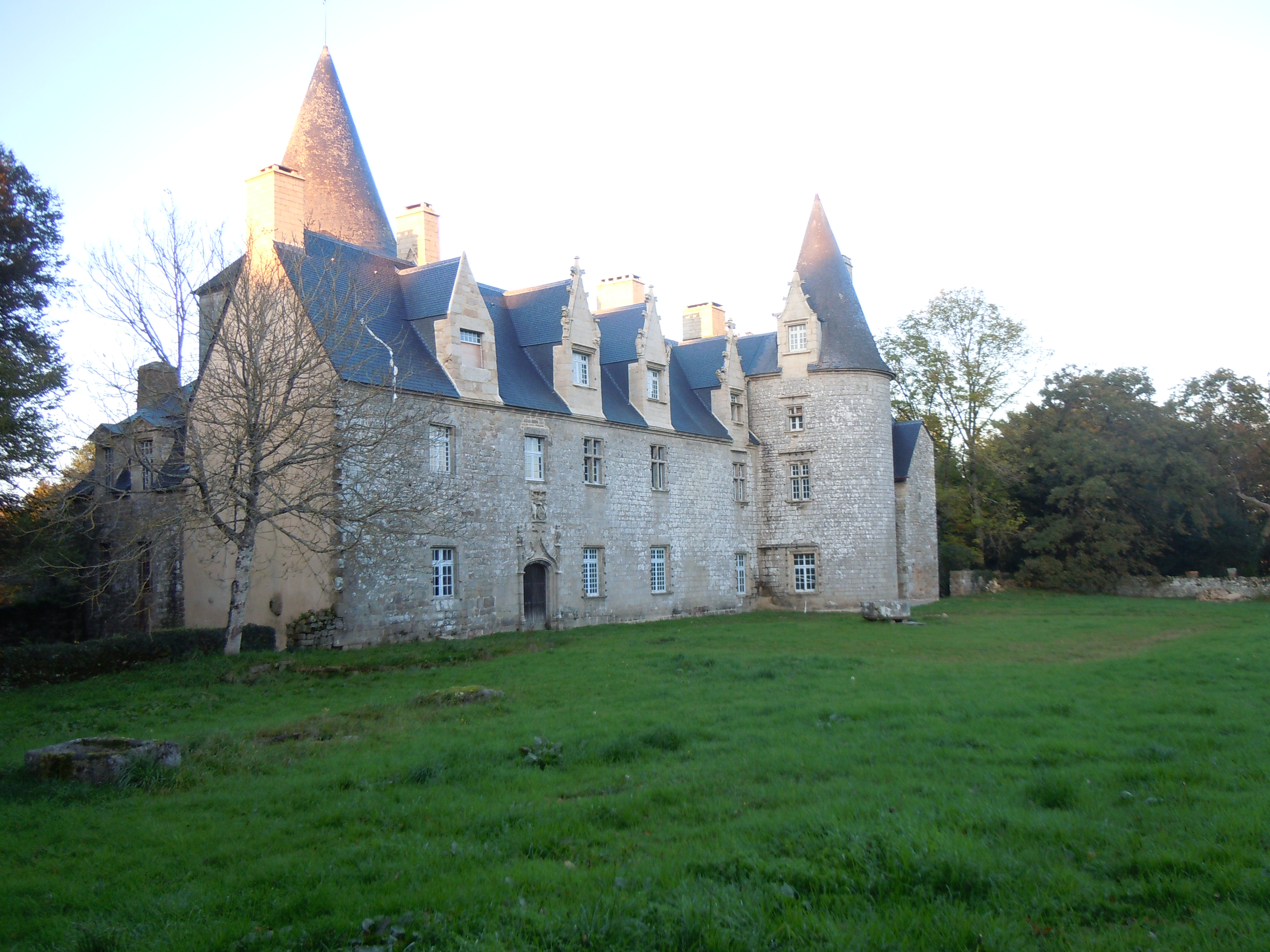
Villeneuve-Jacquelot castle

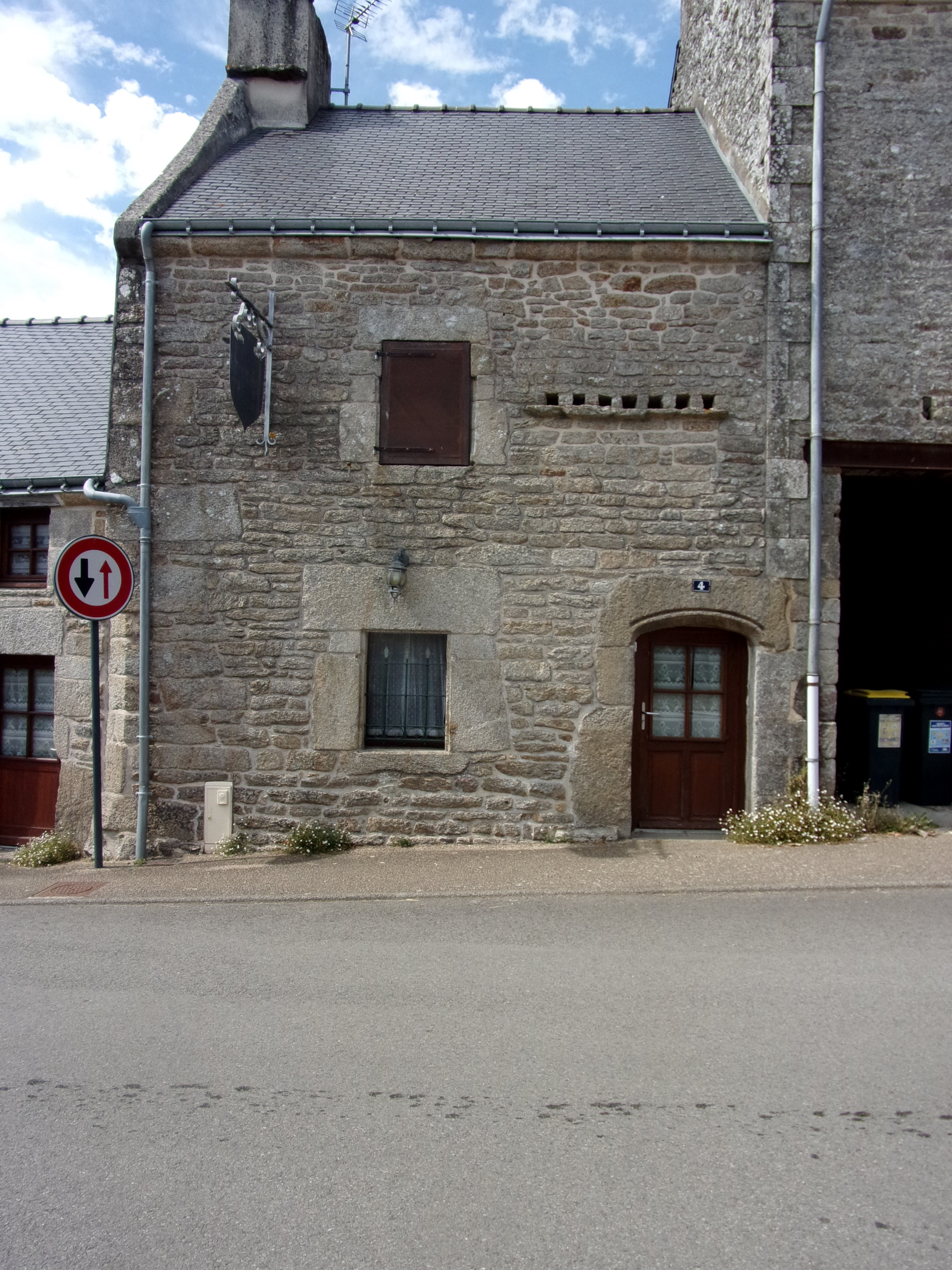
Old house in the village centre

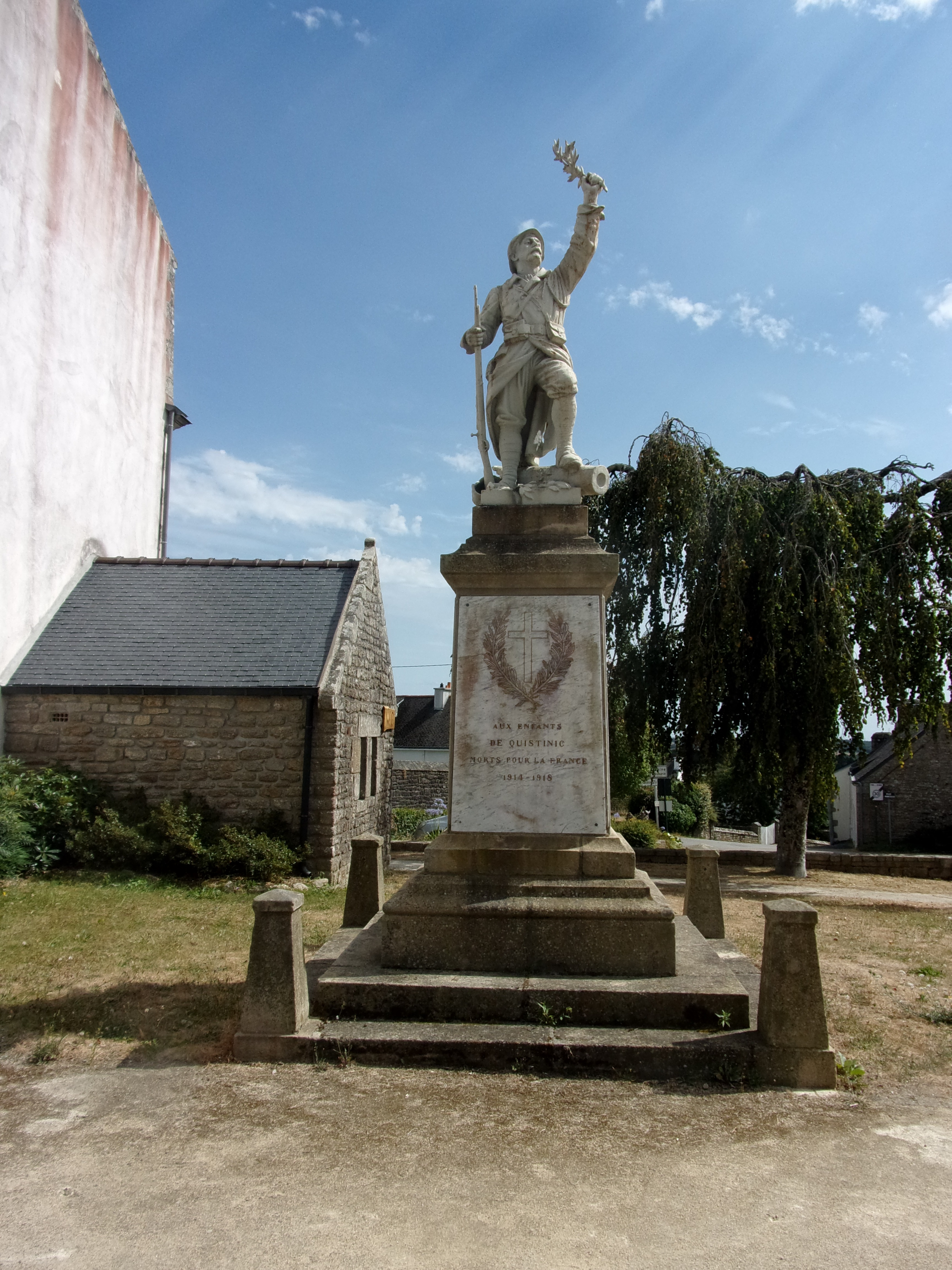
Monument erected in memory of the victims of the twentieth century wars.

== See also ==
- Communes of the Morbihan department
