= Melrand =

Commune in Brittany, France

Melrand Mêlrant
- Commune
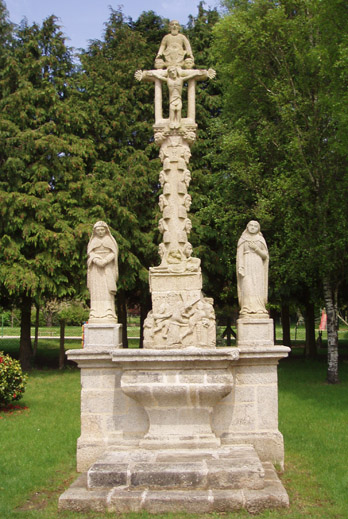
- The Calvary of Melrand, on the road to Guémené-sur-Scorff

- Coat of arms
- Location of Melrand
- Location within France Location within Brittany
- Coordinates: 47°58′52″N 3°06′37″W
- Country: France
- Region: Brittany
- Department: Morbihan
- Arrondissement: Pontivy
- Canton: Pontivy
- Intercommunality: Baud Communauté

Government
  - Mayor (2026–32): Murielle Nicol
- Area^{1}: 40.39 km^{2} (15.59 sq mi)
- Highest elevation: 161 m (528 ft)
- Lowest elevation: 32 m (105 ft)
- Population (2023): 1,598
  - Density: 39.56/km^{2} (102.5/sq mi)
- Time zone: UTC+01:00 (CET)
  - Summer (DST): UTC+02:00 (CEST)
- INSEE/Postal code: 56128 /56310
- ^{1} French Land Register data, which excludes lakes, ponds, glaciers > 1 km^{2} (0.386 sq mi or 247 acres) and river estuaries.

Melrand (French pronunciation: [mɛlʁɑ̃]; Breton: Mêlrant) is a commune in the Morbihan department of Brittany in north-western France.

== Population ==
Inhabitants of Melrand are called in French Melrandais. Melrand's population peaked at 3,712 in 1921 and declined to 1,598 in 2023. This represents a 57% decrease in total population since the peak census figure.

Historical population

Year	Pop.	±% p.a.
1793	2,635	—
1800	2,714	+0.42%
1806	2,242	−3.13%
1821	2,761	+1.40%
1831	2,887	+0.45%
1836	2,907	+0.14%
1841	2,705	−1.43%
1846	3,109	+2.82%
1851	3,128	+0.12%
1856	3,053	−0.48%
1861	3,040	−0.09%
1866	3,212	+1.11%
1872	3,032	−0.96%
1876	3,161	+1.05%
1881	3,241	+0.50%
1886	3,295	+0.33%
1891	3,421	+0.75%
1896	3,535	+0.66%
1901	3,600	+0.37%

Year	Pop.	±% p.a.
1906	3,570	−0.17%
1911	3,666	+0.53%
1921	3,712	+0.12%
1926	3,658	−0.29%
1931	3,637	−0.12%
1936	3,526	−0.62%
1946	3,005	−1.59%
1954	2,575	−1.91%
1962	2,149	−2.24%
1968	2,031	−0.94%
1975	1,883	−1.08%
1982	1,771	−0.87%
1990	1,584	−1.39%
1999	1,525	−0.42%
2007	1,509	−0.13%
2012	1,503	−0.08%
2017	1,516	+0.17%
2023	1,598	+0.88%

Source: EHESS and INSEE (1968–2023)

== Geography ==
The village centre is located 14 km (8.7 mi) southwest of Pontivy and 32 km (20 mi) northeast of Lorient. Historically, the village belongs to the Vannetais. The Blavet river forms the eastern border of the commune. The Sarre river, a tributary of the Blavet river, flows through Melrand.

=== Neighbouring communes ===
Melrand is border by Bubry to the west, by Guern to the north, by Pluméliau-Bieuzy to the east and by Quistinic to the south.

== Map ==
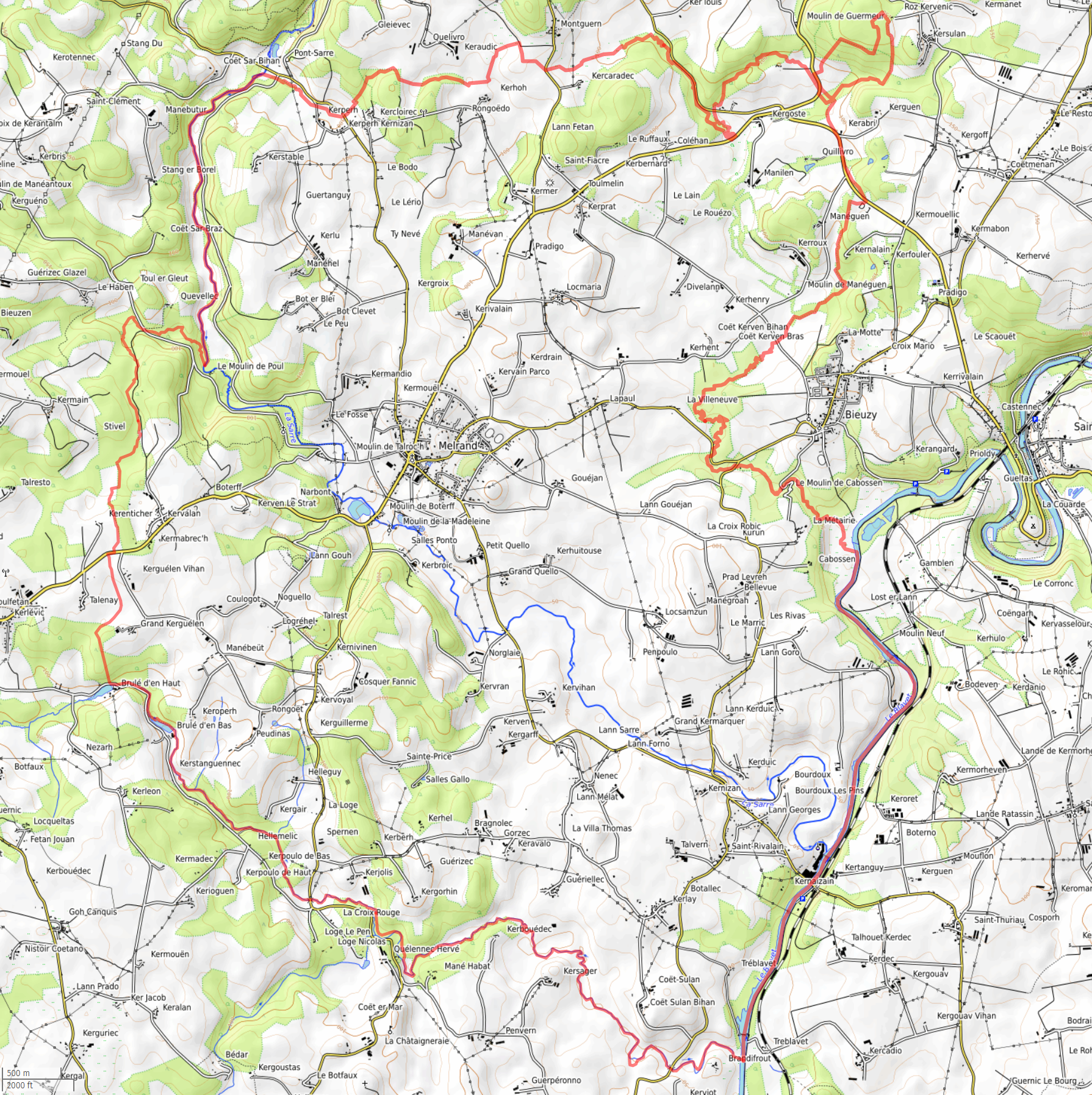
Topographic map

== Breton language ==
In 2008, 31.4% of children in the commune attended schools taught in Breton and French for their primary education.

== History ==
In September 1592, the Spanish mercenaries in the service of the Duke of Mercœur plundered all the neighboring parishes of Guémené, including Melrand.

== See also ==
- Communes of the Morbihan department
