= Cléguer =

Commune in Brittany, France

Cléguer Kleger
- Commune
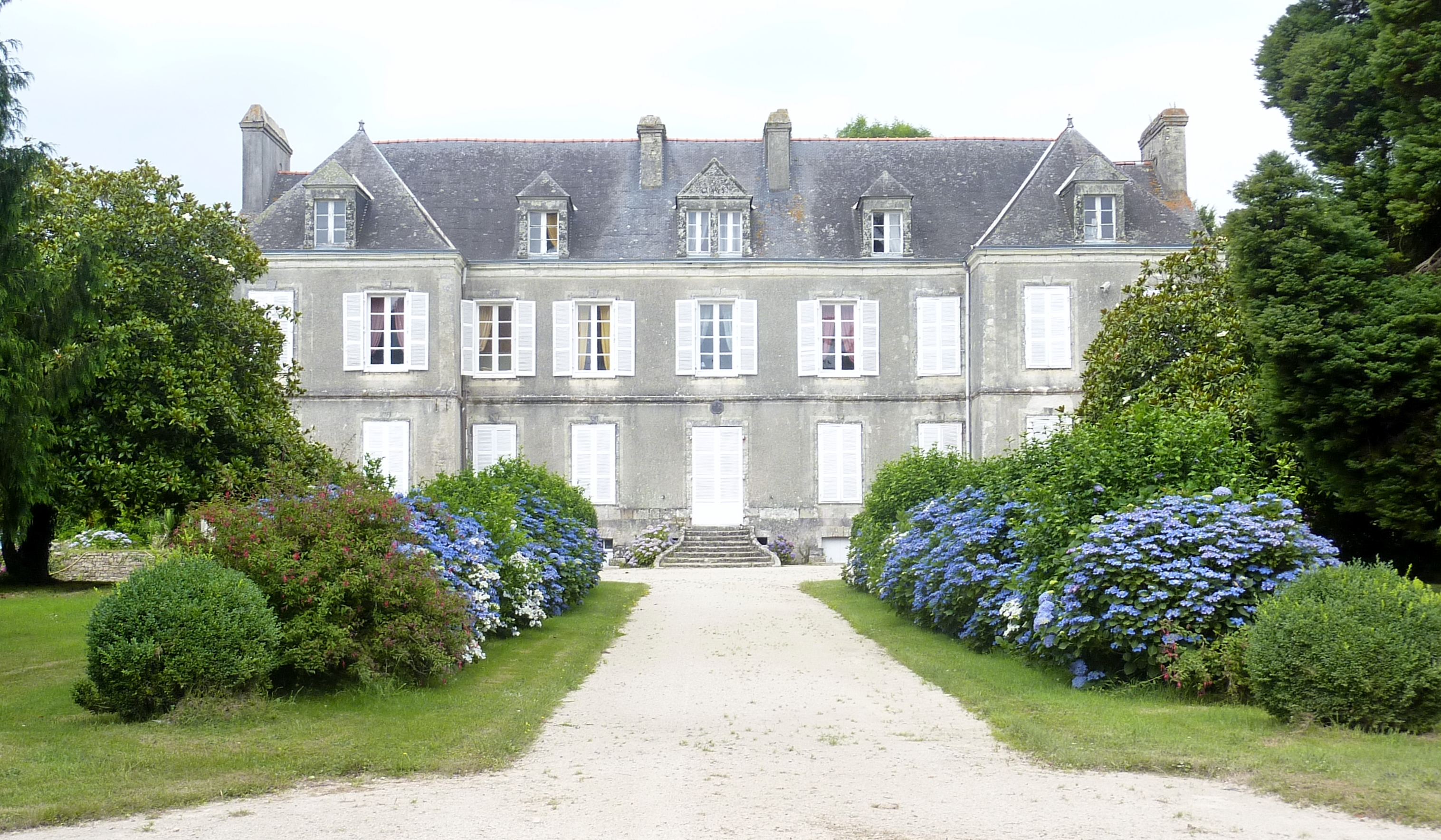
- Château de Meslien.
- Location of Cléguer
- Location within France Location within Brittany
- Coordinates: 47°51′18″N 3°22′58″W
- Country: France
- Region: Brittany
- Department: Morbihan
- Arrondissement: Lorient
- Canton: Guidel
- Intercommunality: Lorient Agglomération

Government
  - Mayor (2026–32): Bernard Le Diagon
- Area^{1}: 32.15 km^{2} (12.41 sq mi)
- Highest elevation: 107 m (351 ft)
- Lowest elevation: 2 m (6.6 ft)
- Population (2023): 3,460
  - Density: 108/km^{2} (279/sq mi)
- Time zone: UTC+01:00 (CET)
  - Summer (DST): UTC+02:00 (CEST)
- INSEE/Postal code: 56040 /56620
- ^{1} French Land Register data, which excludes lakes, ponds, glaciers > 1 km^{2} (0.386 sq mi or 247 acres) and river estuaries.

Cléguer (French pronunciation: [klegɛʁ]; Breton: Kleger) is a commune in the Morbihan department of Brittany in north-western France.

== Population ==
Historical population
Year	Pop.	±% p.a.
1968	1,798	—
1975	1,922	+0.96%
1982	2,946	+6.29%
1990	3,009	+0.26%
1999	3,061	+0.19%
2007	3,305	+0.96%
2012	3,291	−0.08%
2017	3,323	+0.19%
2023	3,460	+0.68%
Source: INSEE

Inhabitants of Cléguer are called in French Cléguerois.

== Geography ==
The town lies in the valley of the river Scorff. The river Scorff forms the commune's western border. The town centre is located 12 km (7.5 mi) north of Lorient. Historically, Cléguer belongs to Vannetais.

== Map ==
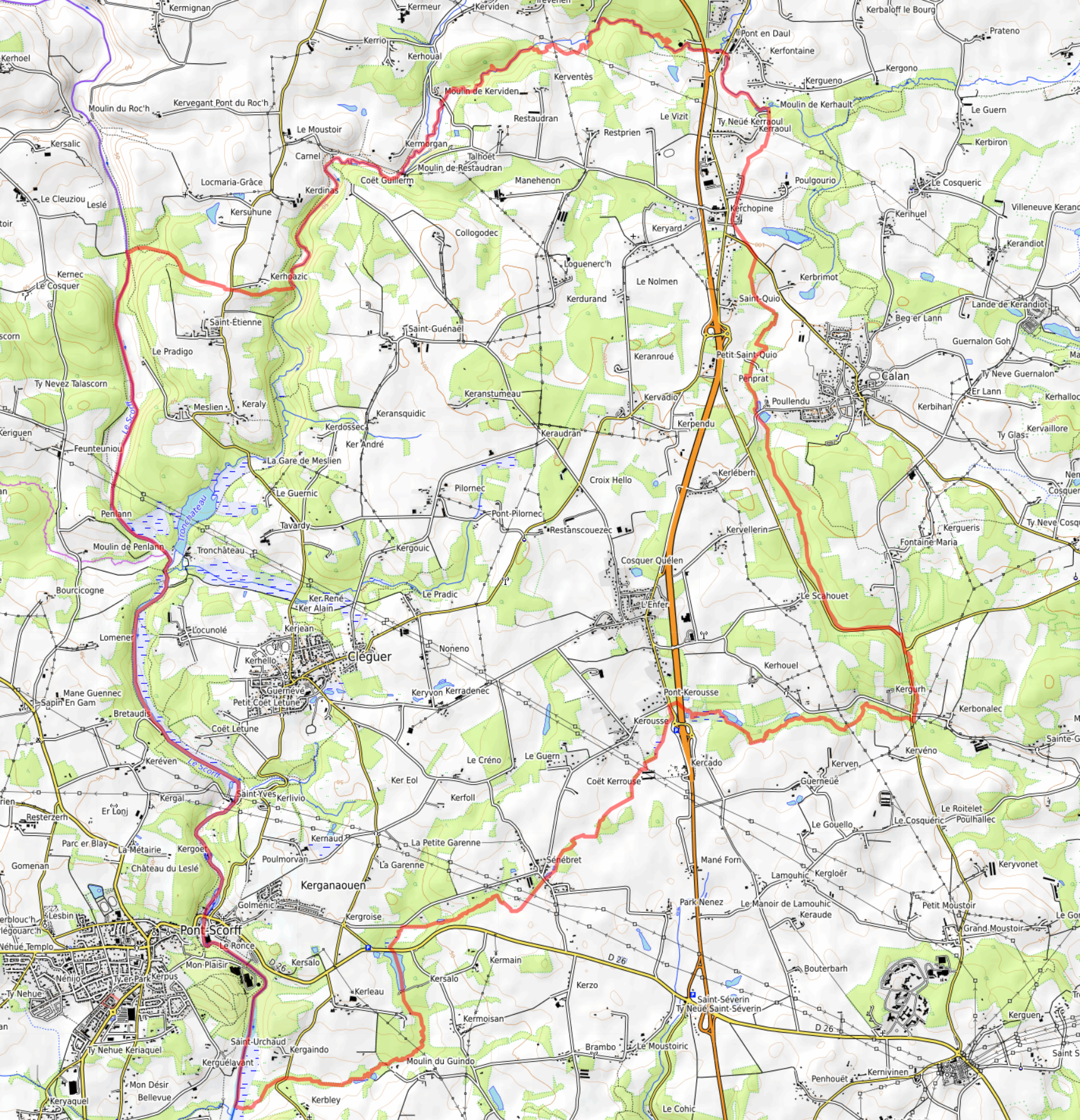
Topographic map

== See also ==
- Communes of the Morbihan department
