= Gestel, Morbihan =

Commune in Brittany, France

Gestel Yestael
- Commune
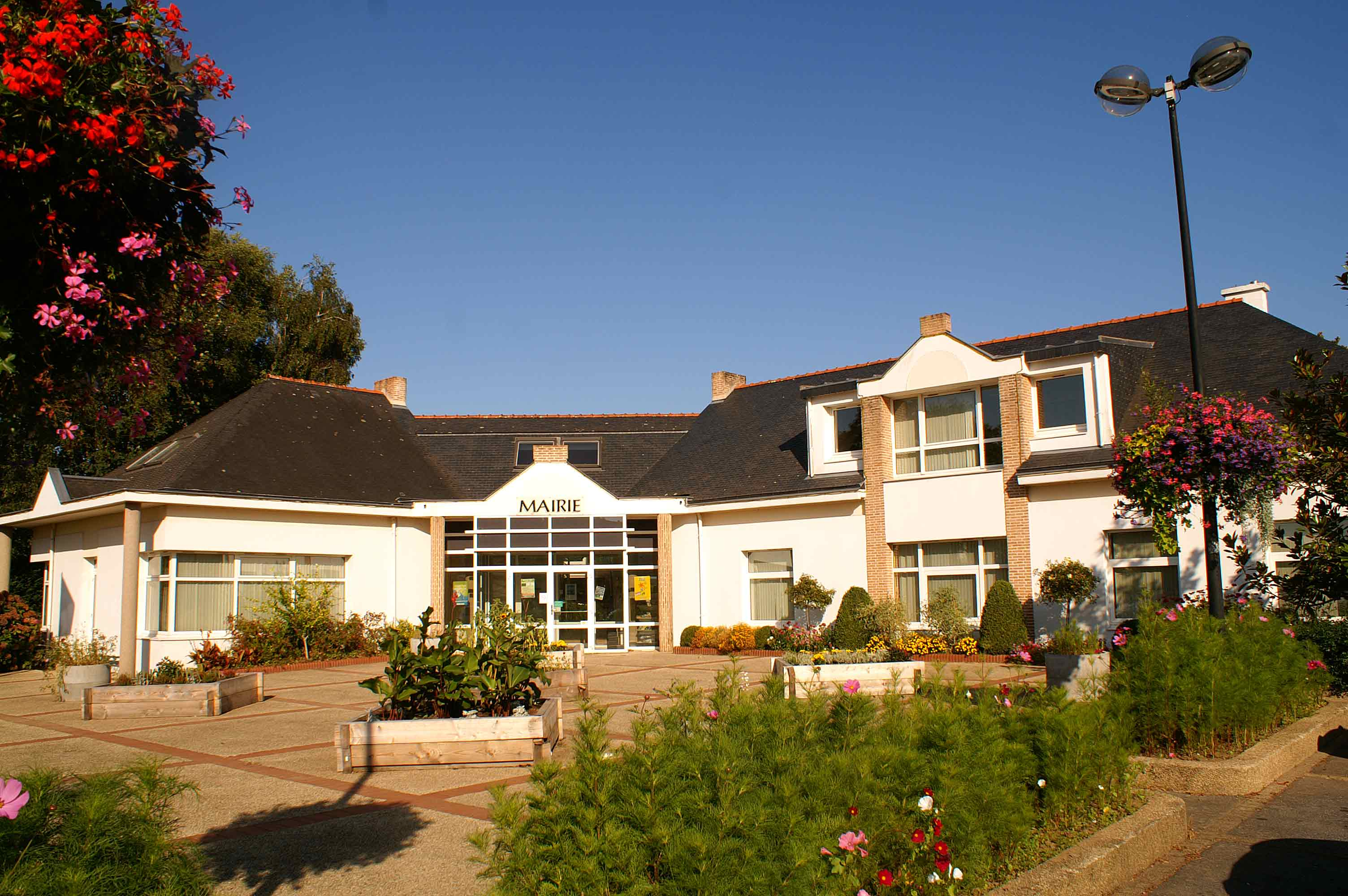
- The town hall in Gestel
- Location of Gestel
- Location within France Location within Brittany
- Coordinates: 47°48′14″N 3°26′35″W
- Country: France
- Region: Brittany
- Department: Morbihan
- Arrondissement: Lorient
- Canton: Guidel
- Intercommunality: Lorient Agglomération

Government
  - Mayor (2026–32): Françoise Merret
- Area^{1}: 6.25 km^{2} (2.41 sq mi)
- Highest elevation: 66 m (217 ft)
- Lowest elevation: 13 m (43 ft)
- Population (2023): 2,601
  - Density: 416/km^{2} (1,080/sq mi)
- Time zone: UTC+01:00 (CET)
  - Summer (DST): UTC+02:00 (CEST)
- INSEE/Postal code: 56063 /56530
- ^{1} French Land Register data, which excludes lakes, ponds, glaciers > 1 km^{2} (0.386 sq mi or 247 acres) and river estuaries.

Gestel (French pronunciation: [ʒɛstɛl]; Breton: Yestael) is a commune in the Morbihan department of Brittany in north-western France. Gestel station has rail connections to Quimper, Lorient and Vannes.

== Population ==
Historical population
Year	Pop.	±% p.a.
1968	525	—
1975	758	+5.39%
1982	1,566	+10.92%
1990	1,921	+2.59%
1999	2,227	+1.66%
2007	2,552	+1.72%
2012	2,675	+0.95%
2017	2,684	+0.07%
2023	2,601	−0.52%
Source: INSEE

Inhabitants of Gestel are called in French Gestélois.

== See also ==
- Communes of the Morbihan department
