= Calan, Morbihan =

Commune in Brittany, France

Calan Kalann
- Commune
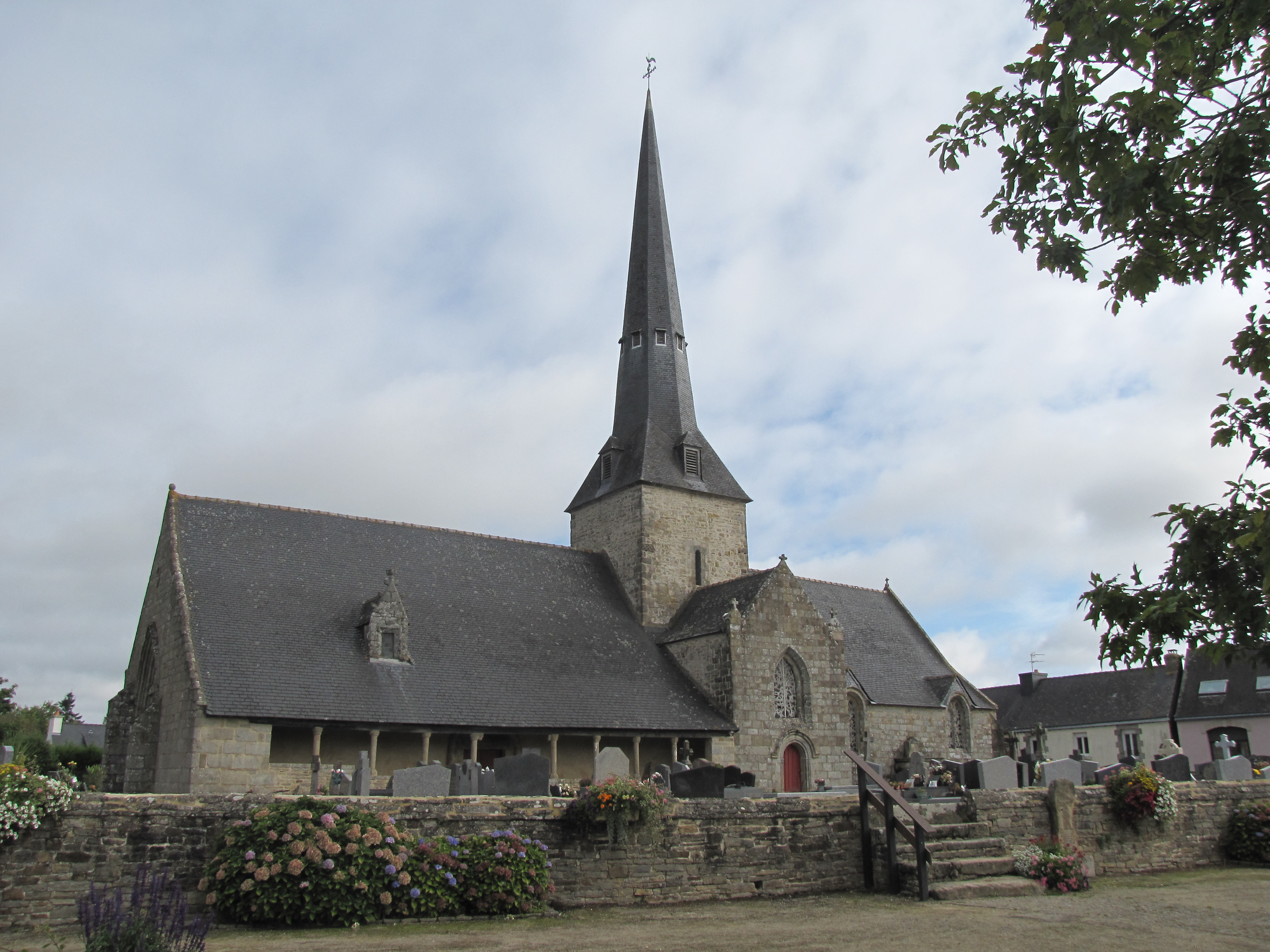
- The church of the Trinity, in Calan

- Coat of arms
- Location of Calan
- Location within France Location within Brittany
- Coordinates: 47°52′36″N 3°19′15″W
- Country: France
- Region: Brittany
- Department: Morbihan
- Arrondissement: Lorient
- Canton: Guidel
- Intercommunality: Lorient Agglomération

Government
  - Mayor (2026–32): Yann Guiguen
- Area^{1}: 12.29 km^{2} (4.75 sq mi)
- Highest elevation: 114 m (374 ft)
- Lowest elevation: 57 m (187 ft)
- Population (2023): 1,277
  - Density: 103.9/km^{2} (269.1/sq mi)
- Time zone: UTC+01:00 (CET)
  - Summer (DST): UTC+02:00 (CEST)
- INSEE/Postal code: 56029 /56240
- ^{1} French Land Register data, which excludes lakes, ponds, glaciers > 1 km^{2} (0.386 sq mi or 247 acres) and river estuaries.

Calan (French pronunciation: [kalɑ̃]; Breton: Kalann) is a small town in the commune in the Morbihan department of the region of Brittany in north-western France.

== Demographics ==
Inhabitants of Calan are called Calanais.

== See also ==
- Communes of the Morbihan department
