= Pont-Scorff =

Pont-Scorff Paou-Skorn
- Commune
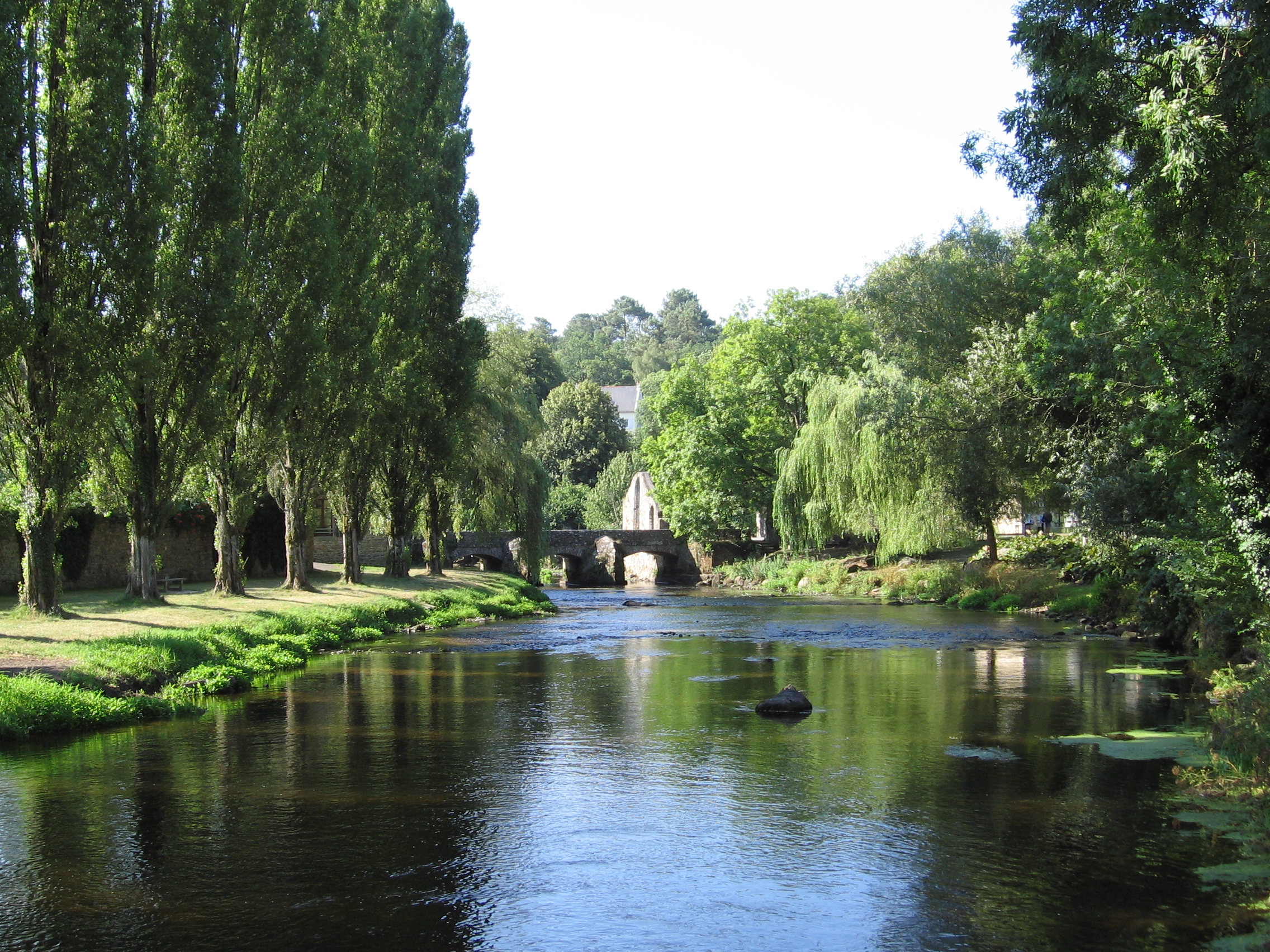
- The Scorff in Pont-Scorff

- Coat of arms
- Location of Pont-Scorff
- Location within France Location within Brittany
- Coordinates: 47°50′06″N 3°24′07″W
- Country: France
- Region: Brittany
- Department: Morbihan
- Arrondissement: Lorient
- Canton: Guidel
- Intercommunality: Lorient Agglomération

Government
  - Mayor (2026–32): Yvonnick Le Coupannec
- Area^{1}: 23.50 km^{2} (9.07 sq mi)
- Highest elevation: 72 m (236 ft)
- Lowest elevation: 2 m (6.6 ft)
- Population (2023): 4,037
  - Density: 171.8/km^{2} (444.9/sq mi)
- Time zone: UTC+01:00 (CET)
  - Summer (DST): UTC+02:00 (CEST)
- INSEE/Postal code: 56179 /56620
- ^{1} French Land Register data, which excludes lakes, ponds, glaciers > 1 km^{2} (0.386 sq mi or 247 acres) and river estuaries.

Pont-Scorff (French pronunciation: [pɔ̃ skɔʁf]; Breton: Pont-Skorf) is a commune in the Morbihan department of Brittany in north-western France. It takes its name from the river Scorff, which flows through the town.

== Geography ==
The town lies in the valley of the river Scorff. Historically, it belongs to Vannetais. The town is located 10 km (6.2 mi) north of Lorient.

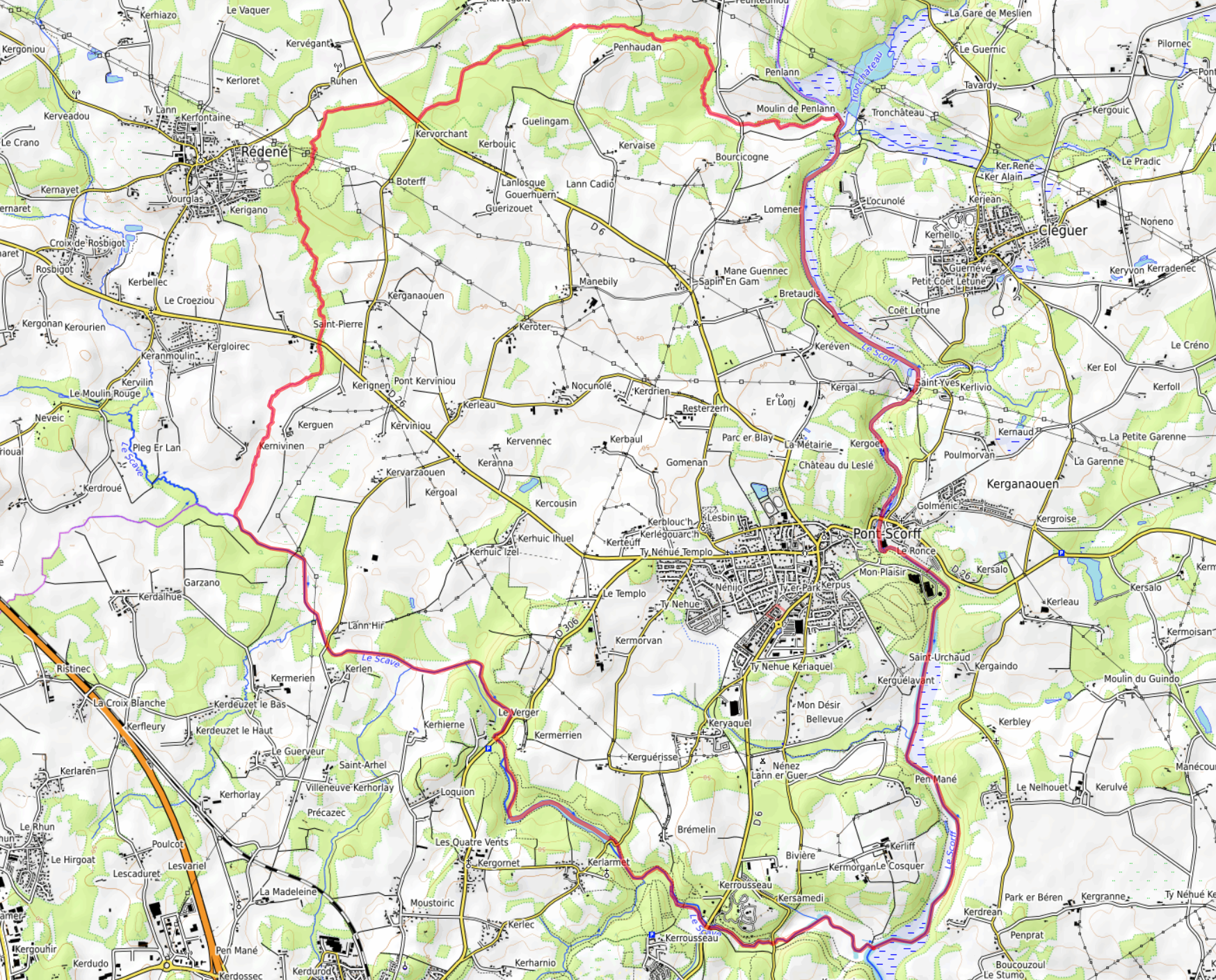
Topographic map

== Population ==
Historical population
Year	Pop.	±% p.a.
1968	1,704	—
1975	1,758	+0.45%
1982	2,295	+3.88%
1990	2,312	+0.09%
1999	2,623	+1.41%
2007	3,087	+2.06%
2012	3,407	+1.99%
2017	3,744	+1.90%
2023	4,037	+1.26%
Source: INSEE

Inhabitants of Pont-Scorff are called in French Scorvipontains or Scorffipontais.

== Breton language ==
The municipality launched a linguistic plan through Ya d'ar brezhoneg on 22 February 2008.

In 2008, 8.74% of children attended the bilingual schools in primary education.

== See also ==
- Communes of the Morbihan department
- Gaston-Auguste Schweitzer Sculptor statue of Fernand de Langle de Cary
