= Inzinzac-Lochrist =

Commune in Brittany, France

Inzinzac-Lochrist Zinzag-Lokrist
- Commune
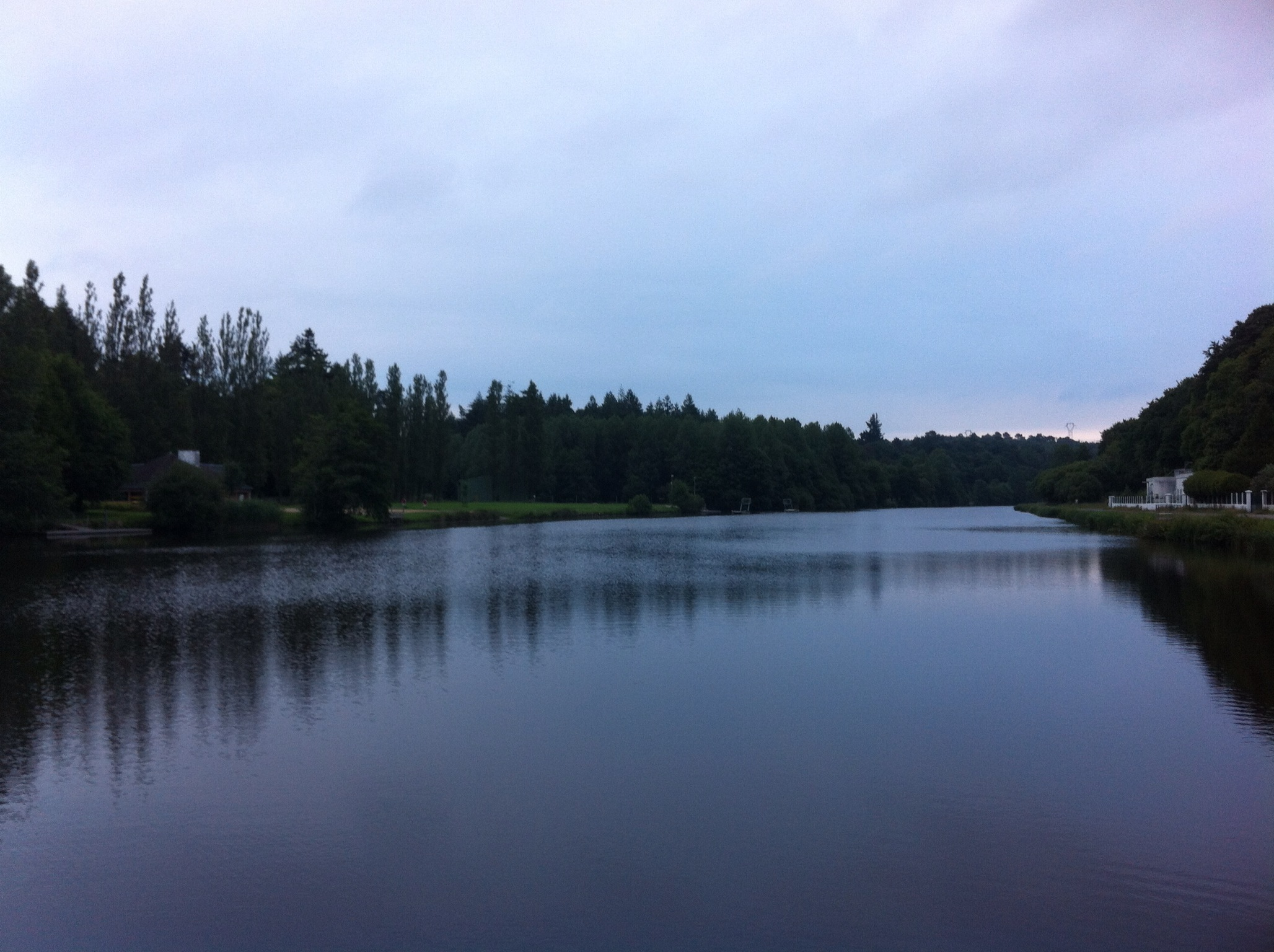
- The Blavet

- Coat of arms
- Location of Inzinzac-Lochrist
- Location within France Location within Brittany
- Coordinates: 47°50′40″N 3°15′57″W
- Country: France
- Region: Brittany
- Department: Morbihan
- Arrondissement: Lorient
- Canton: Guidel
- Intercommunality: Lorient Agglomération

Government
  - Mayor (2026–32): Jérôme Meunier
- Area^{1}: 44.67 km^{2} (17.25 sq mi)
- Highest elevation: 111 m (364 ft)
- Lowest elevation: 2 m (6.6 ft)
- Population (2023): 6,691
  - Density: 149.8/km^{2} (387.9/sq mi)
- Time zone: UTC+01:00 (CET)
  - Summer (DST): UTC+02:00 (CEST)
- INSEE/Postal code: 56090 /56650
- ^{1} French Land Register data, which excludes lakes, ponds, glaciers > 1 km^{2} (0.386 sq mi or 247 acres) and river estuaries.

Inzinzac-Lochrist (Breton: Zinzag-Lokrist) is a commune in the Morbihan department of Brittany in north-western France.

== Demographics ==
Inhabitants of Inzinzac-Lochrist are called in French Inzinzacois or Lochristois.

Historical population
Year	Pop.	±% p.a.
1968	4,714	—
1975	5,069	+1.04%
1982	5,594	+1.42%
1990	5,541	−0.12%
1999	5,395	−0.30%
2007	5,650	+0.58%
2012	6,246	+2.03%
2017	6,526	+0.88%
2023	6,691	+0.42%
Source: INSEE

== Geography ==
The town has several urban centres : Inzinzac, Lochrist, Penquesten. The river Blavet forms a natural boundary to the east and to the south. The village of Inzinzac is located 13 km (8.1 mi) northeast of Lorient. Historically, Inzinzac-Lochrist belongs to Vannetais.

== Map ==
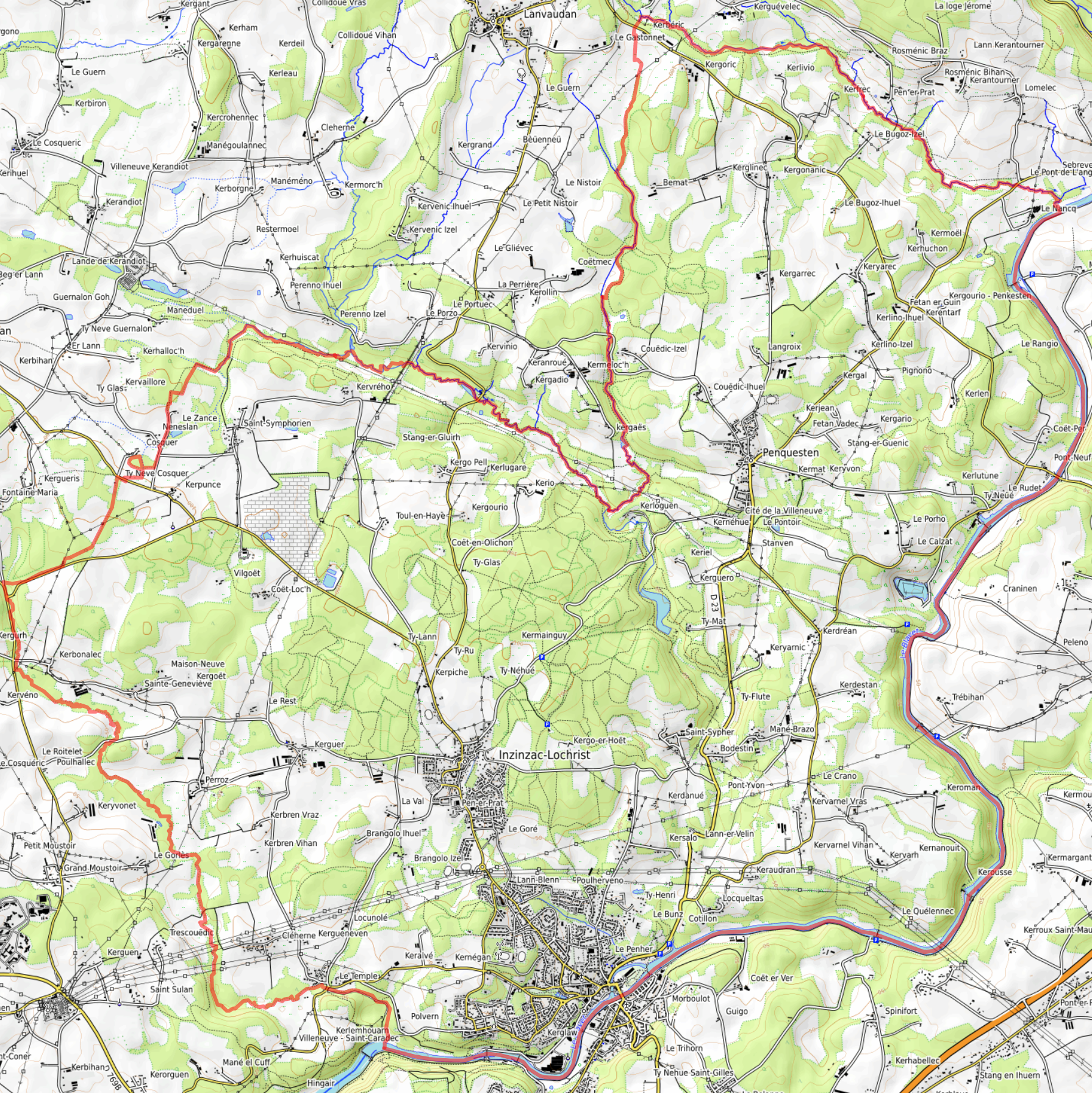
Topographic Map.

== See also ==
- Communes of the Morbihan department
