= Canton of Guidel =

Coordinates: 47.79°N 3.49°W

The canton of Guidel is an administrative division of the Morbihan department, northwestern France. It was created at the French canton reorganisation which came into effect in March 2015. Its seat is in Guidel.

It consists of the following communes:

1. Bubry
2. Calan
3. Cléguer
4. Gestel
5. Guidel
6. Inguiniel
7. Inzinzac-Lochrist
8. Lanvaudan
9. Plouay
10. Pont-Scorff
11. Quistinic
