= Lorient Agglomération =

Coordinates: 47.75°N 3.36°W

- Communauté d'agglomération
- Country: France
- Region: Brittany
- Department: Morbihan
- No. of communes: {{{nbcomm}}}
- Established: 2014
- Area: 738.7 km^{2} (285.2 sq mi)
- Population (2020): 205,765
  - Density: 278.6/km^{2} (721.4/sq mi)

Lorient Agglomération (Breton: An Oriant Tolpad-kêrioù) is the communauté d'agglomération, an intercommunal structure, centred on the city of Lorient. It is located in the Morbihan department, in the Brittany region, northwestern France. It was created in January 2014. Its area is 738.7 km^{2}. Its population was 205,765 in 2020, of which 57,412 were in Lorient proper.

== Composition ==
The communauté d'agglomération consists of the following 25 communes:

1. Brandérion
2. Bubry
3. Calan
4. Caudan
5. Cléguer
6. Gâvres
7. Gestel
8. Groix
9. Guidel
10. Hennebont
11. Inguiniel
12. Inzinzac-Lochrist
13. Lanester
14. Languidic
15. Lanvaudan
16. Larmor-Plage
17. Locmiquélic
18. Lorient
19. Ploemeur
20. Plouay
21. Pont-Scorff
22. Port-Louis
23. Quéven
24. Quistinic
25. Riantec

The areas and populations (as per INSEE estimates as at 1 January 2020) are as follows:

Name	Agglomeration	Area in km^{2}	Population 2020 estimate
Lorient	Lorient	14.48	57,412
Ploemeur	Lorient	39.72	18,537
Larmor-Plage	Lorient	7.27	8,277
Quéven	Lorient	23.93	8,816
Lanester	Lorient	18.37	22,940
Caudan	Lorient	42.63	7,091
Total	Lorient	149.40	123,073
Hennebont	Hennebont	18.57	15,873
Inzinzac-Lochrist	Hennebont	44.67	6,535
Total	Hennebont	63.24	22,408
Riantec	Riantec-Locmiquélic	14.06	5,806
Locmiquélic	Riantec-Locmiquélic	3.58	4,056
Port-Louis	Riantec-Locmiquélic	1.07	2,672
Total	Riantec-Locmiquélic	18.71	12,534
Guidel	Guidel	52.29	11,743
Languidic	Languidic	109.10	8,047
Plouay	Plouay	67.33	5,789
Pont-Scorff	Pont-Scorff	23.50	3,897
Cléguer		32.15	3,310
Gestel		6.25	2,609
Bubry		69.09	2,289
Groix (island)		14.82	2,256
Inguiniel		51.40	2,193
Brandérion		6.03	1,466
Quistinic		42.95	1,421
Calan		12.29	1,247
Lanvaudan		18.30	804
Gâvres		1.88	679
Totals		738.73	205,765
