= Lanvaudan =

Commune in Brittany, France

Lanvaudan Lanvodan
- Commune
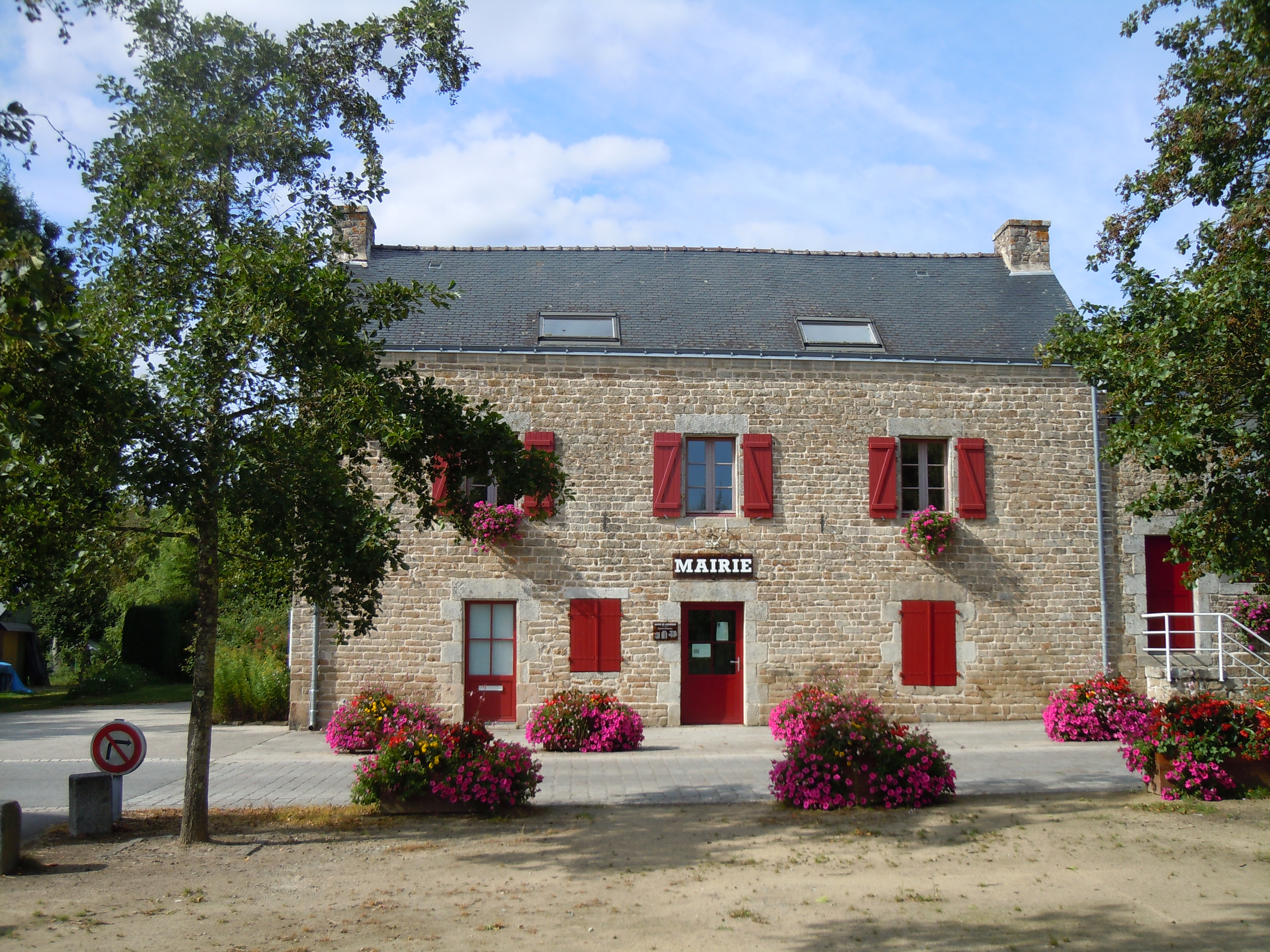
- The town hall in Lanvaudan
- Location of Lanvaudan
- Location within France Location within Brittany
- Coordinates: 47°54′01″N 3°15′37″W
- Country: France
- Region: Brittany
- Department: Morbihan
- Arrondissement: Lorient
- Canton: Guidel
- Intercommunality: Lorient Agglomération

Government
  - Mayor (2026–32): Patrick Le Caloch
- Area^{1}: 18.30 km^{2} (7.07 sq mi)
- Highest elevation: 158 m (518 ft)
- Lowest elevation: 19 m (62 ft)
- Population (2023): 808
  - Density: 44.2/km^{2} (114/sq mi)
- Time zone: UTC+01:00 (CET)
  - Summer (DST): UTC+02:00 (CEST)
- INSEE/Postal code: 56104 /56240
- ^{1} French Land Register data, which excludes lakes, ponds, glaciers > 1 km^{2} (0.386 sq mi or 247 acres) and river estuaries.

Lanvaudan (French pronunciation: [lɑ̃vodɑ̃]; Breton: Lanvodan) is a commune in the Morbihan department of Brittany in north-western France. Inhabitants of Lanvaudan are called in French Lanvaudanais.

== See also ==
- Communes of the Morbihan department
