= Guémené-sur-Scorff =

Commune in Brittany, France

Guémené-sur-Scorff Ar Gemene
- Commune
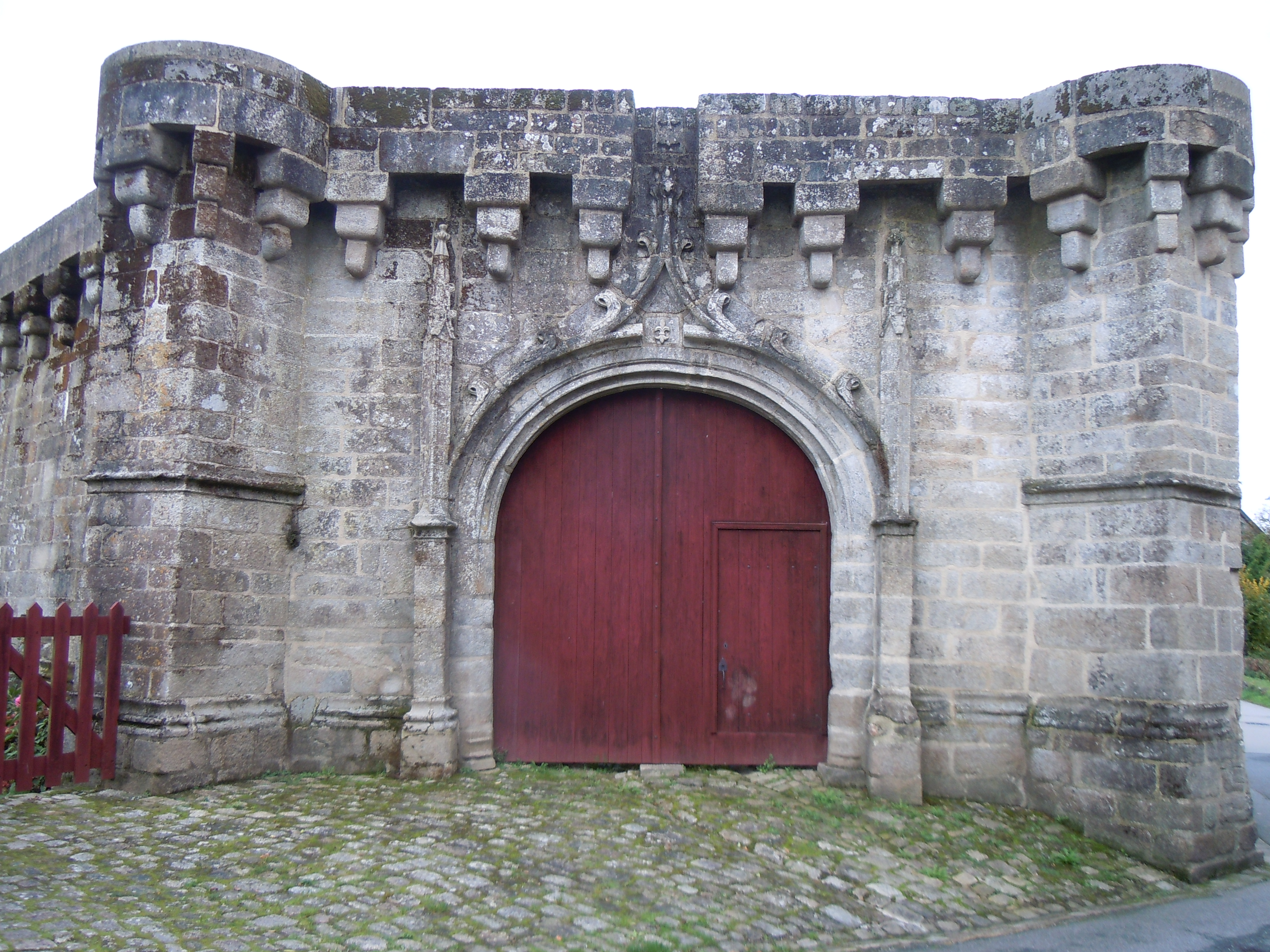
- The Porte des Rohans, in Guémené

- Coat of arms
- Location of Guémené-sur-Scorff
- Location within France Location within Brittany
- Coordinates: 48°04′09″N 3°12′06″W
- Country: France
- Region: Brittany
- Department: Morbihan
- Arrondissement: Pontivy
- Canton: Gourin
- Intercommunality: Roi Morvan Communauté

Government
  - Mayor (2026–32): Benoit Rivalan
- Area^{1}: 1.17 km^{2} (0.45 sq mi)
- Highest elevation: 180 m (590 ft)
- Lowest elevation: 118 m (387 ft)
- Population (2023): 1,175
  - Density: 1,000/km^{2} (2,600/sq mi)
- Time zone: UTC+01:00 (CET)
  - Summer (DST): UTC+02:00 (CEST)
- INSEE/Postal code: 56073 /56160
- ^{1} French Land Register data, which excludes lakes, ponds, glaciers > 1 km^{2} (0.386 sq mi or 247 acres) and river estuaries.

Guémené-sur-Scorff (French pronunciation: [gemne syʁ skɔʁf]; Breton: Ar Gemene) is a commune in the Morbihan department in Brittany in north-western France. Inhabitants of Guémené-sur-Scorff are called Guémenois.

== Geography ==
Guémené is situated on the Scorff river and is unusual in that it is a commune without any outlying land and it is bounded by the town boundaries only. It is located 20 km (12 mi) west of Pontivy.

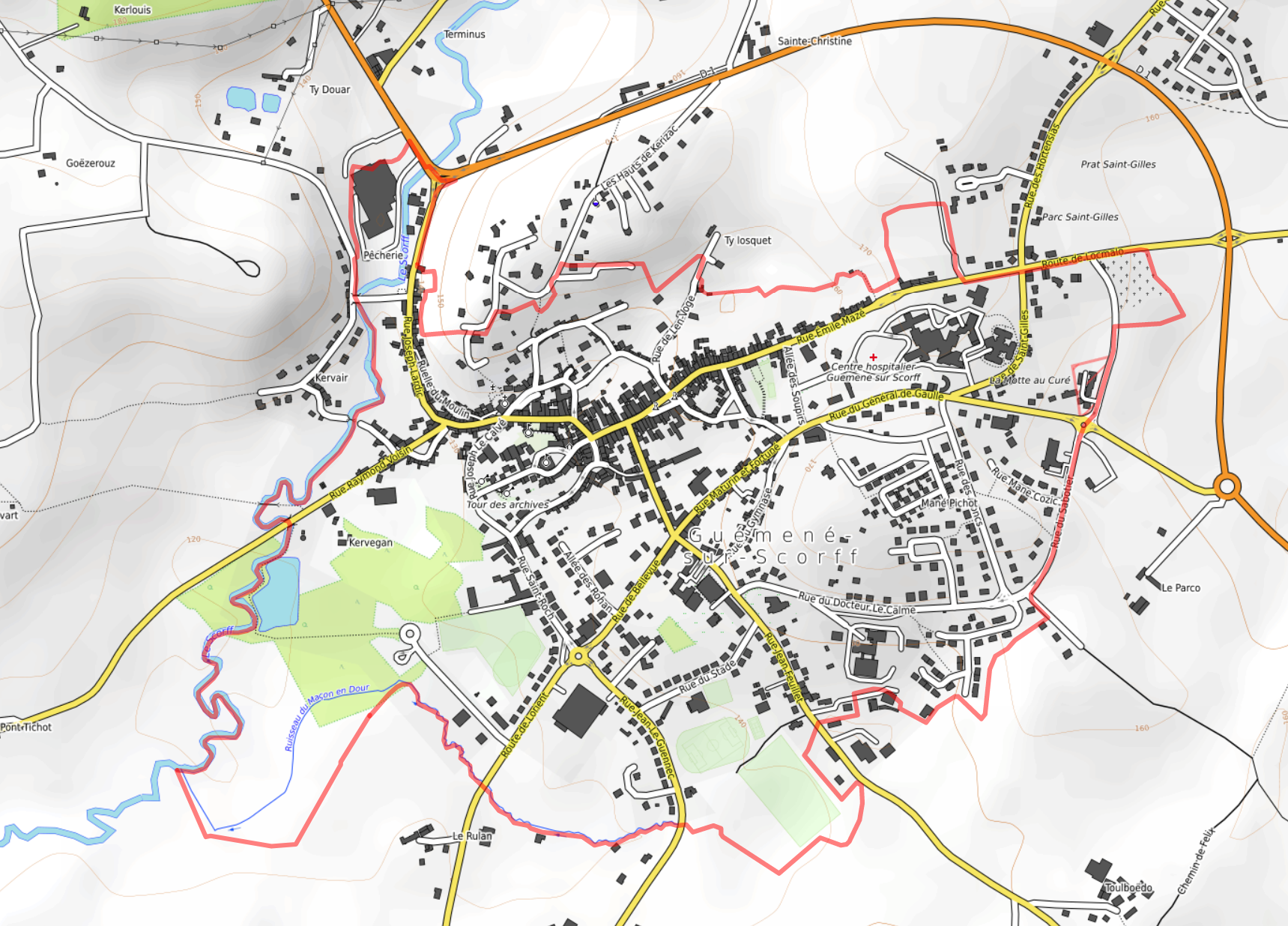
Topographic map

== Sights ==
The town is surrounded by wooded hillsides and was the seat of the Dukes of Rohan from the 13th to 15th century. The old castle was destroyed in the building of new houses and many townhouses contain parts of chimney breasts, turret stones and gateway posts. The most impressive sight is the 14th century Porterie - the entrance to what was the old castle.

An important market town, Guémené is valued for its ancient buildings that make up the town center and careful renovation of the same.

One of Brittany's oldest taverns, Les Trois Marchands, has been serving customers since the mid 17th century.

== Gallery ==
=== Old houses ===
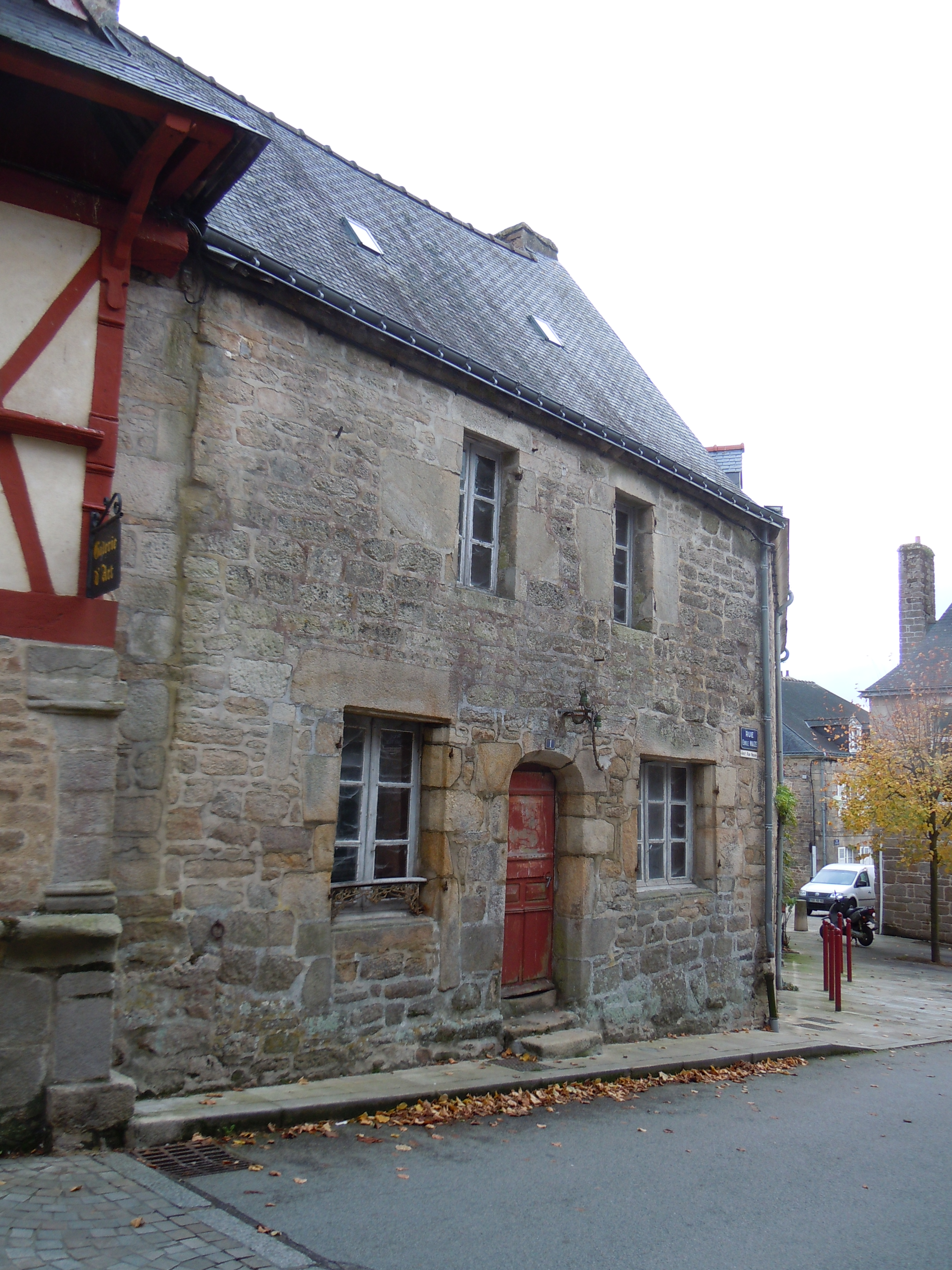
Old house.

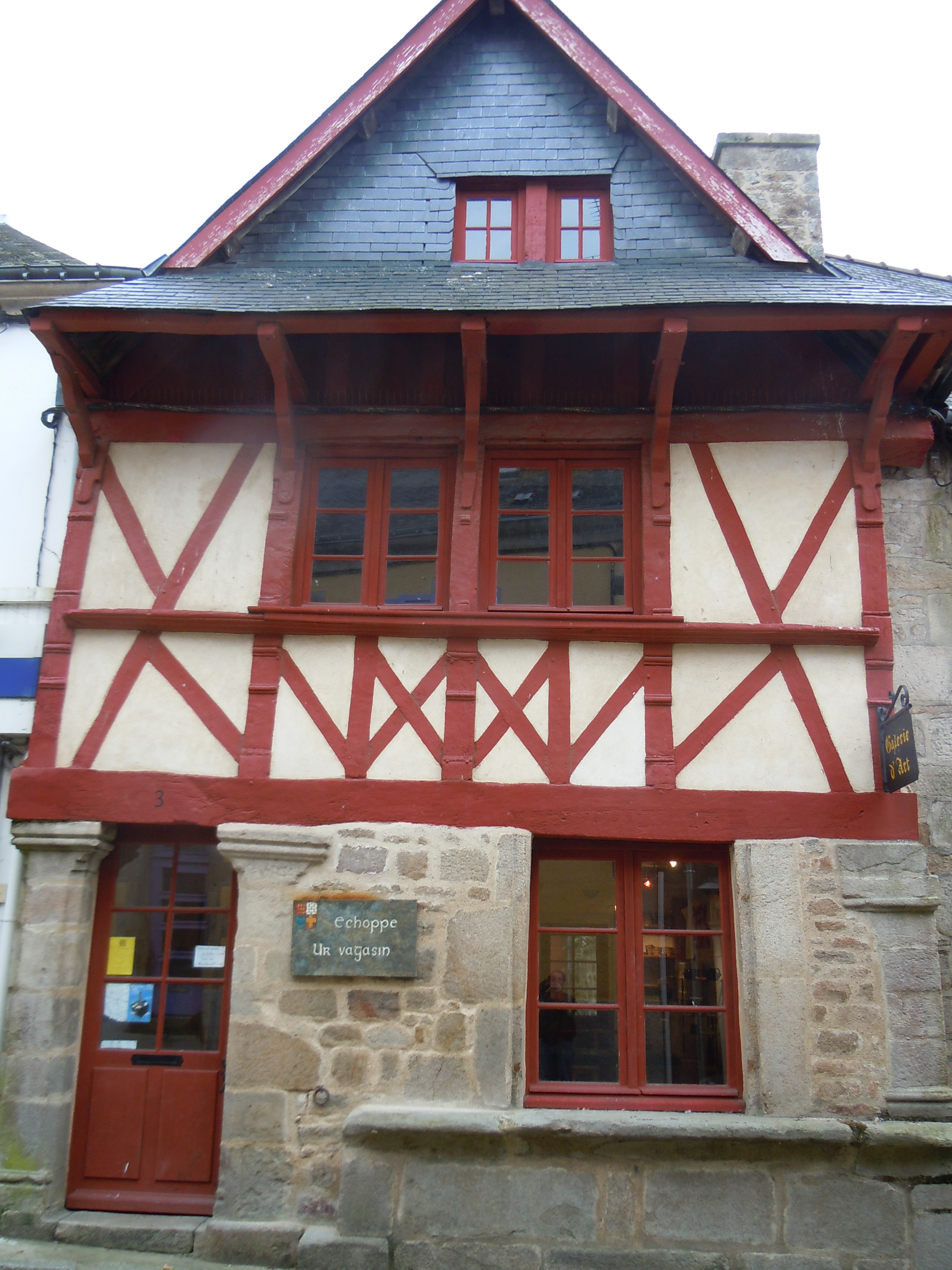
Timbered house called The Stall.

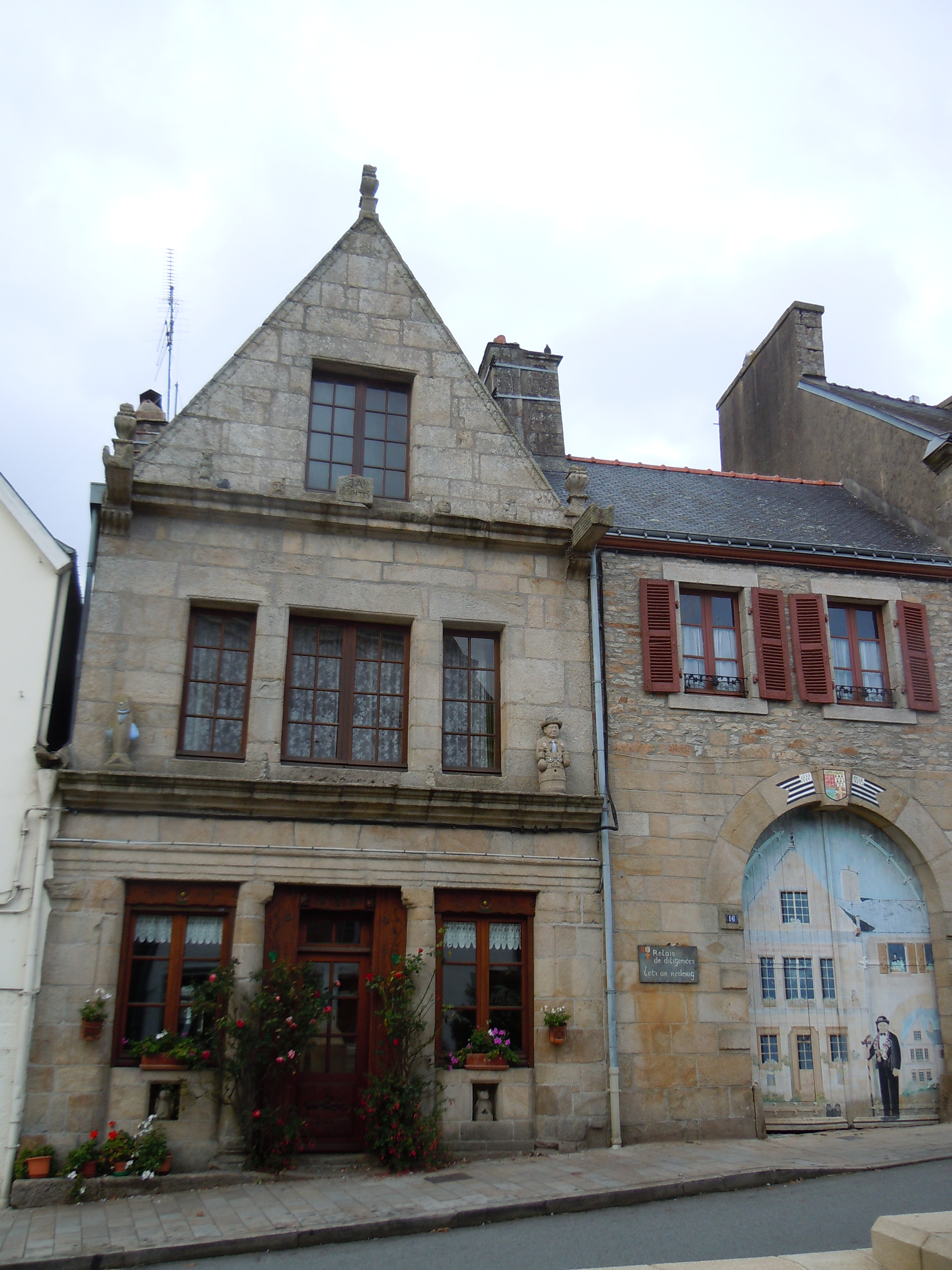
Ancient stage station.

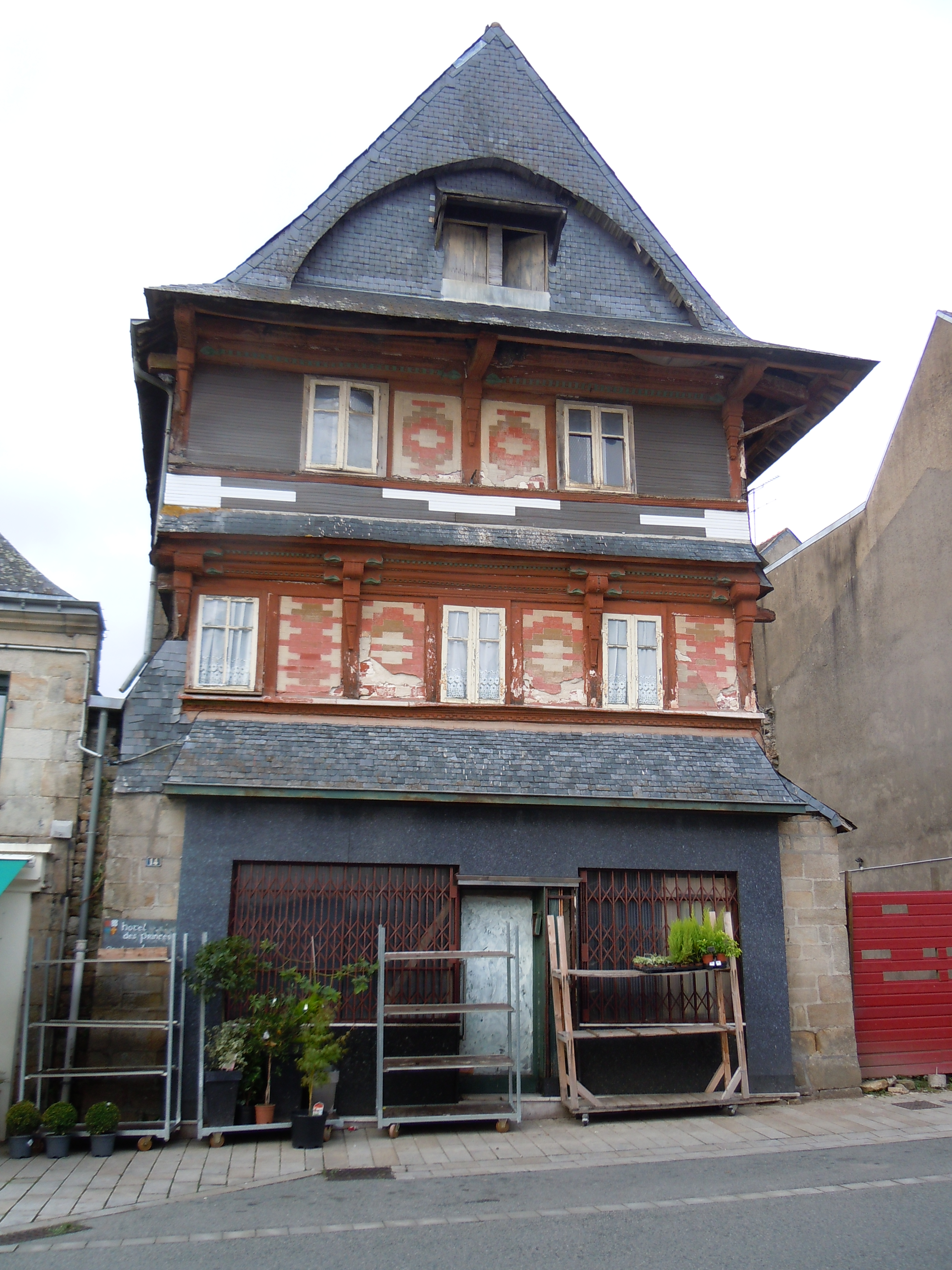
Old house called Princes's Hostel.

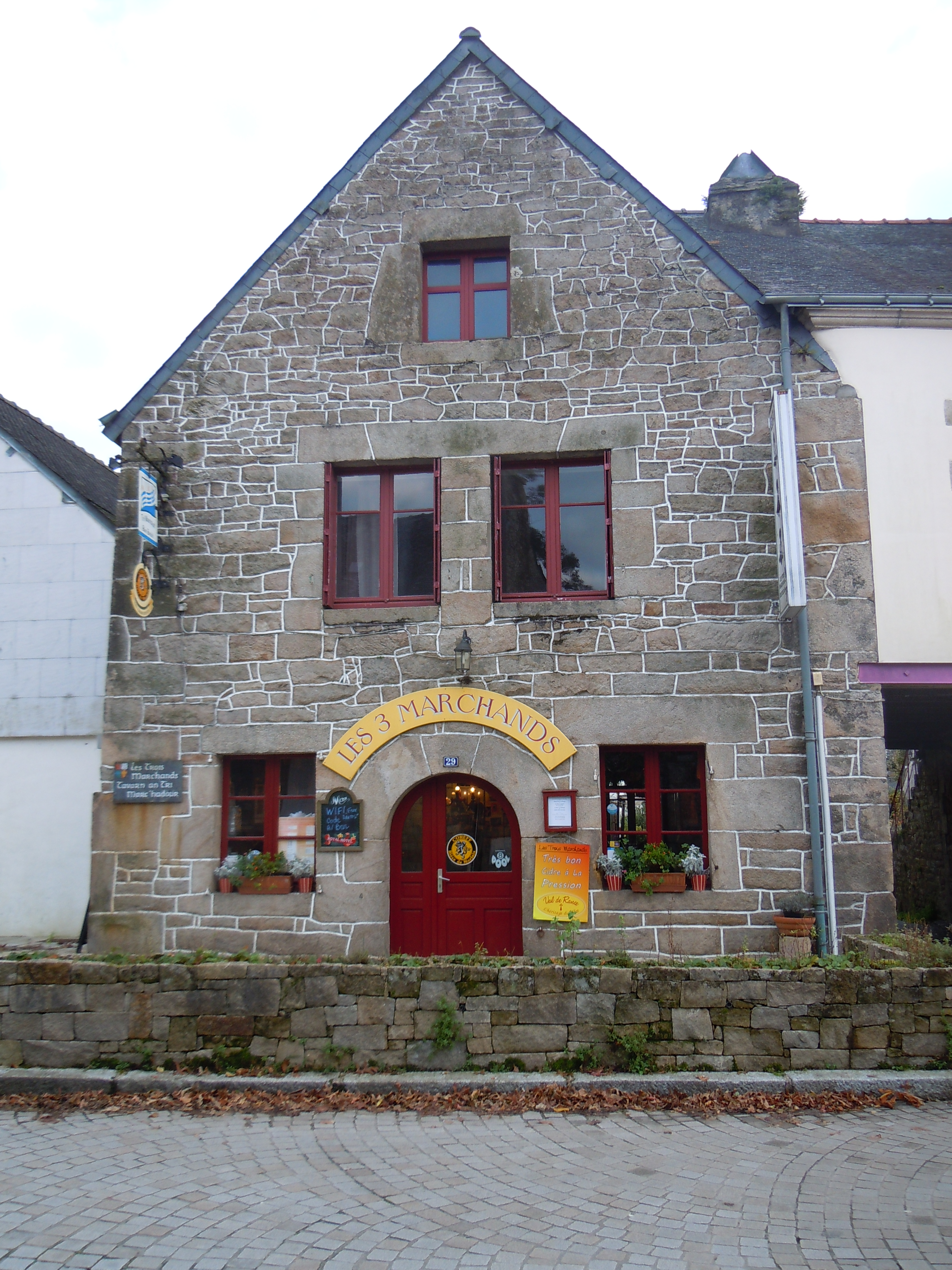
Old tavern called Hôtel des trois marchands.

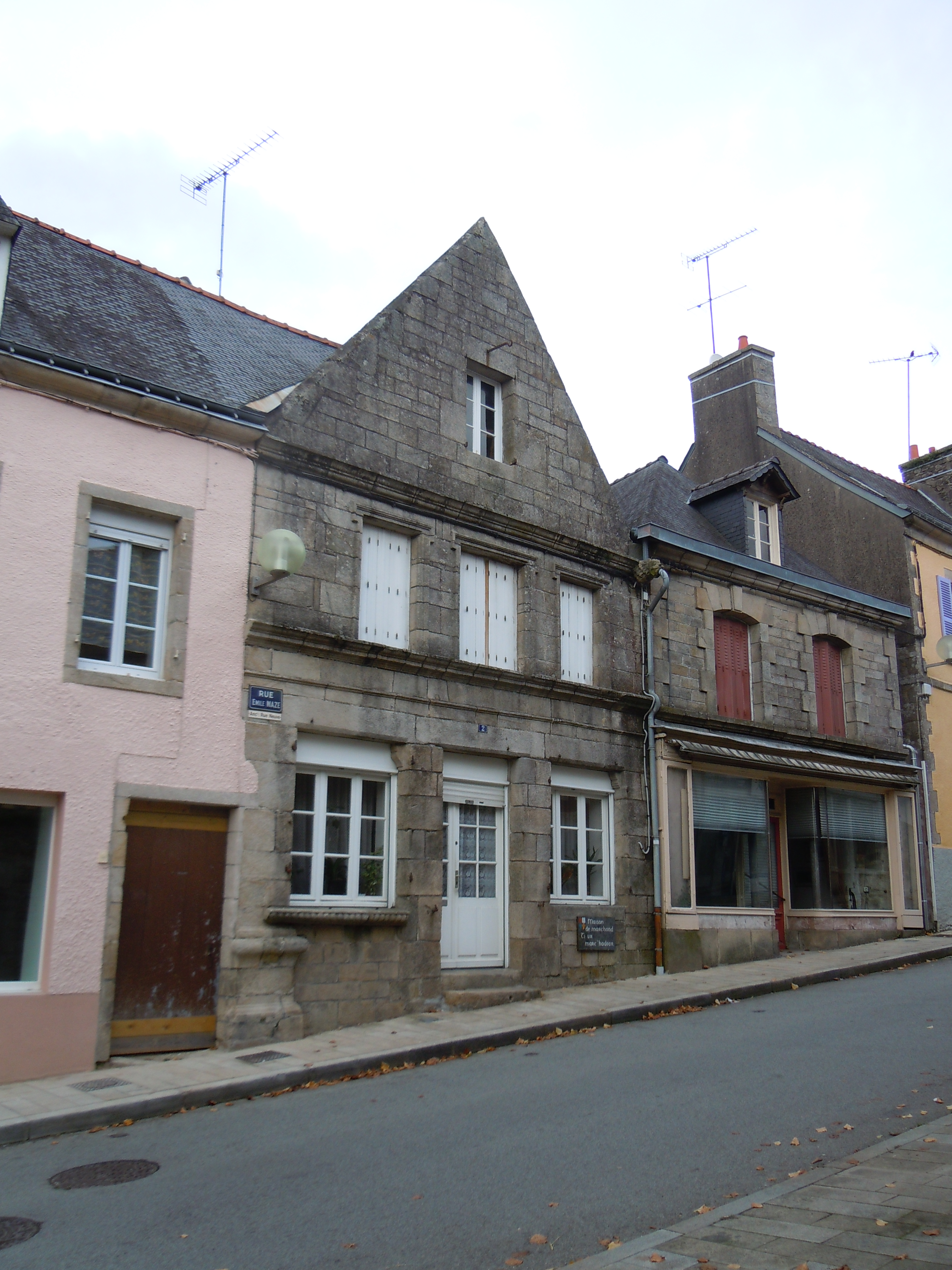
Old house called Merchant's house.

== See also ==
- Communes of the Morbihan department
- Gaston-Auguste Schweitzer Sculptor of Guémené-sur-Scorff war memorial
