= Riantec =

Riantec Rianteg
- Commune
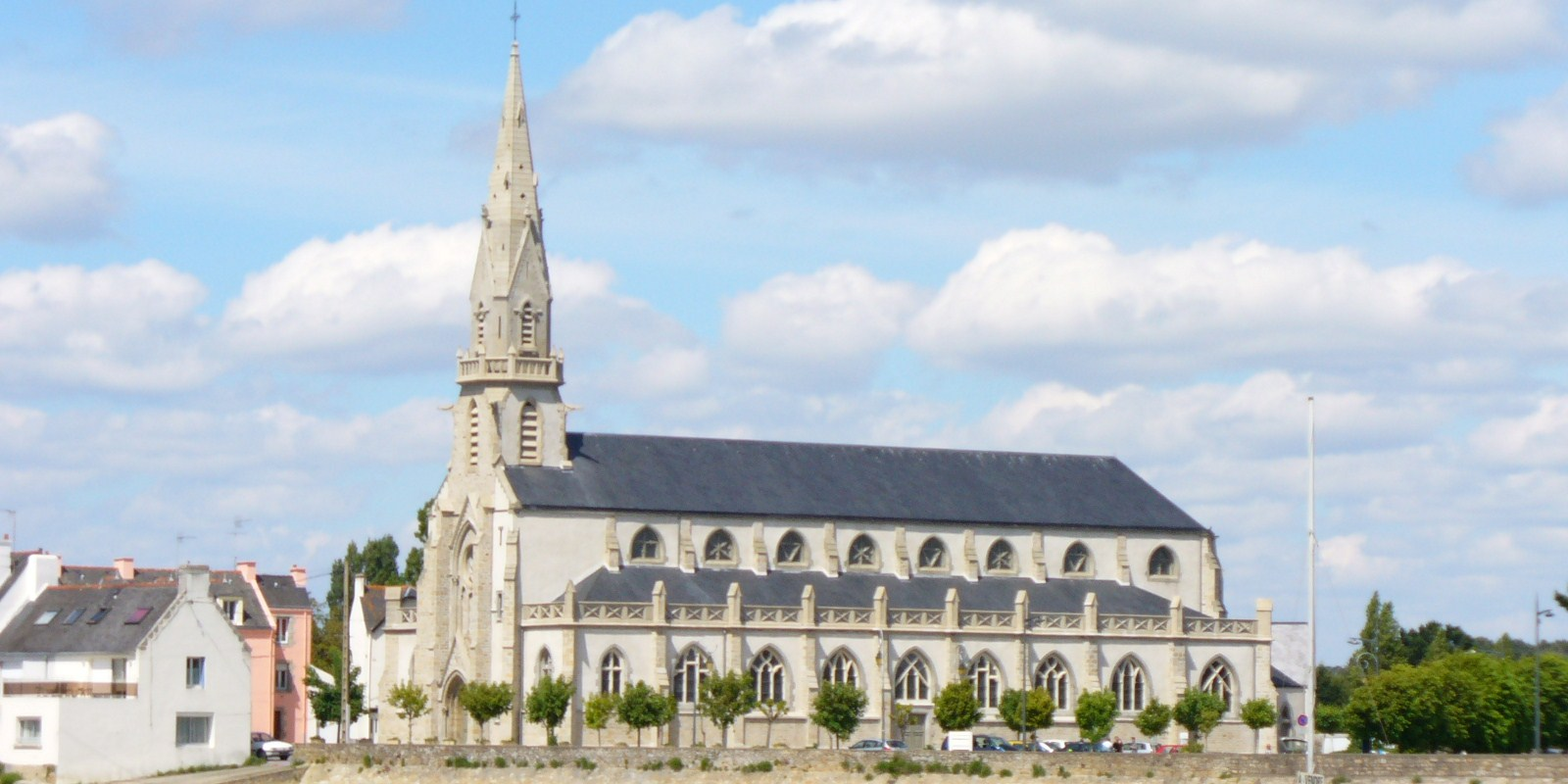
- The church in Riantec

- Coat of arms
- Location of Riantec
- Location within France Location within Brittany
- Coordinates: 47°42′42″N 3°18′33″W
- Country: France
- Region: Brittany
- Department: Morbihan
- Arrondissement: Lorient
- Canton: Hennebont
- Intercommunality: Lorient Agglomération

Government
  - Mayor (2026–32): Gaëtan Malardé
- Area^{1}: 14.06 km^{2} (5.43 sq mi)
- Highest elevation: 35 m (115 ft)
- Lowest elevation: 0 m (0 ft)
- Population (2023): 5,865
  - Density: 417.1/km^{2} (1,080/sq mi)
- Time zone: UTC+01:00 (CET)
  - Summer (DST): UTC+02:00 (CEST)
- INSEE/Postal code: 56193 /56670
- ^{1} French Land Register data, which excludes lakes, ponds, glaciers > 1 km^{2} (0.386 sq mi or 247 acres) and river estuaries.

Riantec (French pronunciation: [ʁjɑ̃tɛk]; Breton: Rianteg) is a commune in the Morbihan department of Brittany in north-western France.

== Geography ==
The village sits on "La Petite Mer de Gavre" (french, The Small Sea of Gavre) with fine views across the bay.

== Map ==
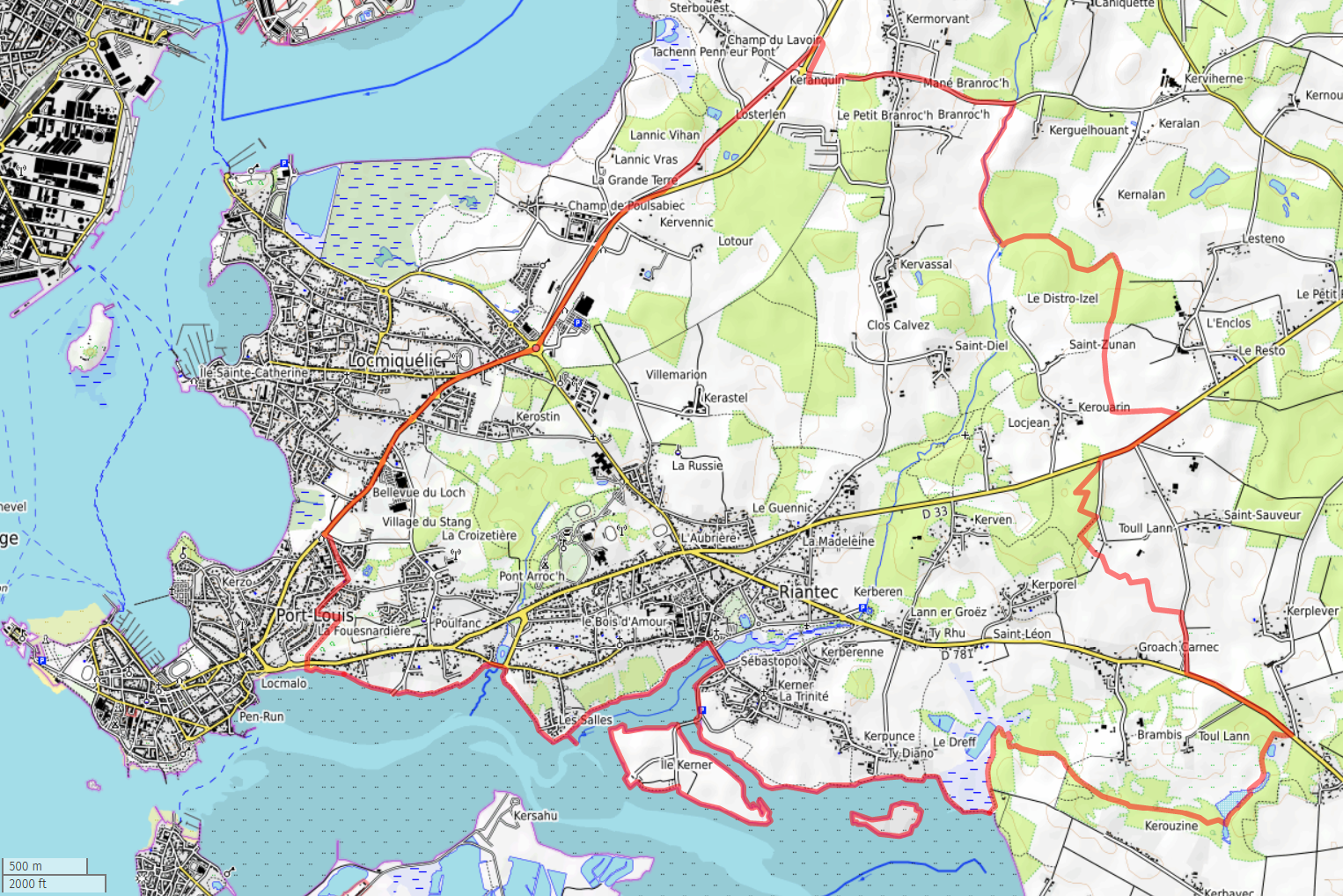
Topographic map

== Population ==
Inhabitants of Riantec are called in French Riantécois.

Historical population
Year	Pop.	±% p.a.
1968	4,126	—
1975	4,128	+0.01%
1982	4,616	+1.61%
1990	4,846	+0.61%
1999	4,765	−0.19%
2007	4,958	+0.50%
2012	5,175	+0.86%
2017	5,622	+1.67%
2023	5,865	+0.71%
Source: INSEE

== See also ==
- Communes of the Morbihan department
