= Scorff =

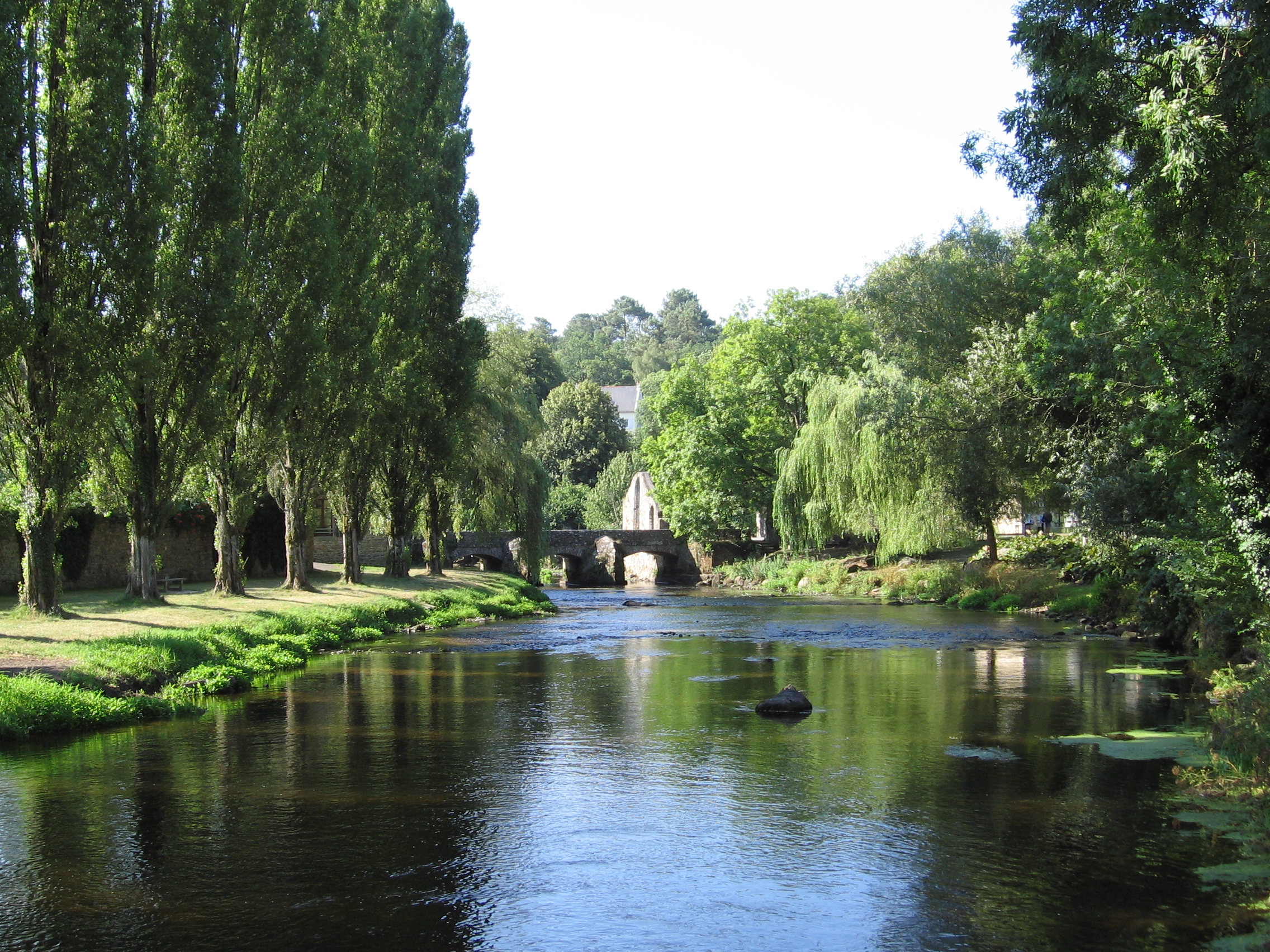
- The Scorff in Pont-Scorff

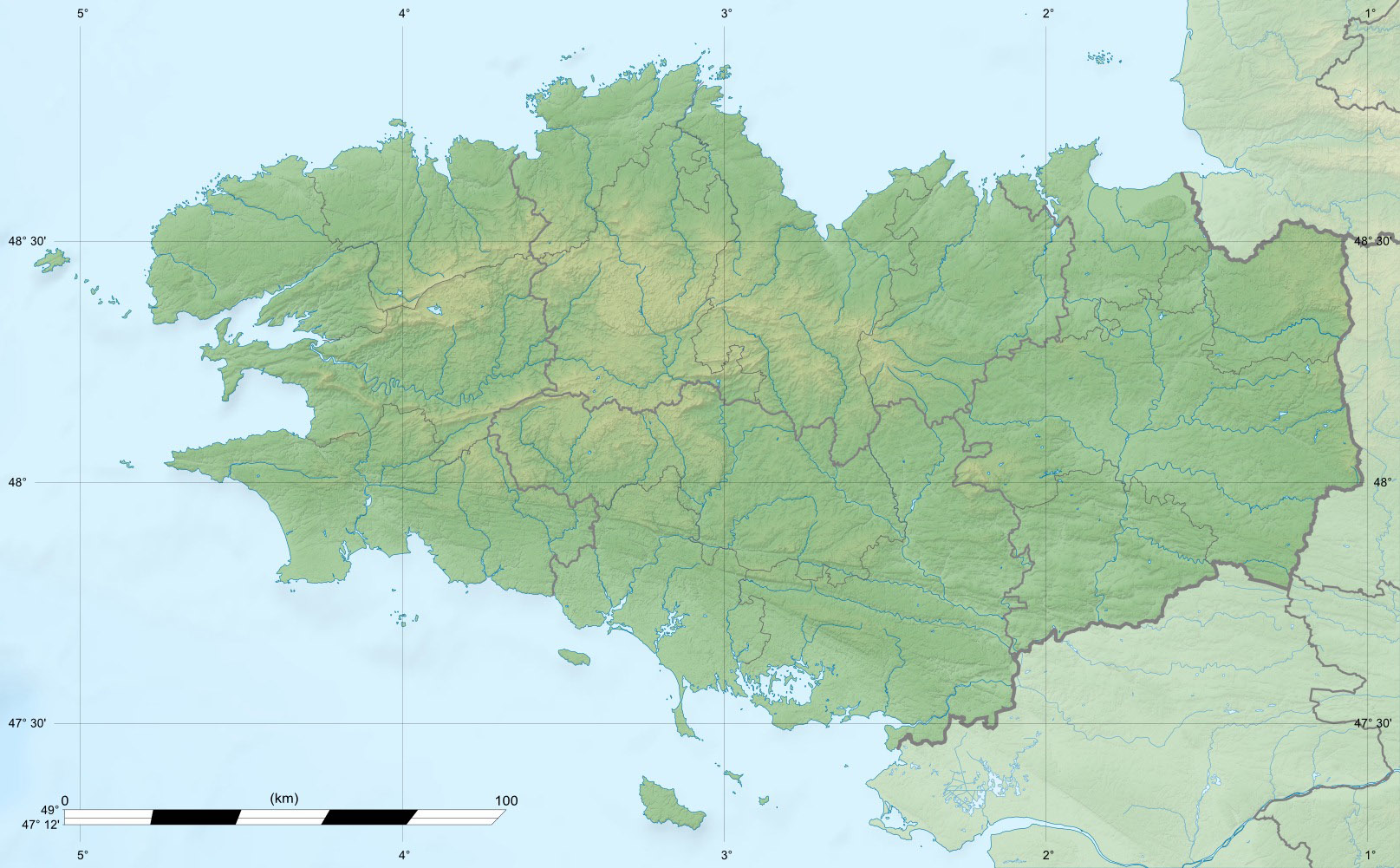
- Location within France Location within Brittany

Location
- Country: France

Physical characteristics
- Source
  - location: Brittany
- Mouth
  - location: Blavet
  - coordinates: 47°44′30″N 3°20′54″W
- Length: 78.6 km (48.8 mi)
- Discharge
  - average: 15 m^{3}/s (530 cu ft/s)

Basin features
- Progression: Blavet→ Atlantic Ocean

The Scorff (French pronunciation: [skɔʁf]; Breton: Skorf) River flows from central Brittany and enters the Atlantic Ocean on the south coast in Lorient.

The Scorff rises north of Langoëlan, in the Morbihan department, and flows through the towns of Guémené-sur-Scorff and Pont-Scorff. From there its bed enlarges to form a ria, submitted to the tides. It joins the Blavet in Lorient, where it enters the Ocean in the roadstead of Lorient.

It is 78.6 km (48.8 mi) long and its basin area is 483 km^{2} (186 sq mi).

== Fauna ==
The river is classified for fishing as "first category" (French: Cours d'eau de première catégorie); it is home to Brown trout and Atlantic salmon.
