= Inguiniel =

Commune in Brittany, France

Inguiniel An Ignel
- Commune
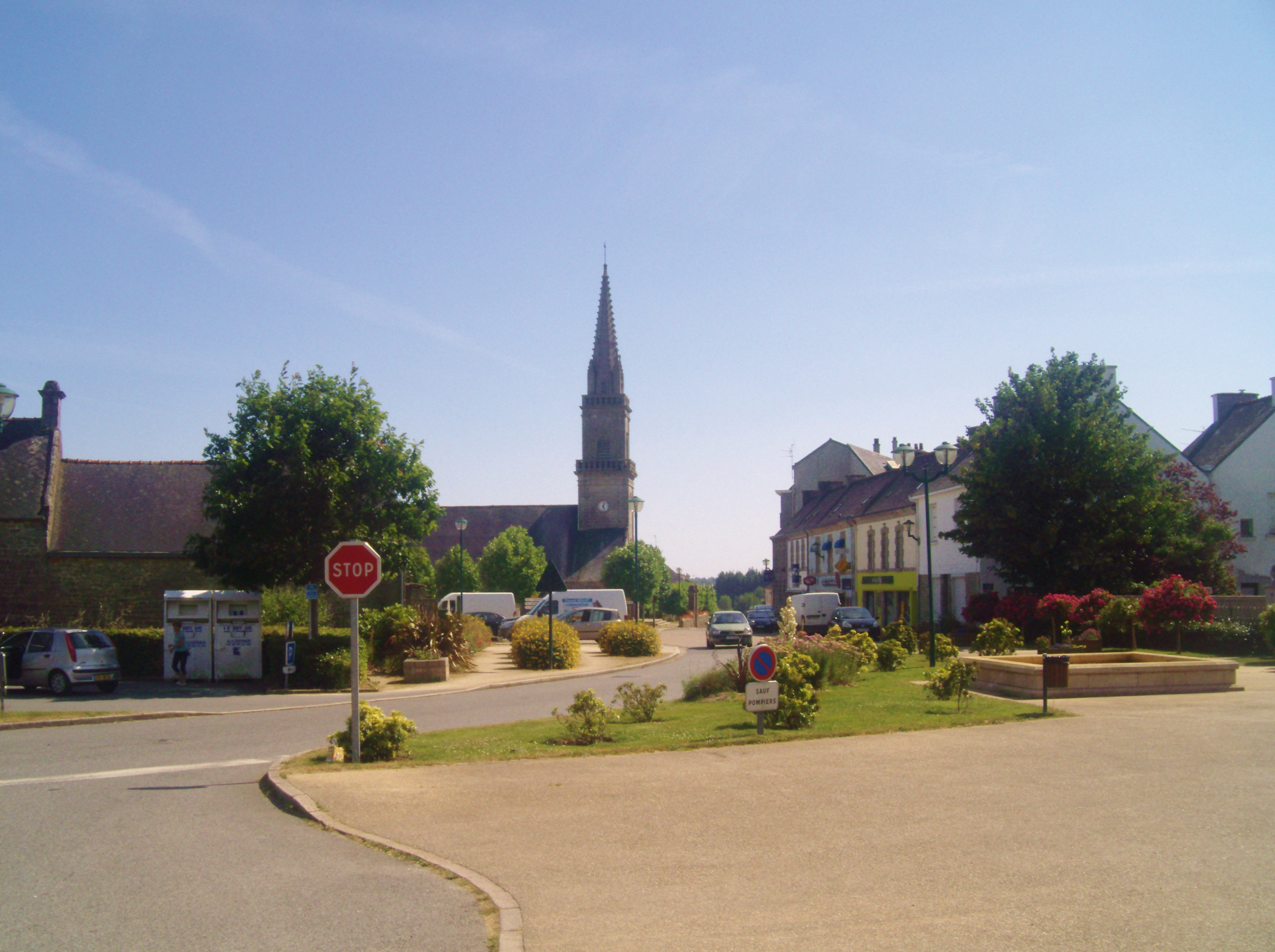
- A view within Inguiniel
- Location of Inguiniel
- Location within France Location within Brittany
- Coordinates: 47°58′37″N 3°16′54″W
- Country: France
- Region: Brittany
- Department: Morbihan
- Arrondissement: Lorient
- Canton: Guidel
- Intercommunality: Lorient Agglomération

Government
  - Mayor (2026–32): Guillaume de Beaufort
- Area^{1}: 51.40 km^{2} (19.85 sq mi)
- Highest elevation: 171 m (561 ft)
- Lowest elevation: 49 m (161 ft)
- Population (2023): 2,188
  - Density: 42.57/km^{2} (110.3/sq mi)
- Time zone: UTC+01:00 (CET)
  - Summer (DST): UTC+02:00 (CEST)
- INSEE/Postal code: 56089 /56240
- ^{1} French Land Register data, which excludes lakes, ponds, glaciers > 1 km^{2} (0.386 sq mi or 247 acres) and river estuaries.

Inguiniel (French pronunciation: [ɛ̃ɡinjɛl]; Breton: An Ignel) is a commune in the Morbihan department in Brittany in north-western France.

== Population ==
Historical population
Year	Pop.	±% p.a.
1968	2,309	—
1975	2,115	−1.25%
1982	2,030	−0.58%
1990	1,968	−0.39%
1999	1,890	−0.45%
2007	2,043	+0.98%
2012	2,069	+0.25%
2017	2,158	+0.85%
2023	2,188	+0.23%
Source: INSEE

Inhabitants of Inguiniel are called in French Inguinielois.

== See also ==
- Communes of the Morbihan department
