= Bubry =

Commune in Brittany, France

Bubry Bubri
- Commune
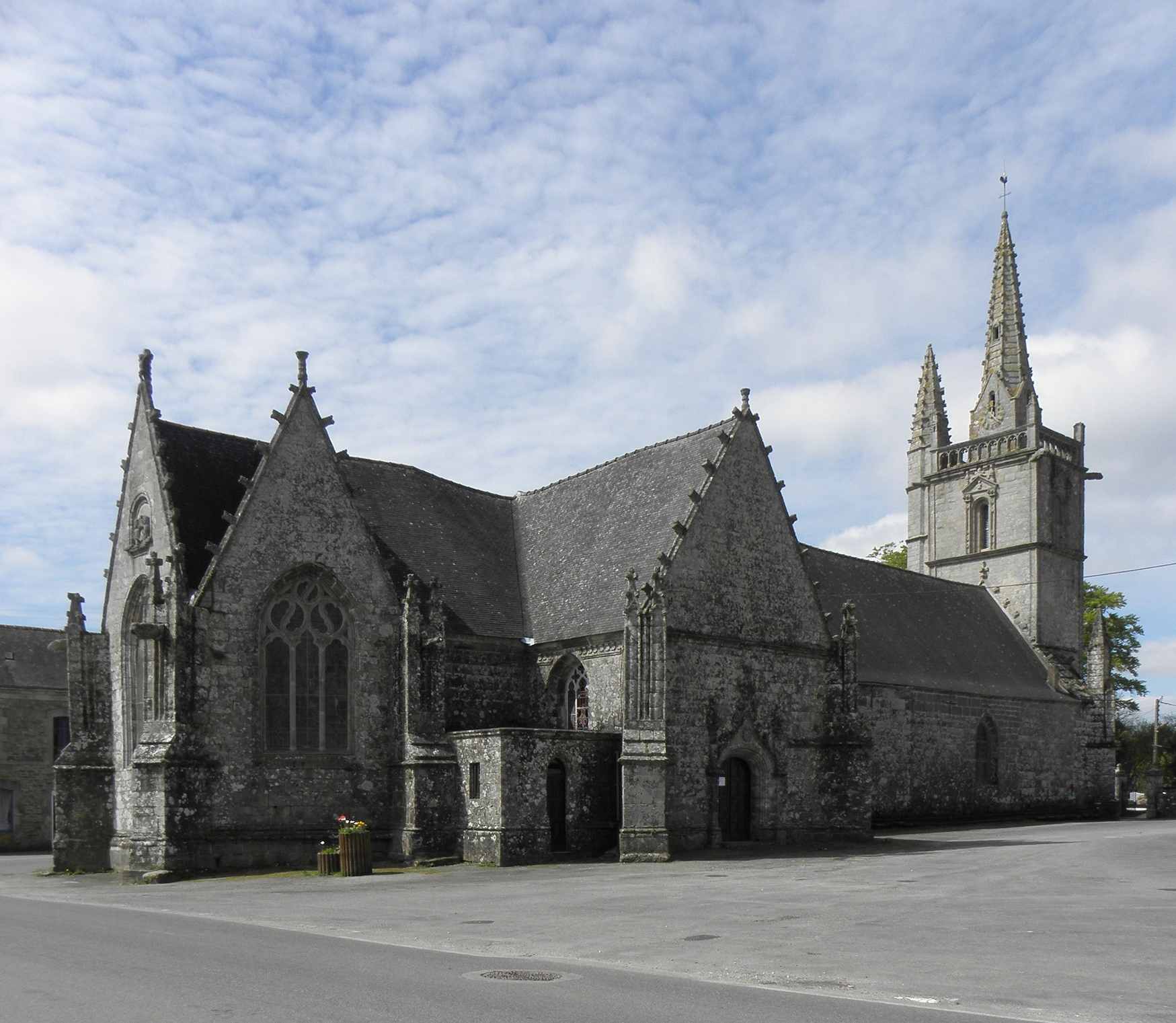
- The chapel of Saint-Yves, in Bubry

- Coat of arms
- Location of Bubry
- Location within France Location within Brittany
- Coordinates: 47°57′52″N 3°10′19″W
- Country: France
- Region: Brittany
- Department: Morbihan
- Arrondissement: Lorient
- Canton: Guidel
- Intercommunality: Lorient Agglomération

Government
  - Mayor (2026–32): Roger Thomazo
- Area^{1}: 69.09 km^{2} (26.68 sq mi)
- Highest elevation: 177 m (581 ft)
- Lowest elevation: 40 m (130 ft)
- Population (2023): 2,242
  - Density: 32.45/km^{2} (84.05/sq mi)
- Time zone: UTC+01:00 (CET)
  - Summer (DST): UTC+02:00 (CEST)
- INSEE/Postal code: 56026 /56310
- ^{1} French Land Register data, which excludes lakes, ponds, glaciers > 1 km^{2} (0.386 sq mi or 247 acres) and river estuaries.

Bubry (French pronunciation: [bybʁi]; Breton: Bubri) is a commune in the Morbihan department of Brittany in northwestern France.

== Population ==
Historical population
Year	Pop.	±% p.a.
1968	3,040	—
1975	2,865	−0.84%
1982	2,563	−1.58%
1990	2,445	−0.59%
1999	2,358	−0.40%
2007	2,329	−0.15%
2012	2,375	+0.39%
2017	2,374	−0.01%
2023	2,242	−0.95%
Source: INSEE

Inhabitants of Bubry are called in French Bubryates.

== International relations ==
Bubry is twinned with Macroom in the Republic of Ireland and with Marcallo con Casone in northern Italy; the three towns have Celtic origins.

== See also ==
- Communes of the Morbihan department
- Gaston-Auguste Schweitzer Sculptor of Bubry war memorial
