= Arrondissement of Lorient =

Coordinates: 47.80°N 3.17°W

Lorient
- Arrondissement
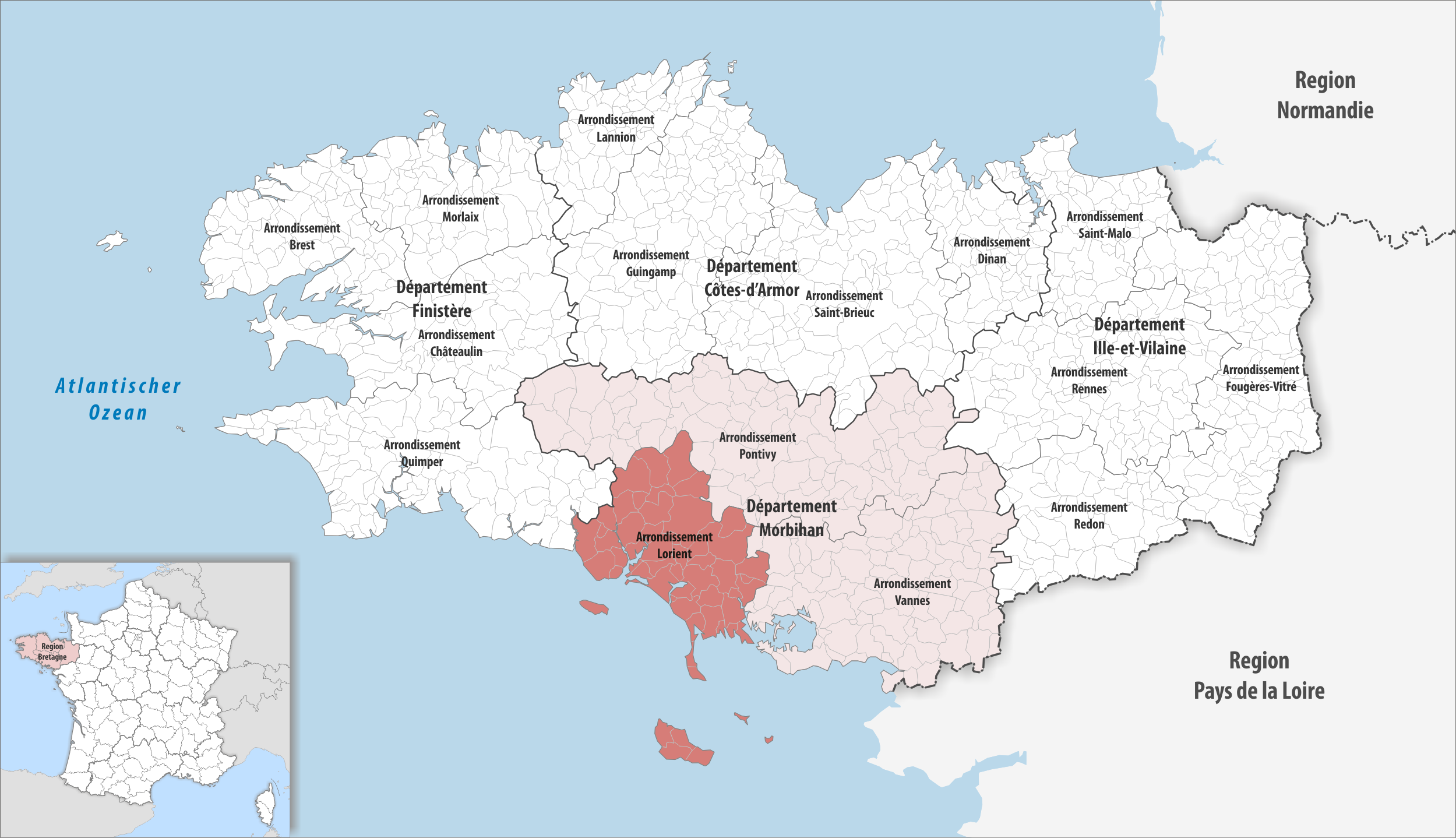
- Location within the region Brittany
- Country: France
- Region: Brittany
- Department: Morbihan
- No. of communes: {{{nbcomm}}}
- Area: 1,461.8 km^{2} (564.4 sq mi)
- Population (2023): 324,555
  - Density: 222.02/km^{2} (575.04/sq mi)
- INSEE code: 561

The arrondissement of Lorient is an arrondissement of France in the Morbihan department in the Brittany region. It has 58 communes. Its population is 320,544 (2021), and its area is 1,461.8 km^{2} (564.4 sq mi).

== Composition ==
The 58 communes of the arrondissement of Lorient, and their INSEE codes, are:

- Auray (56007)
- Bangor (56009)
- Belz (56013)
- Brandérion (56021)
- Brech (56023)
- Bubry (56026)
- Calan (56029)
- Camors (56031)
- Carnac (56034)
- Caudan (56036)
- Cléguer (56040)
- Crach (56046)
- Erdeven (56054)
- Étel (56055)
- Gâvres (56062)
- Gestel (56063)
- Groix (56069)
- Guidel (56078)
- Hennebont (56083)
- Hœdic (56085)
- Île-d'Houat (56086)
- Inguiniel (56089)
- Inzinzac-Lochrist (56090)
- Kervignac (56094)
- Landaul (56096)
- Landévant (56097)
- Lanester (56098)
- Languidic (56101)
- Lanvaudan (56104)
- Larmor-Plage (56107)
- Locmaria (56114)
- Locmariaquer (56116)
- Locmiquélic (56118)
- Locoal-Mendon (56119)
- Lorient (56121)
- Merlevenez (56130)
- Nostang (56148)
- Le Palais (56152)
- Ploemel (56161)
- Ploemeur (56162)
- Plouay (56166)
- Plouharnel (56168)
- Plouhinec (56169)
- Plumergat (56175)
- Pluneret (56176)
- Pluvigner (56177)
- Pont-Scorff (56179)
- Port-Louis (56181)
- Quéven (56185)
- Quiberon (56186)
- Quistinic (56188)
- Riantec (56193)
- Sainte-Anne-d'Auray (56263)
- Sainte-Hélène (56220)
- Saint-Philibert (56233)
- Saint-Pierre-Quiberon (56234)
- Sauzon (56241)
- La Trinité-sur-Mer (56258)

== History ==
The arrondissement of Lorient was created in 1800. At the January 2017 reorganisation of the arrondissements of Morbihan, it lost two communes to the arrondissement of Vannes.

As a result of the reorganisation of the cantons of France which came into effect in 2015, the borders of the cantons are no longer related to the borders of the arrondissements. The fifteen cantons of the arrondissement of Lorient were, as of January 2015:

- Auray
- Belle-Île
- Belz
- Groix
- Hennebont
- Lanester
- Lorient-Centre
- Lorient-Nord
- Lorient-Sud
- Ploemeur
- Plouay
- Pluvigner
- Pont-Scorff
- Port-Louis
- Quiberon
