= Results of the 2024 French legislative election in Morbihan =

Following the first round of the 2024 French legislative election on 30 June 2024, runoff elections in each constituency where no candidate received a vote share greater than 50 percent were scheduled for 7 July. Candidates permitted to stand in the runoff elections needed to either come in first or second place in the first round or achieve more than 12.5 percent of the votes of the entire electorate (as opposed to 12.5 percent of the vote share due to low turnout).

== Morbihan ==
=== 1st constituency ===
Candidate	Party or alliance		First round		Second round	
Candidate	Party or alliance		Votes	%	Votes	%
Anne Le Hénanff	Ensemble	Horizons	35,627	42.13	57,609	71.65
Anne Gallo	New Popular Front	Miscellaneous left	23,884	28.24		
Joseph Martin	National Rally		21,454	25.37	22,792	28.35
Yann Le Baraillec	Miscellaneous left	Independent	1,898	2.24		
Ronan Le Sant	Regionalists	Independent	1,084	1.28		
Marc Peschanski	Far-left	Lutte Ouvrière	432	0.51		
Alice Vasseur	Independent		182	0.22		
Total			84,561	100.00	80,401	100.00
Valid votes			84,561	98.07	80,401	94.82
Invalid votes			416	0.48	1,007	1.19
Blank votes			1,251	1.45	3,387	3.99
Total votes			86,228	100.00	84,795	100.00
Registered voters/turnout			115,573	74.61	115,599	73.35

=== 2nd constituency ===
Candidate	Party or alliance		First round		Second round	
Candidate	Party or alliance		Votes	%	Votes	%
Jimmy Pahun	Ensemble	Democratic Movement	26,667	32.14	52,138	65.44
Florent de Kersauson	National Rally		24,920	30.03	27,541	34.56
Jade Béniguel	New Popular Front	Ecologists	21,405	25.80		
Pierre Clavreuil	Miscellaneous right	Independent	7,472	9.00		
Maëlig Trédan	Regionalists		1,615	1.95		
Yves Cheère	Far-left	Lutte Ouvrière	899	1.08		
Total			82,978	100.00	79,679	100.00
Valid votes			82,978	97.69	79,679	94.50
Invalid votes			562	0.66	1,191	1.41
Blank votes			1,402	1.65	3,450	4.09
Total votes			84,942	100.00	84,320	100.00
Registered voters/turnout			113,726	74.69	113,739	74.13

=== 3rd constituency ===
Candidate	Party or alliance		First round		Second round	
Candidate	Party or alliance		Votes	%	Votes	%
Antoine Oliviero	National Rally		24,584	35.85	27,854	42.44
Nicole Le Peih	Ensemble	Renaissance	18,222	26.57	37,776	57.56
Marie Madeleine Doré-Lucas	New Popular Front	La France Insoumise	13,999	20.41		
Soizic Perrault	Miscellaneous right	The Republicans	8,340	12.16		
Jocelyne Devriendt	Regionalists	Independent	1,078	1.57		
Lionel Epaillard	Ecologists	Independent	943	1.38		
Julie Cuciniello	Sovereigntist right	Debout la France	719	1.05		
Julie Lepert	Far-left	Lutte Ouvrière	688	1.00		
Total			68,573	100.00	65,630	100.00
Valid votes			68,573	97.25	65,630	93.97
Invalid votes			594	0.84	1,258	1.80
Blank votes			1,343	1.90	2,956	4.23
Total votes			70,510	100.00	69,844	100.00
Registered voters/turnout			98,154	71.84	98,156	71.16

=== 4th constituency ===
Candidate	Party or alliance		First round		Second round	
Candidate	Party or alliance		Votes	%	Votes	%
Paul Molac	Regionalists	Independent	28,912	35.84	51,799	65.12
Katel Le Cuillier	National Rally		25,414	31.51	27,745	34.88
Rozenn Guégan	Ensemble	Renaissance	12,487	15.48		
Lhéa Le Flécher	New Popular Front	Communist Party	11,809	14.64		
Bernard Huet	Sovereigntist right	Miscellaneous right	920	1.14		
Khaled Mamar	Ecologists	Independent	602	0.75		
Patrice Crunil	Far-left	Lutte Ouvrière	515	0.64		
Total			80,659	100.00	79,544	100.00
Valid votes			80,659	98.35	79,544	97.60
Invalid votes			339	0.41	511	0.63
Blank votes			1,011	1.23	1,448	1.78
Total votes			82,009	100.00	81,503	100.00
Registered voters/turnout			113,628	72.17	113,649	71.71

=== 5th constituency ===
Candidate	Party or alliance		First round		Second round	
Candidate	Party or alliance		Votes	%	Votes	%
Damien Girard	New Popular Front	The Ecologists	19,612	35.56	21,760	38.88
Lysiane Métayer	Ensemble	Renaissance	19,081	34.60	19,117	34.15
Aurélie Le Goff	National Rally		15,386	27.90	15,096	26.97
Blandine Pierron	Far-left	Lutte Ouvrière	1,067	1.93		
Total			55,146	100.00	55,973	100.00
Valid votes			55,146	97.46	55,973	97.69
Invalid votes			311	0.55	250	0.44
Blank votes			1,128	1.99	1,075	1.88
Total votes			56,585	100.00	57,298	100.00
Registered voters/turnout			80,820	70.01	80,823	70.89

=== 6th constituency ===
Candidate	Party or alliance		First round		Second round	
Candidate	Party or alliance		Votes	%	Votes	%
Nathalie Guihot-Vieira	National Rally		22,728	34.69	25,346	40.02
Jean-Michel Jacques	Ensemble	Renaissance	21,675	33.08	37,983	59.98
Jean-Michel Baudry	New Popular Front	La France Insoumise	15,561	23.75		
Daniel Barach	Miscellaneous right	The Republicans	3,513	5.36		
Kelig Lagrée	Far-left	Lutte Ouvrière	1,213	1.85		
Valère Charlery	Sovereigntist right	Debout la France	835	1.27		
Total			65,525	100.00	63,329	100.00
Valid votes			65,525	97.07	63,329	94.03
Invalid votes			575	0.85	1,141	1.69
Blank votes			1,404	2.08	2,877	4.27
Total votes			67,504	100.00	67,347	100.00
Registered voters/turnout			93,830	71.94	93,842	71.77
