= Sibylle Riqueti de Mirabeau =

French writer

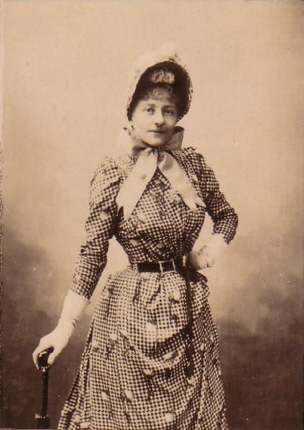
- Born: 16 August 1849; Plumergat, France
- Died: 28 June 1932 (aged 82); Neuilly-sur-Seine, France
- Occupation: Writer
- Writing career
- Pen name: Gyp

Signature
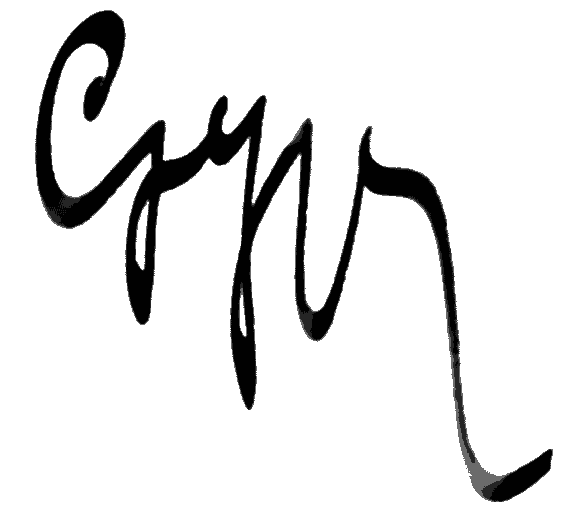

Sibylle Aimée Marie-Antoinette Gabrielle de Riquetti de Mirabeau, comtesse de Martel de Janville (16 August 1849 – 28 June 1932) was a French writer who wrote under the pseudonym Gyp.

== Life ==
Riquetti de Mirabeau was born at the château de Coëtsal near Plumergat, in the département of the Morbihan, in Brittany, her father, Joseph-Arundel de Riquetti, comte de Mirabeau, 1820–1860, being the great-grandson of Victor de Riquetti, marquis de Mirabeau (Mirabeau Père), noted 18th-century economist, and grandnephew of Honoré Mirabeau the celebrated revolutionary orator. In view of her later opinions, it is interesting to remember that Sibylle was actually descended from Octave Mirabeau's royalist younger brother, André-Boniface-Louis de Riquetti, vicomte de Mirabeau, (1754–1792) known as Mirabeau-Tonneau because of his notorious embonpoint, who famously broke his sword in front of France's Revolutionary Assembly (where he represented the nobility of the Limousin) while bitterly crying out: "now that The King is giving up his kingdom, a nobleman no longer needs a sword to fight for him!"

Although, in her memoirs, "Gyp" stated that she had been born on August 15, which happens to have been Napoleon Bonaparte's birthday, her birth certificate reads "morning of August 16, 1849", according to her biographer, W. Z. Silvermann. At her father's request, the name on her birth certificate was revised to read "Sibylle Aimée Marie Antoinette Gabrielle".

Sibylle's mother, the comtesse de Mirabeau, née de Gonneville (1827–1903) was also a writer, who contributed to Le Figaro. In 1869, Sibylle married count Roger de Martel de Janville, by whom she had three children.

Gyp wrote humorous sketches and novels which brazenly denounced her own fashionable society as well as the French republic's political class. She hated republicanism, populist democracy, and party shenanigans; supported Boulanger; and was a fanatical anti-Semite & anti-Dreyfusard; in fact, while testifying at a court case in 1899 she gave her profession as "anti-Semite" rather than "writer". She began with some articles in La Vie parisienne in February 1877, then in La Revue des Deux Mondes. Starting in 1880, she began to publish in book form, under the pseudonym of Gyp, a total of more than 120 works, many highly successful: Petit Bob, (1882), Les Chasseurs, Un trio turbulent, Autour du mariage (1883), Ce que femme veut (1883), Sans voiles (1885), Autour du divorce (1886), Dans le train (1886), Mademoiselle Loulou (1888), Bob au salon (1889), L'éducation d'un prince (1890), Passionette (1891), Oh! la grande vie (1891), Une Election à Tigre-sur-mer (1890), based on Gyp's experience supporting a boulangiste candidate, Marriage civil (1892), Ces bons docteurs (1892) De haut en bas (1893), Le Mariage de Chiffon (1894), Leurs âmes (1895), Le Cœur d'Ariane (1895), Le Bonheur de Ginette (1896), Totote (1897), Lune de miel (1898), Israel (1898), L'Entrevue (1899), Le Pays des champs (1900), Trop de chic (1900), Le Friquet (1901), La Fée (1902), Un Mariage chic (1903), Un Ménage dernier cri (1903), Maman (1904), Le Cœur de Pierrette (1905), Les Flanchards (1917), Souvenirs d'une petite fille (1927–1928), etc.

Her best-known work is probably Le Mariage de Chiffon, filmed in 1942 by Claude Autant-Lara.

Because of her unpopular opinions, the comtesse was the victim of several attempts on her life as well as of a sensational kidnapping.

Gyp, self-styled "last of the Mirabeaus", died at Neuilly-sur-Seine on 28 June 1932.

== Works ==
- La Vertu de la baronne, Calmann-Lévy, 1882
- Petit Bob, Calmann-Lévy, 1882
- Ce que femme veut, Calmann-Lévy, 1883
- Un homme délicat, Calmann-Lévy, 1884
- Le Monde à côté, Calmann-Lévy, 1884
- Plume et Poil, Calmann-Lévy, 1884
- Elle et lui, Calmann-Lévy, 1885
- Sans voiles !, Calmann-Lévy, 1885
- Le Druide, roman parisien, Victor-Havard, 1885
- Le Plus heureux de tous, 1885
- Autour du divorce, Calmann-Lévy, 1886
- Dans l'train, Victor-Havard, 1886
- Joies conjugales, Calmann-Lévy, 1887
- Pour ne pas l'être ?, Calmann-Lévy, 1887
- Les Chasseurs, Calmann-Lévy, 1887
- Mademoiselle Loulou, Calmann-Lévy, 1888
- Petit Bleu, Calmann-Lévy, 1888
- Bob au salon, Calmann-Lévy, 1888
- Pauvres petites femmes, Calmann-Lévy, 1888
- Les Séducteurs, Calmann-Lévy, 1888
- Bob à l'exposition, Calmann-Lévy, 1889
- Ohé, les psychologues!, Calmann-Lévy, 1889
- Mademoiselle Ève, Calmann-Lévy, 1889
- Une élection à Tigre-sur-Mer, racontée par Bob, 1890
- L'Éducation d'un prince, Calmann-Lévy, 1890
- Ô province !, Calmann-Lévy, 1890
- Ohé, la grande vie !, Calmann-Lévy, 1891
- Un raté, Calmann-Lévy, 1891 (également publié sous forme de roman-feuilleton dans Le Figaro du 8 janvier 1891 au 10 février 1891)
- Une passionnette, Calmann-Lévy, 1891
- Monsieur Fred, Calmann-Lévy, 1891
- Mariage civil, Calmann-Lévy, 1892
- Tante Joujou, Calmann-Lévy, 1892
- Monsieur le duc, Calmann-Lévy, 1892
- Madame la duchesse, Calmann-Lévy, 1893
- Pas jalouse, Calmann-Lévy, 1893
- Le Treizième, Calmann-Lévy, 1894
- Du haut en bas, Charpentier et Fasquelle, 1894
- Le Journal d'un philosophe, Charpentier et Fasquelle, 1894
- Le Mariage de Chiffon, Calmann-Lévy, 1894
- Professional Lover, Calmann-Lévy, 1894
- Le Cœur d'Ariane, Calmann-Lévy, 1895
- Ces bons Normands, Calmann-Lévy, 1895
- Leurs âmes, Calmann-Lévy, 1895
- Les Gens chics, Charpentier et Fasquelle, 1895
- Bijou, Calmann-Lévy, 1896
- Ohé, les dirigeants!, Léon Chailley, 1896
- Le Bonheur de Ginette, Calmann-Lévy, 1896
- Eux et elle, Calmann-Lévy, 1896
- Le Baron Sinaï, Charpentier et Fasquelle, 1897
- La Fée Surprise, Calmann-Lévy, 1897
- En balade: images coloriées du petit Bob, Mongredien, 1897
- Joie d'amour, Calmann-Lévy, 1897
- Totote : roman inédit, agrémenté de photos de Paul Sescau, Librairie Nilsson, 1897
- Ces bons docteurs ! , Calmann-Lévy, 1898
- Israël, Flammarion, 1898
- Miquette, Calmann-Lévy, 1898
- Journal d'un grinchu, Flammarion, 1898
- Sportmanomanie, Calmann-Lévy, 1898
- Lune de miel, Calmann-Lévy, 1898
- Les Femmes du colonel, Flammarion, 1899
- Les Izolâtres, Juven, 1899
- Les Cayenne de Rio, Flammarion, 1899
- L'Entrevue, Librairie Nilsson, 1899
- Monsieur de Folleuil, Calmann-Lévy, 1899
- Balancez vos dames, Librairie Nilsson, 1900
- Trop de chic !, Calmann-Lévy, 1900
- Journal d'une qui s'en fiche, Juven, 1900
- Martinette, Librairie Nilsson, 1900
- Jacquette et Zouzou, Flammarion, 1901
- Friquet, Flammarion, 1901
- Un mariage chic, Flammarion, 1902
- La Fée, Librairie Nilsson, 1902
- L'Âge du mufle, Juven, 1902
- Les Amoureux, Juven, 1902
- Les Chapons, Juven, 1902
- Sœurette, Juven, 1902
- Les Chéris, Juven, 1903
- Les Petits Amis, Juven, 1903
- Un ménage dernier cri, Flammarion, 1903
- Cloclo, Flammarion, 1904
- Pervenche, Juven, 1904
- Les Poires, Juven, 1904
- Les Froussards, Flammarion, 1904
- Maman, Librairie Nilsson, 1904
- Geneviève, Juven, 1905
- Le Cœur de Pierrette, Fayard, 1905
- Journal d'un casserolé, Juven, 1905
- Le Cricri, Juven, 1907
- L'Âge du toc, Flammarion, 1907
- La Bonne Galette, Fayard, 1907
- Doudou, Librairie Nilsson, 1907
- La Paix des champs, Juven, 1908
- La Bassinoire, Flammarion, 1908
- La Chasse de Blanche, nouvelles, Flammarion, 1909
- Entre la poire et le fromage, Juven, 1909
- L’Amoureux de Line, Flammarion, 1910
- Les Petits Joyeux, Calmann-Lévy, 1911
- Totote, Fayard, 1911
- L’Affaire Débrouillard-Delatamize, Calmann-Lévy, 1911
- La Bonne Fortune de Toto, Calmann-Lévy, 1911
- La Ginguette, Flammarion, 1911.
- La Meilleure Amie, Fayard, 1912
- Fraîcheur, Calmann-Lévy, 1912
- Napoléonette, Calmann-Lévy, 1913
- La Dame de Saint-Leu, Calmann-Lévy, 1914
- La Petite Pintade bleue, Calmann-Lévy, 1914
- Les Flanchards, 1917
- Les Profitards, Fayard, 1918
- L’Amour aux champs, 1920
- Souricette, Calmann-Lévy, 1922
- Le Coup du lapin, 1929
- Du temps des cheveux et des chevaux: Souvenirs du Second Empire, Calmann-Lévy, 1929
- Celui qu'on aime, Flammarion, 1931
- Le Chambard, Le Livre moderne illustré, Ferenczi & fils, 1931
- Doudou, 2de édition 1931
- La Joyeuse Enfance de la III^{e} République, Calmann-Lévy, 1931

=== Théâtre ===
- Autour du mariage, Calmann-Lévy, 1883, comédie en cinq actes
- Tout-à-l'égout !, Calmann-Lévy, 1889, petite revue en trois actes et un prologue représentée à Paris au Helder, le 10 janvier 1889
- Sauvetage, pièce en un acte, Théâtre d'Application, 1890
- Mademoiselle Ève, 1895, adaptation pour le scène du roman éponyme
- Napoléonette, pièce en cinq actes et un prologue, d'après le roman éponyme, représentée au théâtre Sarah-Bernhardt, le 29 mai 1919, parue dans
- L'Illustration en 1921
