= Plouhinec =

Plouhinec can refer to two municipalities in the French region of Brittany:

- Plouhinec, Finistère
- Plouhinec, Morbihan
