= Brech =

Commune in Brittany, France

Brech Brec'h
- Commune
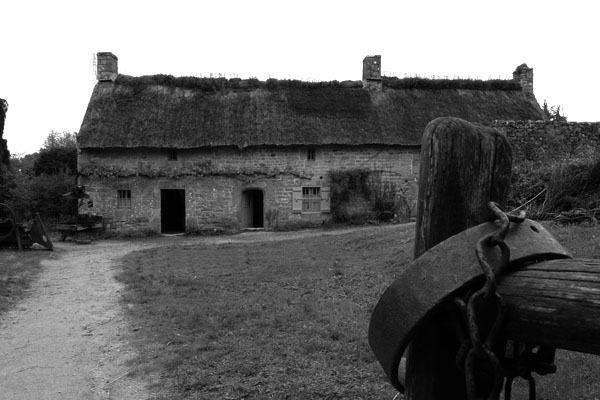
- The museum of Saint-Dégan
- Location of Brech
- Location within France Location within Brittany
- Coordinates: 47°43′17″N 2°59′40″W
- Country: France
- Region: Brittany
- Department: Morbihan
- Arrondissement: Lorient
- Canton: Pluvigner
- Intercommunality: Auray Quiberon Terre Atlantique

Government
  - Mayor (2026–32): Fabrice Robelet
- Area^{1}: 40.86 km^{2} (15.78 sq mi)
- Highest elevation: 66 m (217 ft)
- Lowest elevation: 0 m (0 ft)
- Population (2023): 7,052
  - Density: 172.6/km^{2} (447.0/sq mi)
- Time zone: UTC+01:00 (CET)
  - Summer (DST): UTC+02:00 (CEST)
- INSEE/Postal code: 56023 /56400
- ^{1} French Land Register data, which excludes lakes, ponds, glaciers > 1 km^{2} (0.386 sq mi or 247 acres) and river estuaries.

Brech (French pronunciation: [bʁɛk]; Breton: Brec'h, [ˈbrɛːx]) is a commune in the Morbihan department, region of Brittany, northwestern France.

== Population ==
Inhabitants of Brec'h are called in French Brechois.

Historical population
Year	Pop.	±% p.a.
1968	2,909	—
1975	3,079	+0.81%
1982	3,554	+2.07%
1990	3,990	+1.46%
1999	4,500	+1.35%
2007	6,125	+3.93%
2012	6,616	+1.55%
2017	6,637	+0.06%
2023	7,052	+1.02%
Source: INSEE

== Breton language ==
In 2008, 19.56% of primary-school children attended bilingual schools.

== See also ==
- Communes of the Morbihan department
