= Plumergat =

Plumergat Pluvergad
- Commune
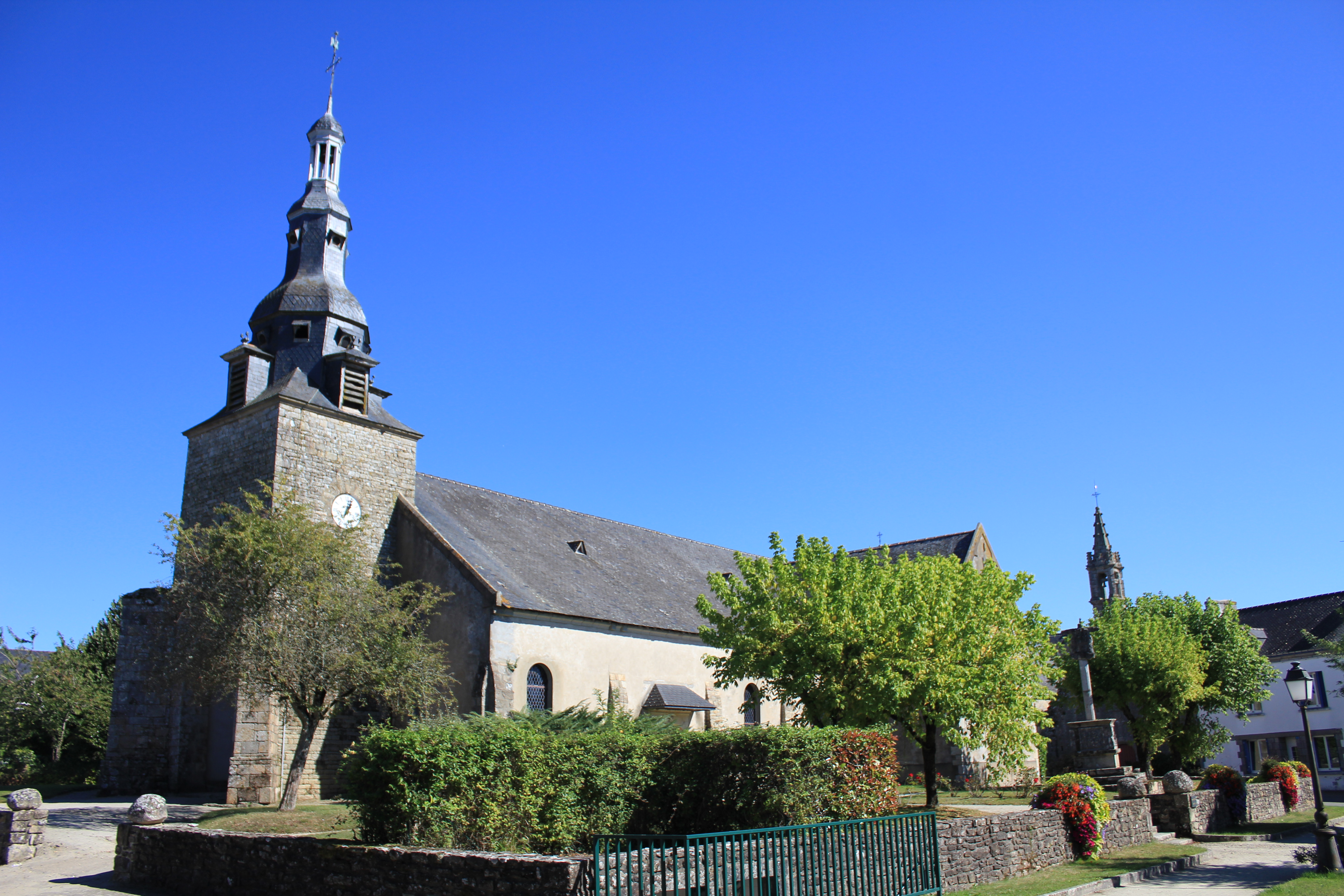
- The church of Saint-Thuriau, in Plumergat

- Coat of arms
- Location of Plumergat
- Location within France Location within Brittany
- Coordinates: 47°44′32″N 2°55′00″W
- Country: France
- Region: Brittany
- Department: Morbihan
- Arrondissement: Lorient
- Canton: Auray
- Intercommunality: Auray Quiberon Terre Atlantique

Government
  - Mayor (2026–32): Sandrine Cadoret
- Area^{1}: 41.94 km^{2} (16.19 sq mi)
- Highest elevation: 88 m (289 ft)
- Lowest elevation: 17 m (56 ft)
- Population (2023): 4,207
  - Density: 100.3/km^{2} (259.8/sq mi)
- Time zone: UTC+01:00 (CET)
  - Summer (DST): UTC+02:00 (CEST)
- INSEE/Postal code: 56175 /56400
- ^{1} French Land Register data, which excludes lakes, ponds, glaciers > 1 km^{2} (0.386 sq mi or 247 acres) and river estuaries.

Plumergat (Breton: Pluvergad) is a commune in the Morbihan department of Brittany in north-western France.

== Geography ==
Plumergat is located 10 km (6.2 mi) northeast of Auray, 15 km (9.3 mi) northwest of Vannes and 34 km (21 mi) east of Lorient. Plumergat is border by Sainte-Anne-d'Auray and Pluneret to the south. The village of Meriadec, which has 700 inhabitants, is divided in two between Pluneret and Plumergat.

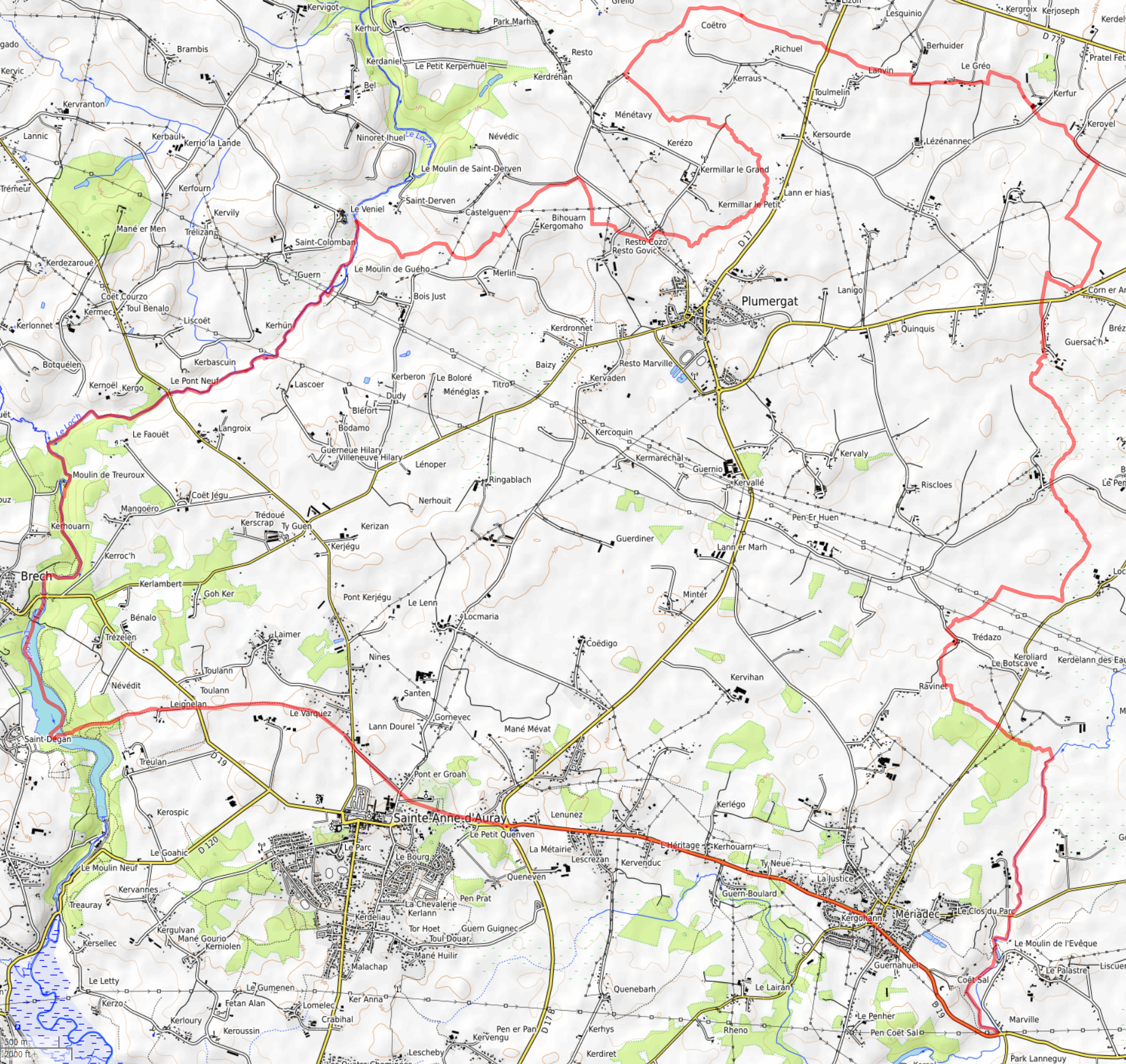
Topographic map.

== Population ==
Historical population
Year	Pop.	±% p.a.
1968	1,773	—
1975	1,961	+1.45%
1982	2,291	+2.25%
1990	2,449	+0.84%
1999	2,597	+0.65%
2007	3,232	+2.77%
2012	3,774	+3.15%
2017	4,112	+1.73%
2023	4,207	+0.38%
Source: INSEE

Inhabitants of Plumergat are called in French Plumergatais.

== Breton language ==
In 2011, 6.6% of the children attended the bilingual schools in primary education.

== See also ==
- Communes of the Morbihan department
