= Sainte-Anne station =

Railway station in Pluneret, France

Sainte-Anne (Morbihan) Santez Anna
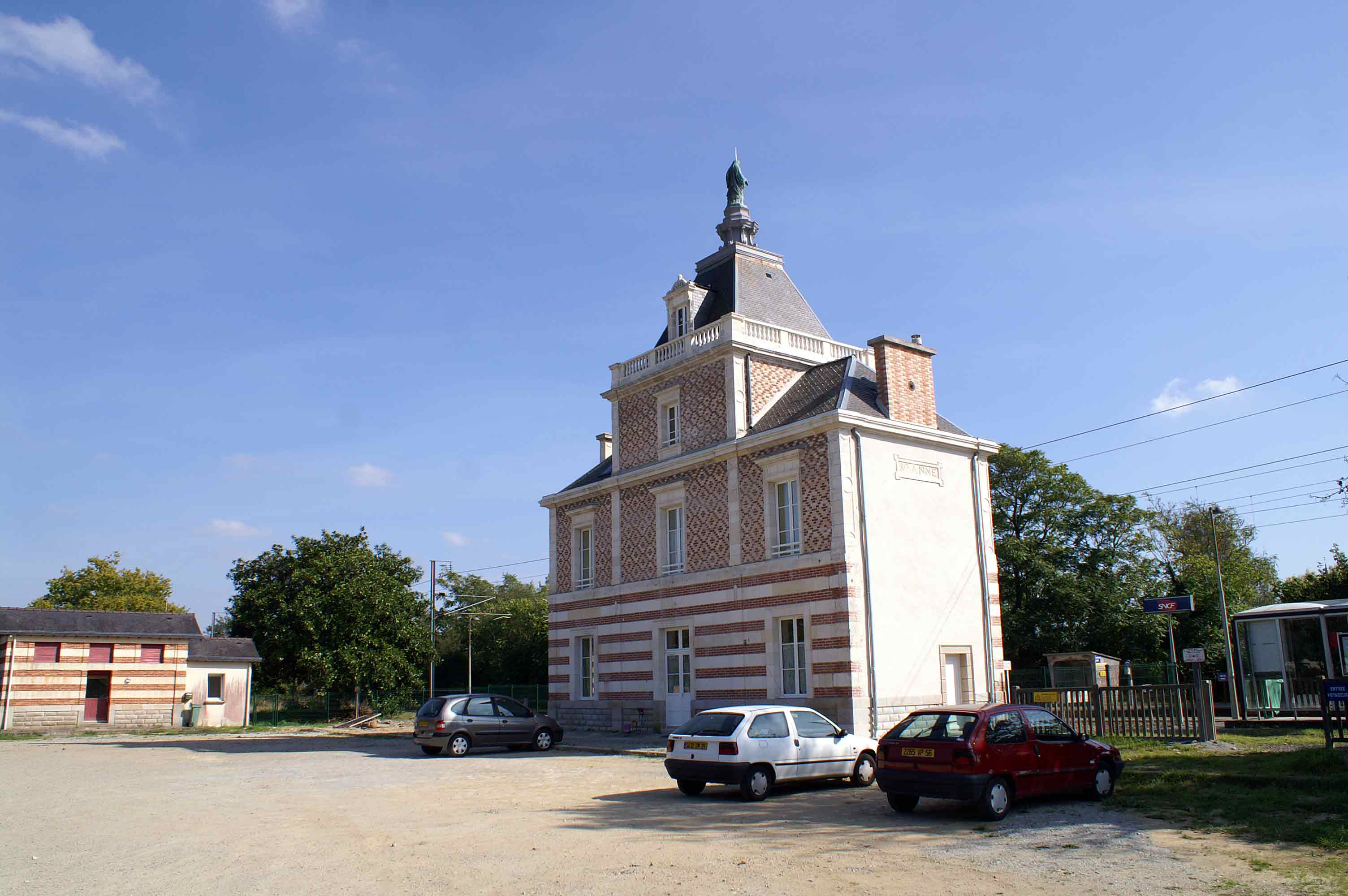
- Sainte-Anne railway station

General information
- Location: Pluneret, Morbihan, Brittany, France
- Coordinates: 47°40′42″N 2°57′38″W
- Line: Savenay–Landerneau railway
- Platforms: 2
- Tracks: 2

Other information
- Station code: 87476648

History
- Opened: 26 September 1862

Services
Preceding station	TER Bretagne	Following station
Auray towards Quimper	19	Vannes Terminus
Location

Sainte-Anne or Sainte-Anne-d'Auray or Sainte-Anne-en-Pluneret is a railway station in Pluneret, Brittany, France. The station was opened on 26 September 1862, and is located on the Savenay–Landerneau railway. The station is served by regional trains to Quimper, Lorient and Vannes.

== Gallery ==
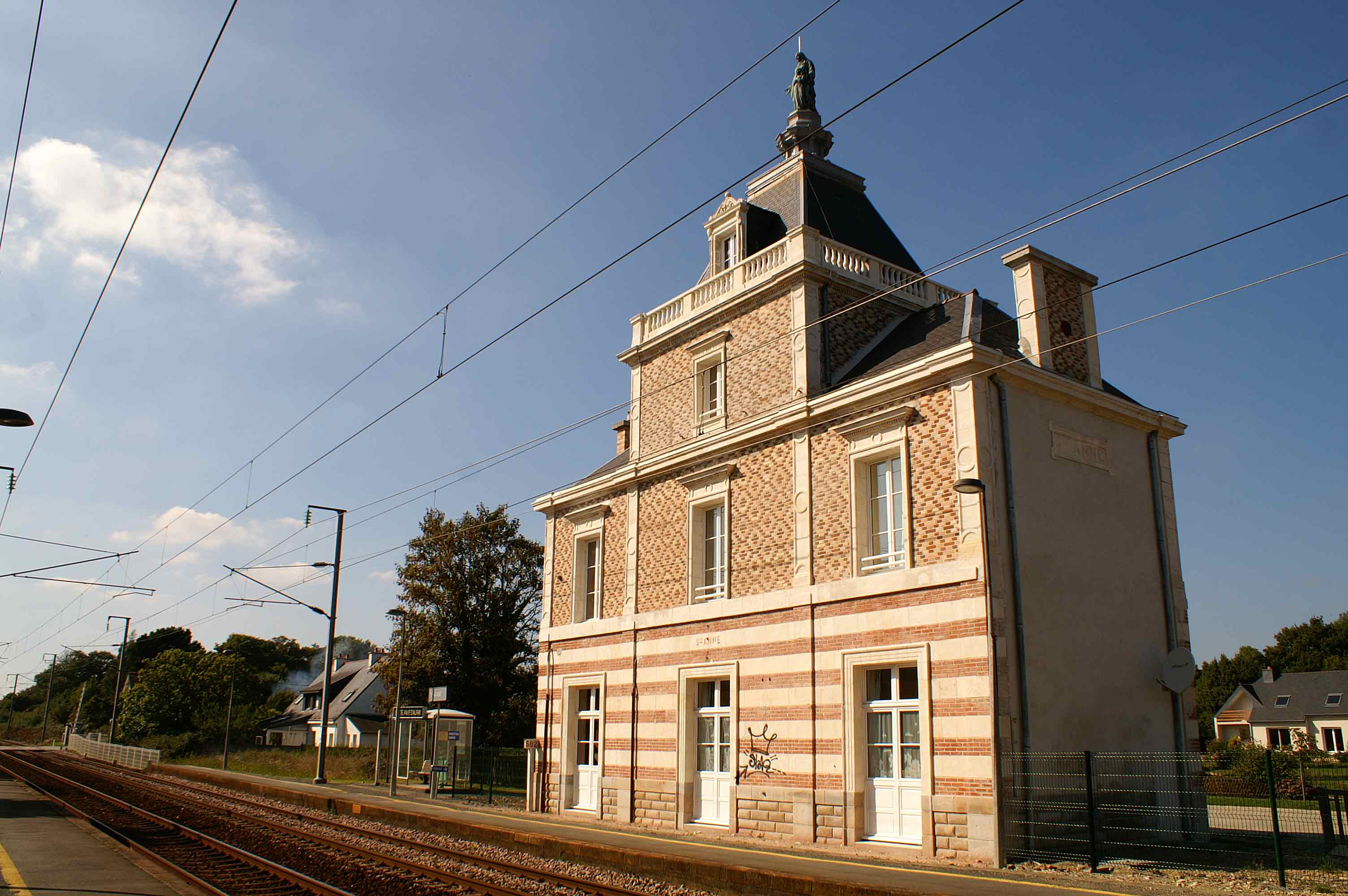
The station.

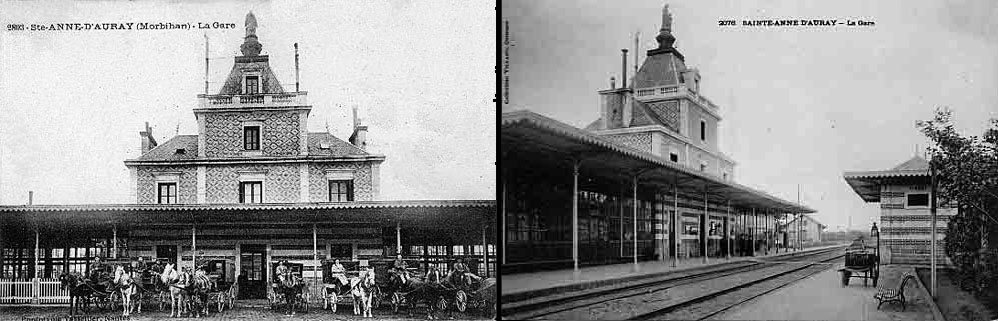
The station in earlier days.

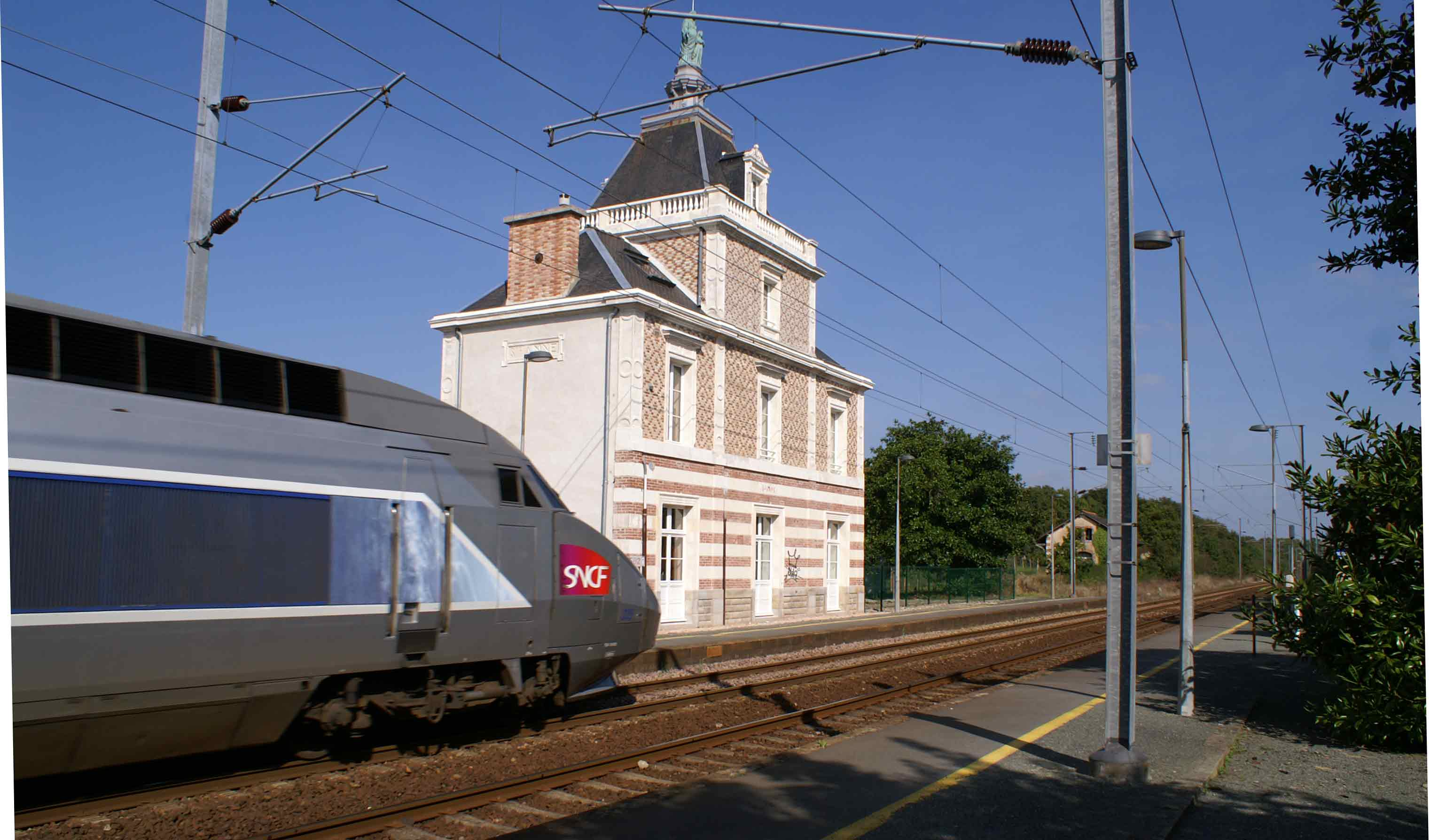
A TGV passing through the station

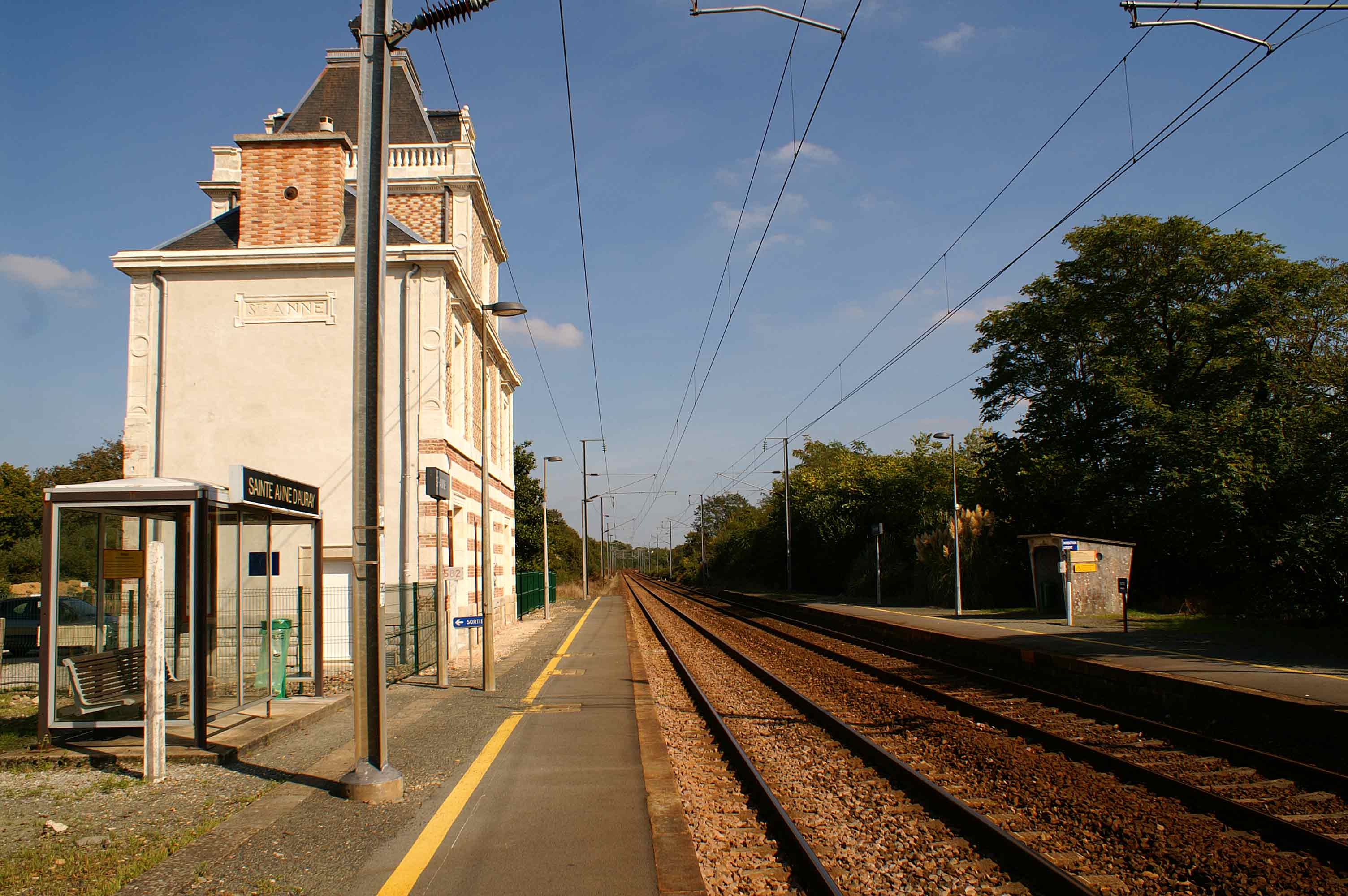
The station
