= Crac'h =

Commune in Brittany, France

Crac'h Krac'h
- Commune
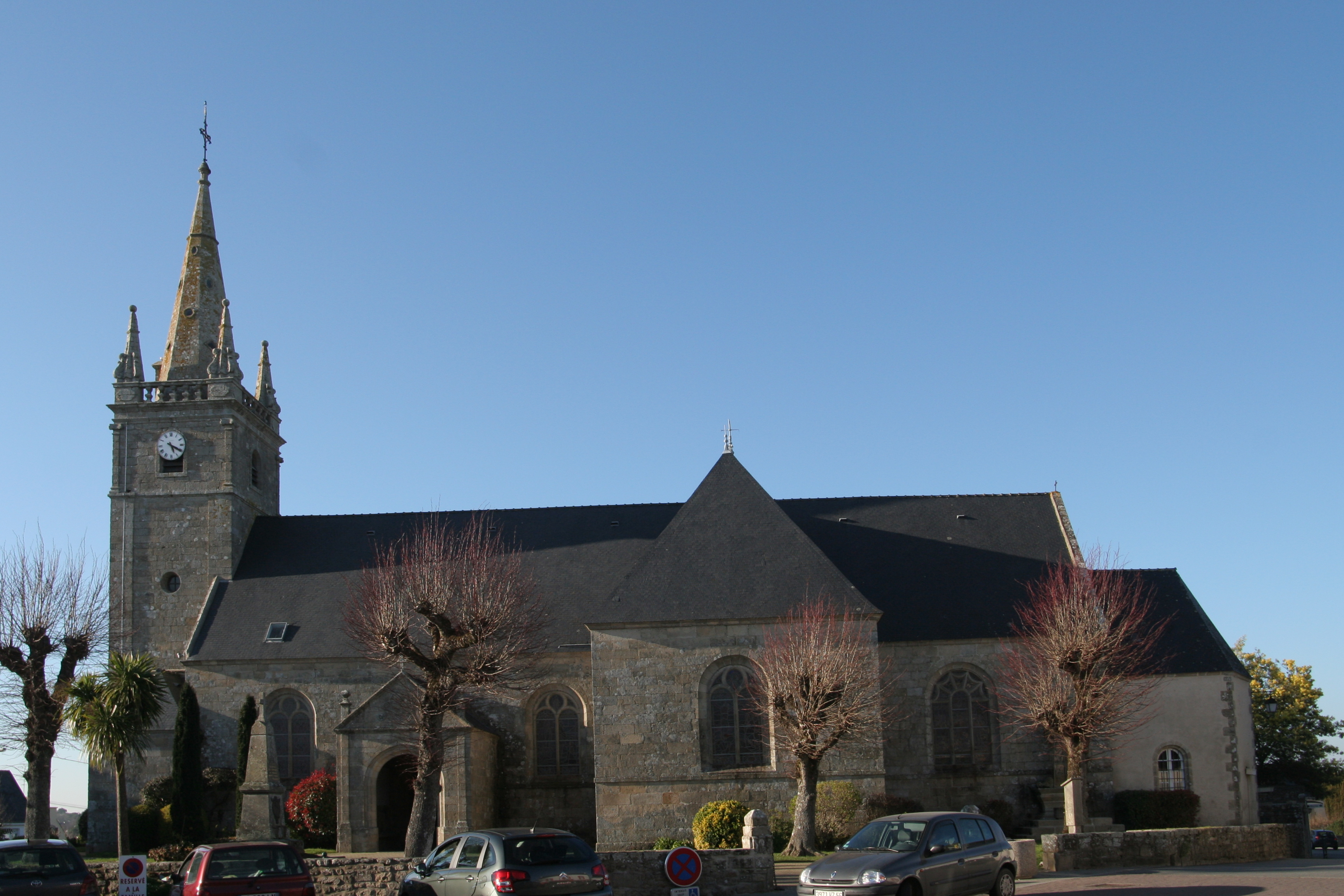
- The church of Saint-Thuriau, in Crac'h

- Coat of arms
- Location of Crac'h
- Location within France Location within Brittany
- Coordinates: 47°37′05″N 3°00′01″W
- Country: France
- Region: Brittany
- Department: Morbihan
- Arrondissement: Lorient
- Canton: Auray
- Intercommunality: Auray Quiberon Terre Atlantique

Government
  - Mayor (2026–32): Ronan Le Délézir
- Area^{1}: 30.54 km^{2} (11.79 sq mi)
- Highest elevation: 44 m (144 ft)
- Lowest elevation: 0 m (0 ft)
- Population (2023): 3,423
  - Density: 112.1/km^{2} (290.3/sq mi)
- Time zone: UTC+01:00 (CET)
  - Summer (DST): UTC+02:00 (CEST)
- INSEE/Postal code: 56046 /56950
- ^{1} French Land Register data, which excludes lakes, ponds, glaciers > 1 km^{2} (0.386 sq mi or 247 acres) and river estuaries.

Crac'h (official French name: Crach, French pronunciation: [kʁak]) or Krac'h in Breton (Breton pronunciation: [krax]) is a commune in the Morbihan department of Brittany in north-western France.

== Population ==
Historical population
Year	Pop.	±% p.a.
1968	1,928	—
1975	2,001	+0.53%
1982	2,535	+3.44%
1990	2,762	+1.08%
1999	3,030	+1.03%
2007	3,260	+0.92%
2012	3,285	+0.15%
2017	3,339	+0.33%
2023	3,423	+0.41%
Source: INSEE

Inhabitants of Crac'h are called in French Crachois and in Breton Krac'hiz.

== See also ==
- Communes of the Morbihan department
