= Pluvigner =

Pluvigner Pleuwigner
- Commune
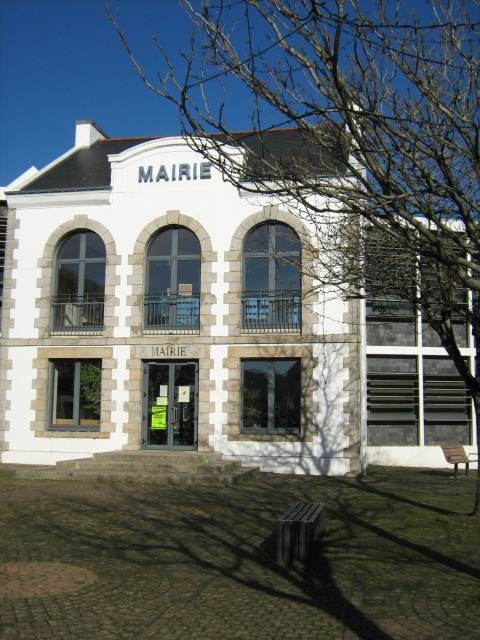
- The town hall in Pluvigner

- Coat of arms
- Location of Pluvigner
- Location within France Location within Brittany
- Coordinates: 47°46′00″N 3°01′00″W
- Country: France
- Region: Brittany
- Department: Morbihan
- Arrondissement: Lorient
- Canton: Pluvigner
- Intercommunality: Auray Quiberon Terre Atlantique

Government
  - Mayor (2026–32): Aurélie Rio
- Area^{1}: 82.83 km^{2} (31.98 sq mi)
- Highest elevation: 146 m (479 ft)
- Lowest elevation: 17 m (56 ft)
- Population (2023): 7,682
  - Density: 92.74/km^{2} (240.2/sq mi)
- Time zone: UTC+01:00 (CET)
  - Summer (DST): UTC+02:00 (CEST)
- INSEE/Postal code: 56177 /56330
- ^{1} French Land Register data, which excludes lakes, ponds, glaciers > 1 km^{2} (0.386 sq mi or 247 acres) and river estuaries.

Pluvigner (French pronunciation: [plyviɲe]; Breton: Pleuwigner) is a commune in the Morbihan department of Brittany in north-western France.

== Demographics ==
Inhabitants of Pluvigner are called in French Pluvignois.

Historical population
Year	Pop.	±% p.a.
1968	4,494	—
1975	4,537	+0.14%
1982	4,725	+0.58%
1990	4,872	+0.38%
1999	5,428	+1.21%
2007	6,569	+2.41%
2012	7,212	+1.89%
2017	7,543	+0.90%
2023	7,682	+0.30%
Source: INSEE

== Town centre ==
At the centre of Pluvigner is L'Eglise St Guigner, near which two main squares form the principal shopping district. There are three bakeries, two butchers, clothes shops, a post office, a florist and three bars in the centre. A Super U and Lidl supermarket can be found on the outskirts. There is also a sports complex with football and rugby pitches, tennis courts and a gym.

== Breton language ==
The municipality launched a linguistic plan through Ya d'ar brezhoneg on 9 November 2006.

In 2008, 9.66% of the children attended the bilingual schools in primary education.

== Modern History ==
From 1687 to 1688, violence occurred in Pluvigner against the population of Caquins, supposed descendants of medieval lepers. The people of Pluvigner opposed the authorities who wanted to ban the custom preventing Caquins from burying their dead in the parish cemetery.

The trève of Saint-Bieuzy, which depended under the Ancien Régime on the parish of Pluvigner, became a commune in 1793, but this was incorporated into that of Pluvigner before 1806.

== Twin towns ==
The town is twinned with Cahirciveen, County Kerry, Ireland (Republic of Ireland) since 1984.

== See also ==
- Communes of the Morbihan department
