= Camors =

Commune in Brittany, France

Camors Kamorzh
- Commune
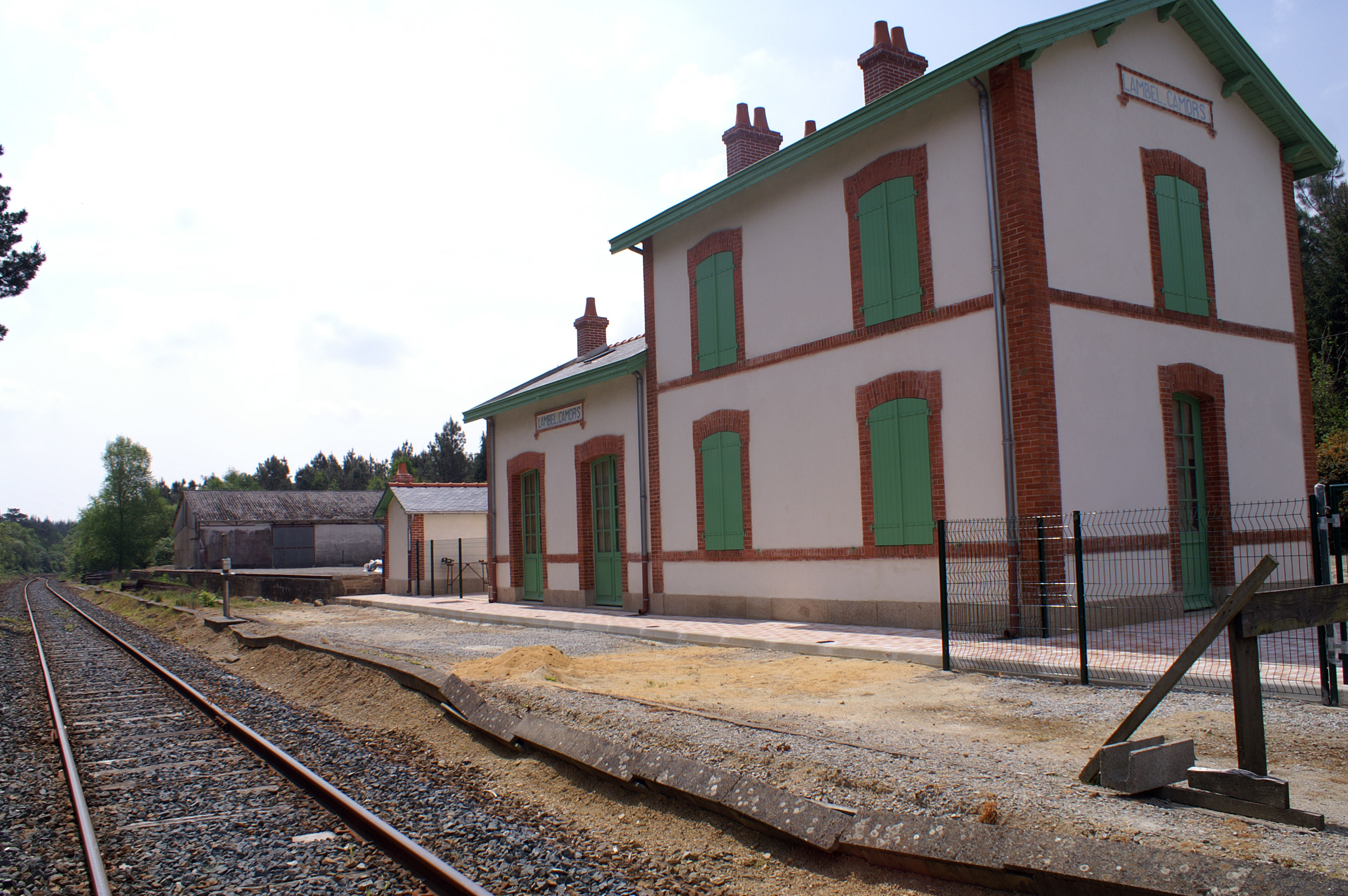
- The Lambel - Camors railway station

- Coat of arms
- Location of Camors
- Location within France Location within Brittany
- Coordinates: 47°50′55″N 2°59′59″W
- Country: France
- Region: Brittany
- Department: Morbihan
- Arrondissement: Lorient
- Canton: Pluvigner
- Intercommunality: Auray Quiberon Terre Atlantique

Government
  - Mayor (2026–32): Christelle Jaffré-Danet
- Area^{1}: 37.09 km^{2} (14.32 sq mi)
- Highest elevation: 137 m (449 ft)
- Lowest elevation: 27 m (89 ft)
- Population (2023): 3,260
  - Density: 87.9/km^{2} (228/sq mi)
- Time zone: UTC+01:00 (CET)
  - Summer (DST): UTC+02:00 (CEST)
- INSEE/Postal code: 56031 /56330
- ^{1} French Land Register data, which excludes lakes, ponds, glaciers > 1 km^{2} (0.386 sq mi or 247 acres) and river estuaries.

Camors (French pronunciation: [kamɔʁ]; Breton: Kamorzh) is a commune in the Morbihan department of Brittany in north-western France.

== Geography ==
The village is situated in the heart of a forest-covered region called the Landes de Lanvaux. The village centre is located 24 km (15 mi) south of Pontivy, 28 km (17 mi) northwest of Vannes, and 29 km (18 mi) northeast of Lorient. With the River Tarun, its main tributary, the Ével forms the commune's northern border. The village centre is surrounded by the forest of Floranges and the national forest of Camors. Apart from the village centre, there are the village of Lambel-Camors and the village of Locoal-Camors and several hamlets.

== Demographics ==
Inhabitants of Camors are called in French Camoriens.

Historical population

Year	Pop.	±% p.a.
1793	1,814	—
1800	1,682	−1.07%
1806	1,526	−1.61%
1821	1,715	+0.78%
1831	1,832	+0.66%
1836	1,953	+1.29%
1841	2,007	+0.55%
1846	2,140	+1.29%
1851	2,100	−0.38%
1856	2,040	−0.58%
1861	2,086	+0.45%
1866	2,196	+1.03%
1872	2,168	−0.21%
1876	2,210	+0.48%
1881	2,322	+0.99%
1886	2,384	+0.53%
1891	2,512	+1.05%
1896	2,553	+0.32%
1901	2,603	+0.39%

Year	Pop.	±% p.a.
1906	2,697	+0.71%
1911	2,802	+0.77%
1921	2,759	−0.15%
1926	2,894	+0.96%
1931	3,036	+0.96%
1936	2,995	−0.27%
1946	3,018	+0.08%
1954	2,545	−2.11%
1962	2,557	+0.06%
1968	2,436	−0.80%
1975	2,300	−0.82%
1982	2,321	+0.13%
1990	2,375	+0.29%
1999	2,353	−0.10%
2007	2,709	+1.78%
2012	2,910	+1.44%
2017	3,030	+0.81%
2023	3,260	+1.23%

Source: EHESS and INSEE (1968-2023)

== Map ==
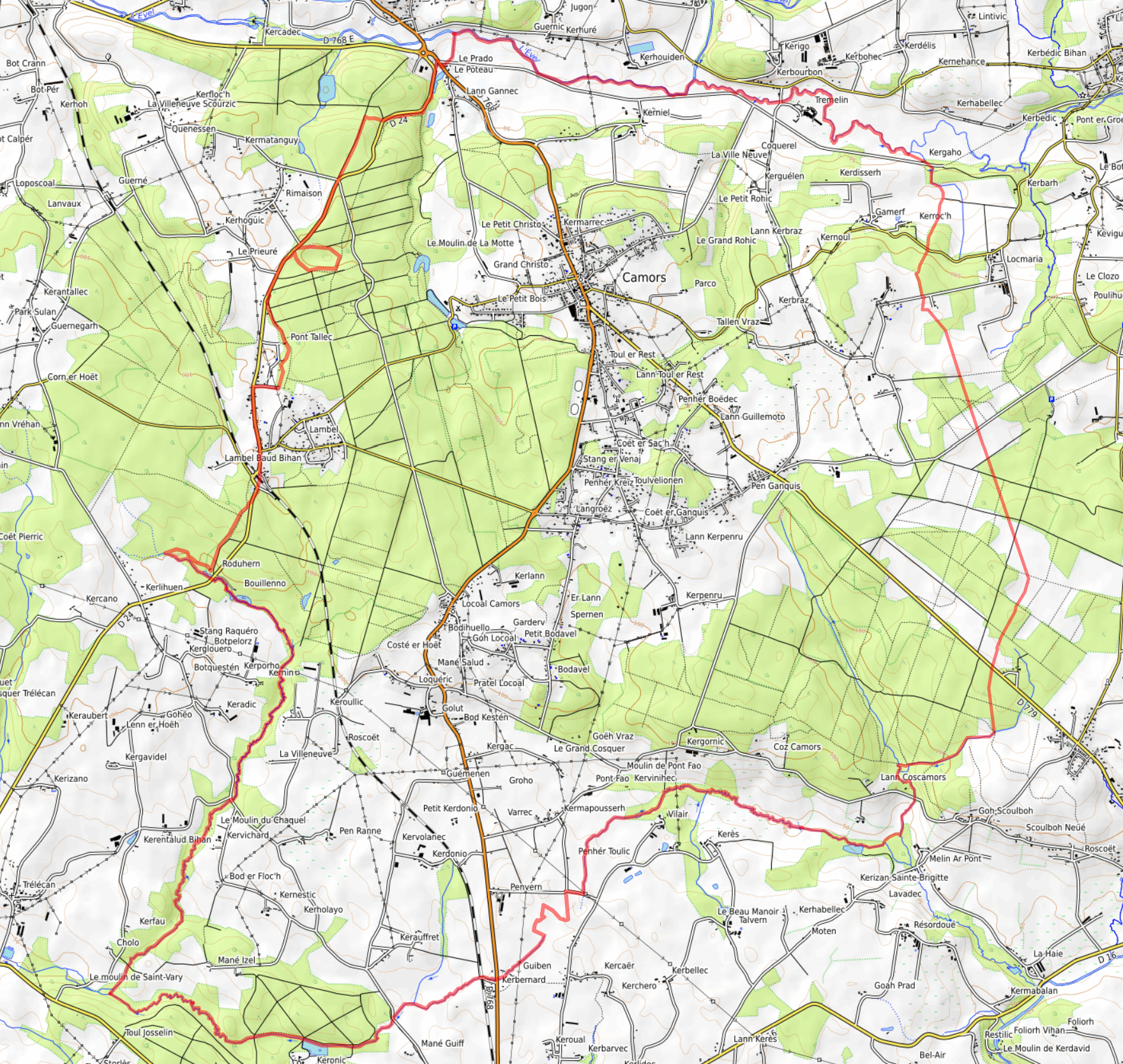
Topographic map

== History ==
In the past, the inhabitants lived off the resources of the forest; they were clog makers, charcoal makers, sawyers, woodcutters...The last clogmaker in Morbihan lived in Camors.

== Points of interest ==
- Arboretum de Camors

== See also ==
- Communes of the Morbihan department
