= Nostang =

Nostang Lostenk
- Commune
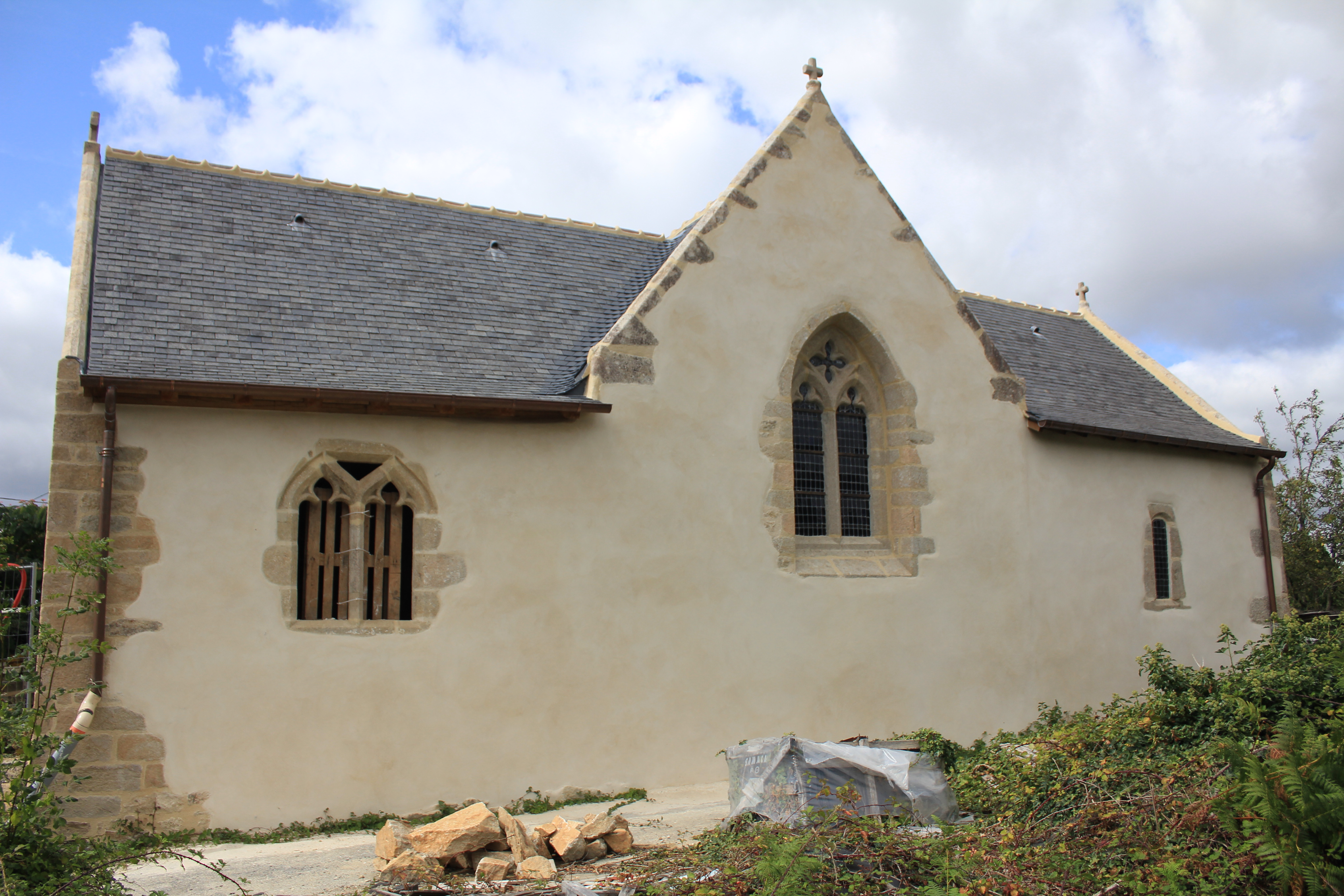
- The Chapel of Locmaria, in Nostang

- Coat of arms
- Location of Nostang
- Location within France Location within Brittany
- Coordinates: 47°45′02″N 3°11′11″W
- Country: France
- Region: Brittany
- Department: Morbihan
- Arrondissement: Lorient
- Canton: Pluvigner
- Intercommunality: Blavet Bellevue Océan

Government
  - Mayor (2026–32): Jean-Pierre Gourden
- Area^{1}: 15.71 km^{2} (6.07 sq mi)
- Highest elevation: 53 m (174 ft)
- Lowest elevation: 0 m (0 ft)
- Population (2023): 1,676
  - Density: 106.7/km^{2} (276.3/sq mi)
- Time zone: UTC+01:00 (CET)
  - Summer (DST): UTC+02:00 (CEST)
- INSEE/Postal code: 56148 /56690
- ^{1} French Land Register data, which excludes lakes, ponds, glaciers > 1 km^{2} (0.386 sq mi or 247 acres) and river estuaries.

Nostang (French pronunciation: [nɔstɑ̃]; Breton: Lostenk) is a commune in the Morbihan department of Brittany in north-western France. Inhabitants of Nostang are called in French Nostangais.

== See also ==
- Communes of the Morbihan department
