= Gâvres =

Commune in Brittany, France

Gâvres Gavr
- Commune
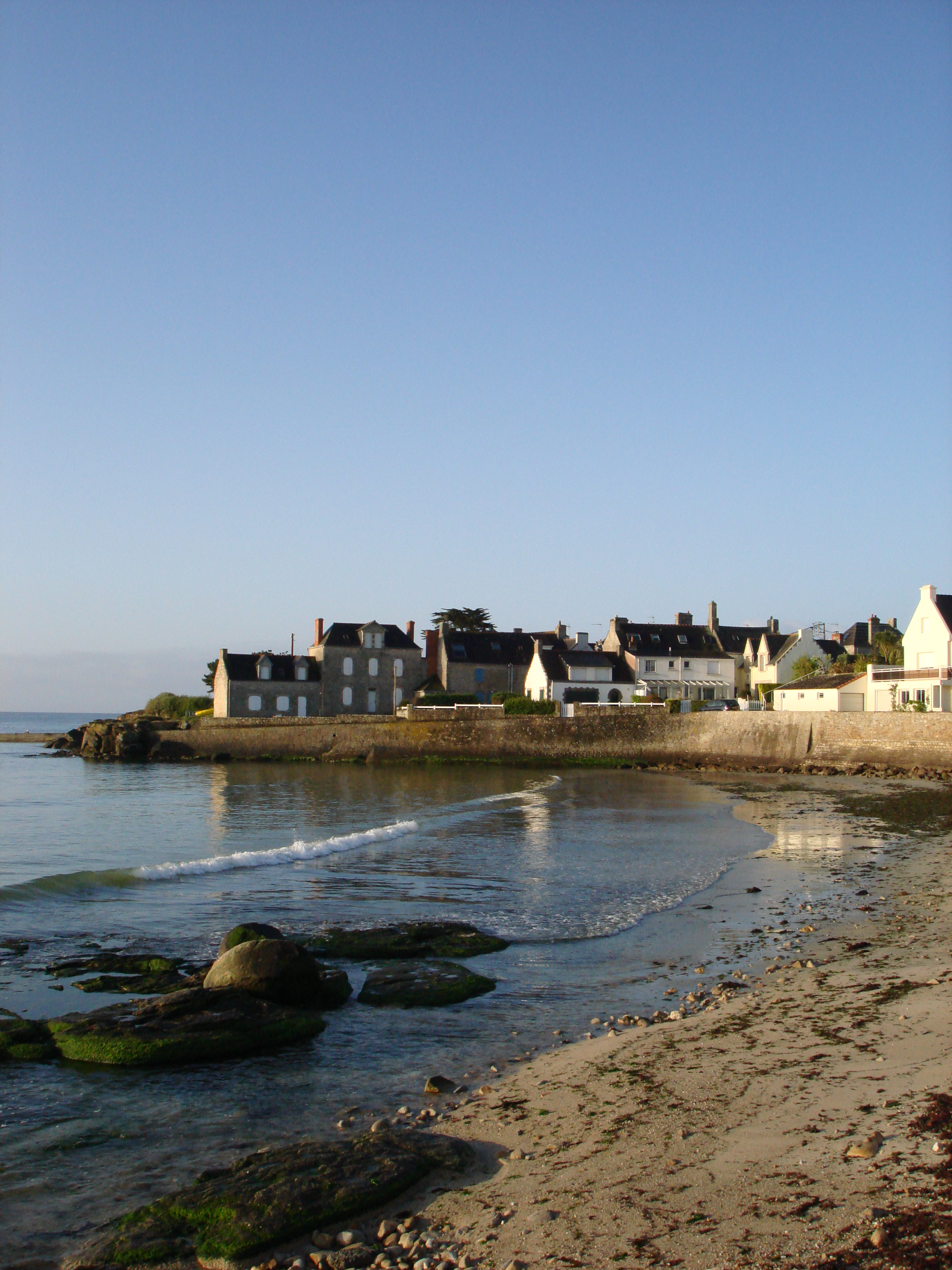
- The beach at Gâvres

- Coat of arms
- Location of Gâvres
- Location within France Location within Brittany
- Coordinates: 47°41′23″N 3°21′15″W
- Country: France
- Region: Brittany
- Department: Morbihan
- Arrondissement: Lorient
- Canton: Pluvigner
- Intercommunality: Lorient Agglomération

Government
  - Mayor (2026–32): Guy Danic
- Area^{1}: 1.88 km^{2} (0.73 sq mi)
- Highest elevation: 10 m (33 ft)
- Lowest elevation: 0 m (0 ft)
- Population (2023): 696
  - Density: 370/km^{2} (959/sq mi)
- Time zone: UTC+01:00 (CET)
  - Summer (DST): UTC+02:00 (CEST)
- INSEE/Postal code: 56062 /56680
- ^{1} French Land Register data, which excludes lakes, ponds, glaciers > 1 km^{2} (0.386 sq mi or 247 acres) and river estuaries.

Gâvres (French pronunciation: [ɡavʁ]; Breton: Gavr) is a commune in the Morbihan department of Brittany in north-western France. French Navy Minister Hyde de Neuville chose this place as a military testing area in 1829 for heavy marine ordnance. The extensive experiments performed at sea have later provided part of the data upon which Hugoniot's theory is based.

== Demographics ==
Inhabitants of Gâvres are called in French Gâvrais.

== See also ==
- Communes of the Morbihan department
