= Sainte-Hélène, Morbihan =

Sainte-Hélène Santez-Elen
- Commune
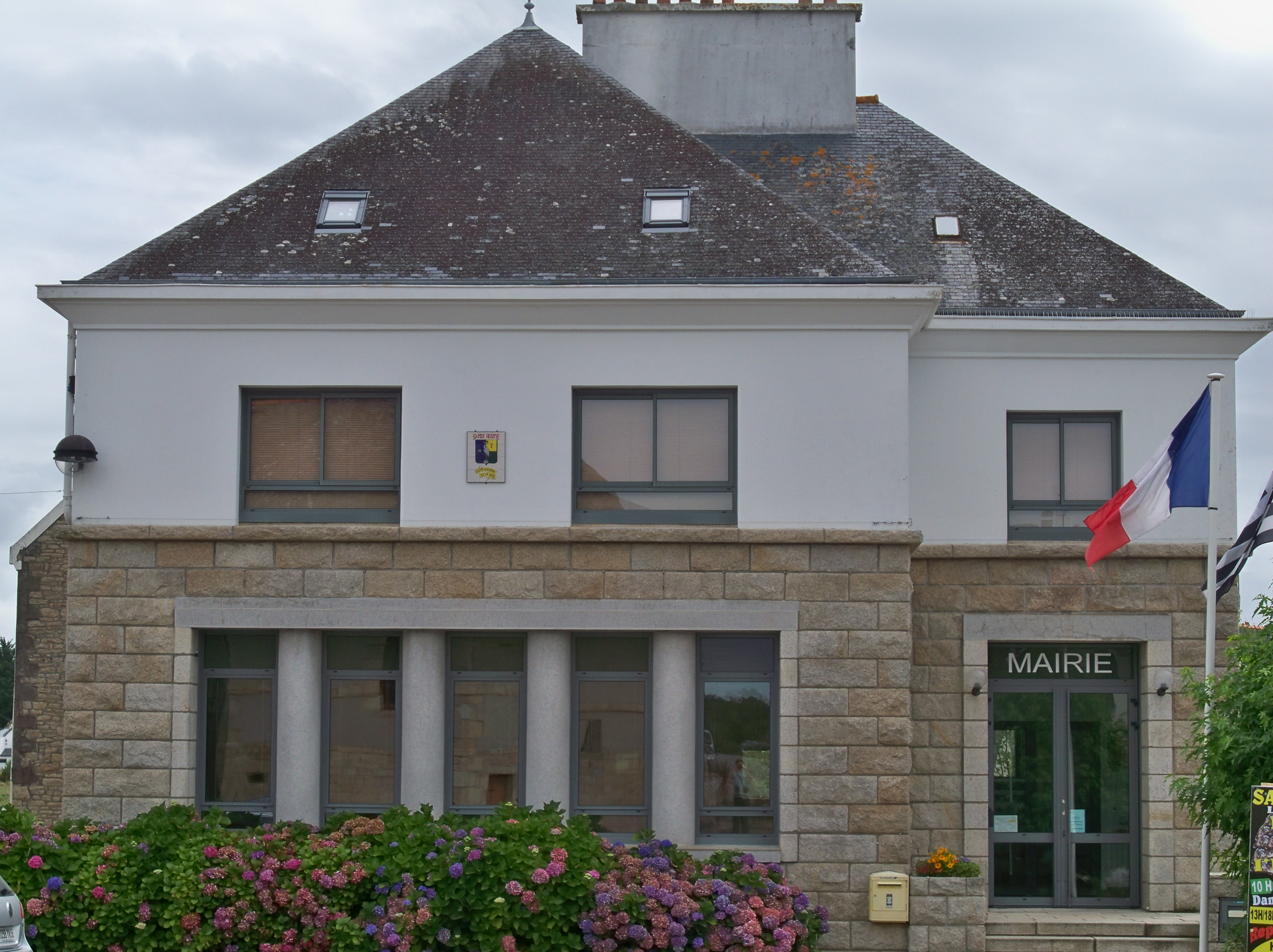
- The town hall in Sainte-Hélène

- Coat of arms
- Location of Sainte-Hélène
- Location within France Location within Brittany
- Coordinates: 47°43′15″N 3°12′12″W
- Country: France
- Region: Brittany
- Department: Morbihan
- Arrondissement: Lorient
- Canton: Pluvigner
- Intercommunality: Blavet Bellevue Océan

Government
  - Mayor (2026–32): Christèle Perrel
- Area^{1}: 8.08 km^{2} (3.12 sq mi)
- Highest elevation: 20 m (66 ft)
- Lowest elevation: 0 m (0 ft)
- Population (2023): 1,303
  - Density: 161/km^{2} (418/sq mi)
- Time zone: UTC+01:00 (CET)
  - Summer (DST): UTC+02:00 (CEST)
- INSEE/Postal code: 56220 /56700
- ^{1} French Land Register data, which excludes lakes, ponds, glaciers > 1 km^{2} (0.386 sq mi or 247 acres) and river estuaries.

Sainte-Hélène (French pronunciation: [sɛ̃t elɛn]; Breton: Santez-Elen) is a commune in the Morbihan department of Brittany in north-western France. Inhabitants of Sainte-Hélène are called in French Hélénois.

== Economy ==
The area is primarily an agricultural community, but also relies increasingly on the tourist industry, offering a range of 'gîte' accommodation and attracting visitors to the Étel estuary area.

== See also ==
- Communes of the Morbihan department
