= Jean-Michel Jacques =

French politician (born 1968)

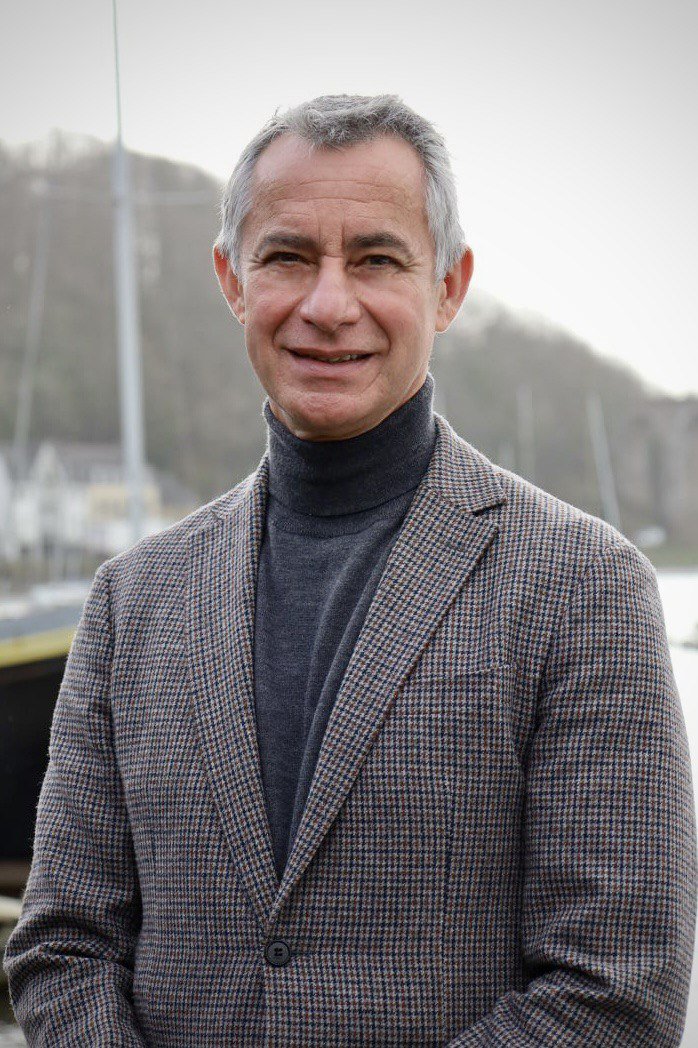
- Jacques in Hennebont, 2022

Member of the National Assembly for Morbihan's 6th constituency
- Incumbent
- Assumed office 21 June 2017
- Preceded by: Philippe Noguès

Mayor of Brandérion
- In office 28 March 2014 – 10 July 2017
- Preceded by: Hubert de Lageneste
- Succeeded by: Jean-Yves Carrio

Personal details
- Born: 29 February 1968 (age 58) Metz, France
- Party: Renaissance
- Occupation: Military nurse

Jean-Michel Jacques (French pronunciation: [ʒɑ̃miʃɛl ʒak]; born 29 February 1968) is a French politician who has represented the 6th constituency of the Morbihan department in the National Assembly since 2017. A member of Renaissance (RE, formerly La République En Marche!), he has presided over the National Assembly National Defence and Armed Forces Committee since 2024. Jacques is a former military nurse with French Navy special forces, under the Special Operations Command.

== Early life and career ==
Born in 1968 in Metz, Jacques grew up in Hagondange, a small town nearby, in Moselle. In 1988, at 18 years-old, he joined the French Navy; he specialised in military nursing, later passing selection for the Commandos Marine, the Special Operation Forces of the Navy. Jacques served for a total of 23 years with the Navy, also being a volunteer firefighter in Morbihan.

Following his retirement from the Navy, he kept working as a nurse. From 2014 to 2017, he held the mayorship of Brandérion, a small town northeast of Lorient, as a political independent.

In the 2017 legislative election, Jacques was elected to the National Assembly as a member of La République En Marche! in the 6th constituency of Morbihan. He was reelected in 2022 and 2024.

As a parliamentarian Jacques took office as deputy-president of the National Assembly Committee on National Defence and the Armed Forces, a member of the OSCE Parliamentary Assembly, as well as presided over the "Major crisis and risks management" study group.

On 20 July 2024, he was elected president of the Committee on National Defence and the Armed Forces, succeeding Thomas Gassilloud.

== See also ==
- 2017 French legislative election
