= Saint-Philibert, Morbihan =

Saint-Philibert Sant-Filiberzh
- Commune
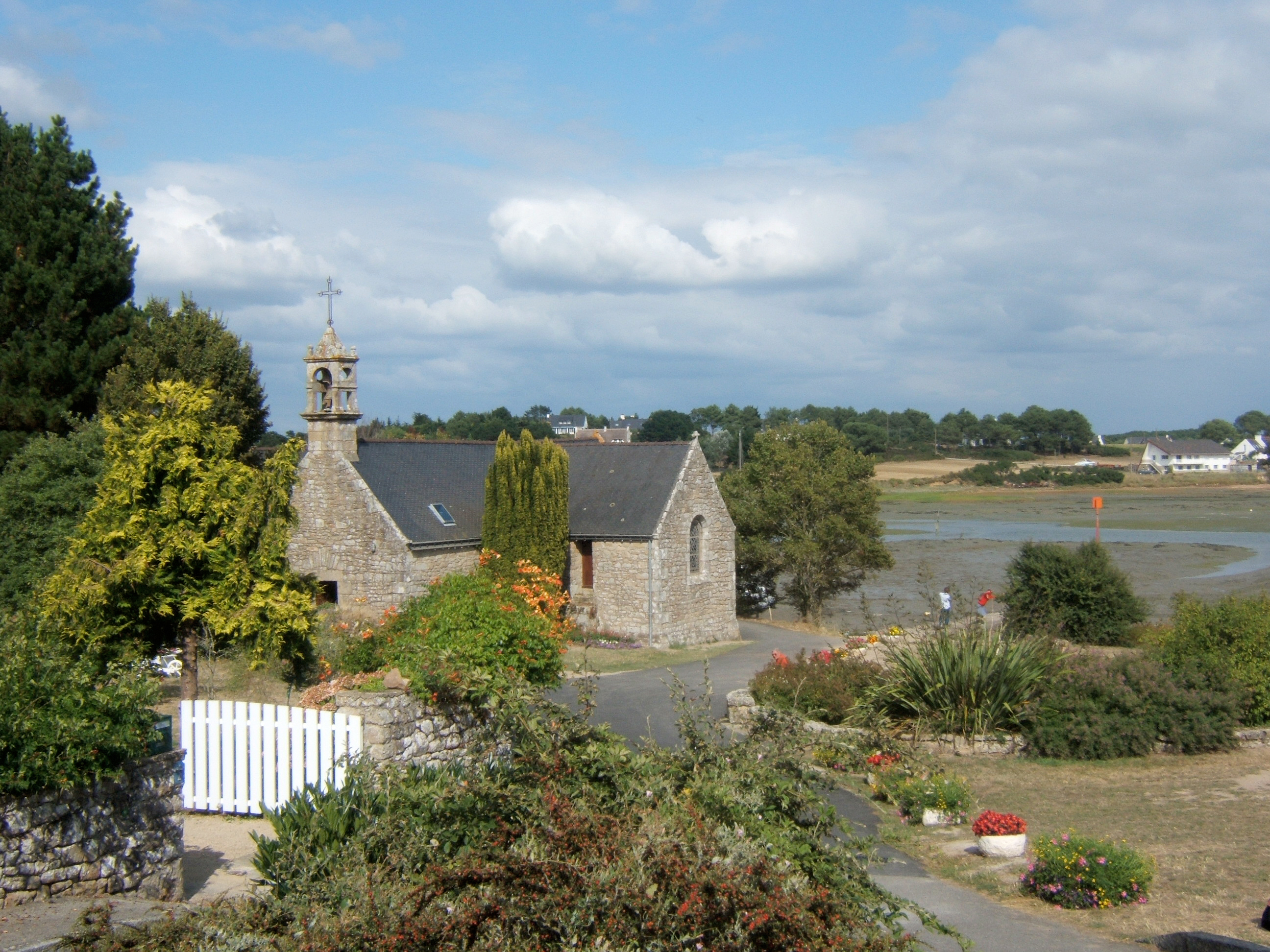
- The church in Saint-Philibert

- Coat of arms
- Location of Saint-Philibert
- Location within France Location within Brittany
- Coordinates: 47°35′15″N 2°59′56″W
- Country: France
- Region: Brittany
- Department: Morbihan
- Arrondissement: Lorient
- Canton: Auray
- Intercommunality: Auray Quiberon Terre Atlantique

Government
  - Mayor (2026–32): François Le Cotillec
- Area^{1}: 7.05 km^{2} (2.72 sq mi)
- Highest elevation: 26 m (85 ft)
- Lowest elevation: 0 m (0 ft)
- Population (2023): 1,575
  - Density: 223/km^{2} (579/sq mi)
- Time zone: UTC+01:00 (CET)
  - Summer (DST): UTC+02:00 (CEST)
- INSEE/Postal code: 56233 /56470
- ^{1} French Land Register data, which excludes lakes, ponds, glaciers > 1 km^{2} (0.386 sq mi or 247 acres) and river estuaries.

Saint-Philibert (French pronunciation: [sɛ̃ filibɛʁ]; Breton: Sant-Filiberzh) is a commune in the Morbihan department of Brittany in north-western France. Inhabitants of Saint-Philibert are called in French Saint-Philibertains.

== See also ==
- Communes of the Morbihan department
