= Jacques Le Nay =

French politician

Senator for Morbihan
- Incumbent
- Assumed office 1 October 2017

Deputy for Morbihan's 6th constituency in the National Assembly of France
- In office 2 April 1993 – 19 June 2012
- Preceded by: Jean Giovannelli (PS)
- Succeeded by: Philippe Noguès (PS)

General councillor of Morbihan
- In office 3 October 1988 – 18 March 2001
- Preceded by: Yves Le Cabellec (UDF)
- Succeeded by: Michel Poulin (DVD)
- Constituency: Canton of Plouay

Mayor of Plouay
- In office 20 March 1989 – 21 October 2017
- Preceded by: Yves Le Cabellec
- Succeeded by: Gwen Le Nay

Personal details
- Born: November 19, 1949 (age 75); Plouay

Jacques Le Nay (born 19 November 1949 in Plouay) is a French senator, representing the Morbihan department. From 1993 to 2012 he was the deputy for Morbihan's 6th constituency in the National Assembly of France, as a member of the Union for a Popular Movement. From 1989 to 2017 he was Mayor of Plouay, and from 1988 to 2001 he was a General councillor of Morbihan.
