= Arboretum de Camors =

Arboretum in Morbihan, Brittany, France

Coordinates: 47.8486°N 2.9997°W

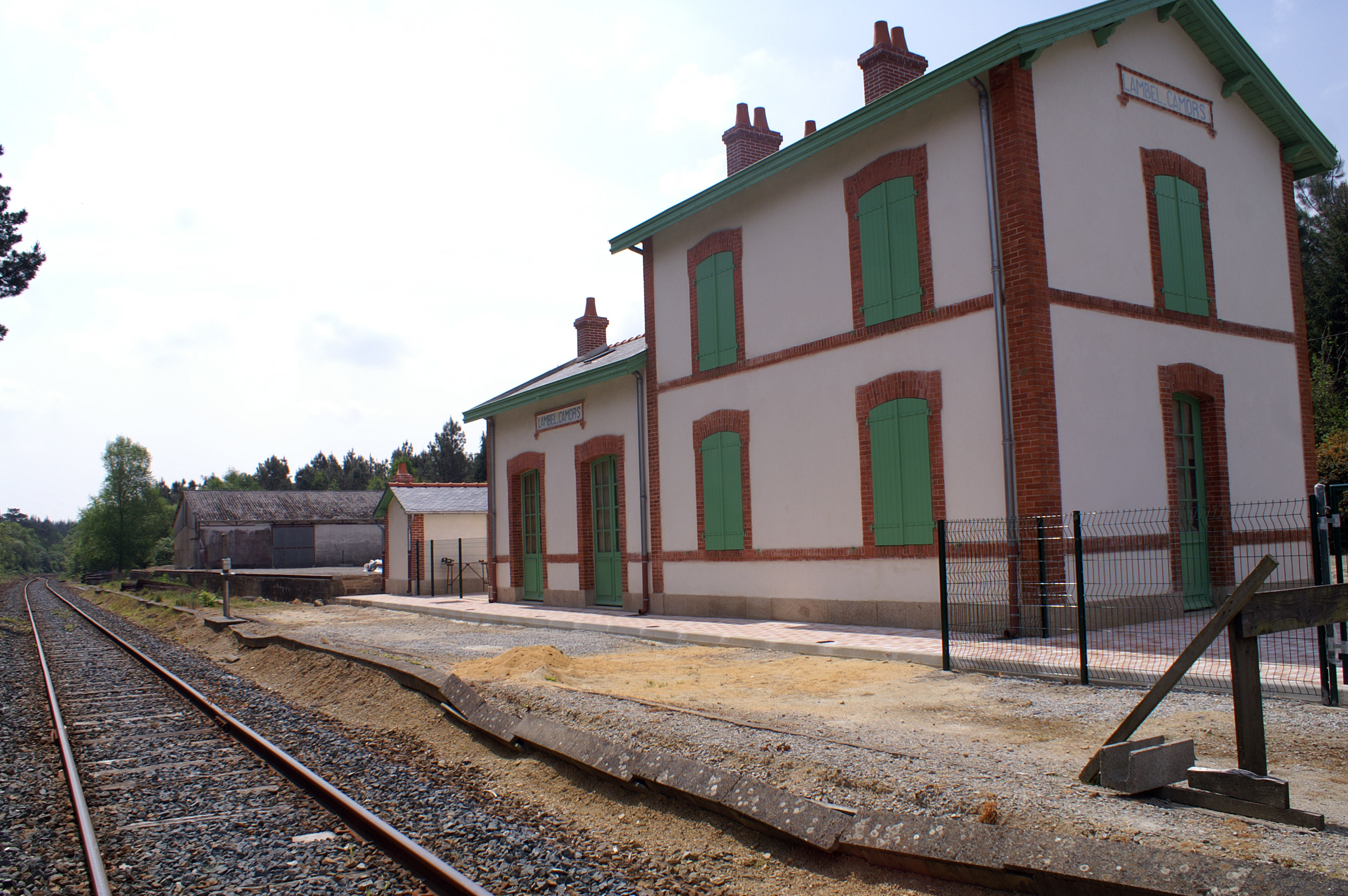

The Arboretum de Camors (Breton: Arboretum Kanmoroù) (1 hectare) is an arboretum located within the Forêt Domaniale de Camors at Lambel, Camors, Morbihan, Bretagne, France. It is open daily without charge.

The arboretum appears to have been created before 1945 along the railroad tracks that pass Lambel, where the Office National des Forêts planted 74 conifer varieties. Today, some have disappeared and many others were damaged by a storm in October 1987. The arboretum appears to be in decay and used primarily as a walking path.

== See also ==
- List of botanical gardens in France
