= Landévant =

Commune in Brittany, France

Landévant Landevant
- Commune
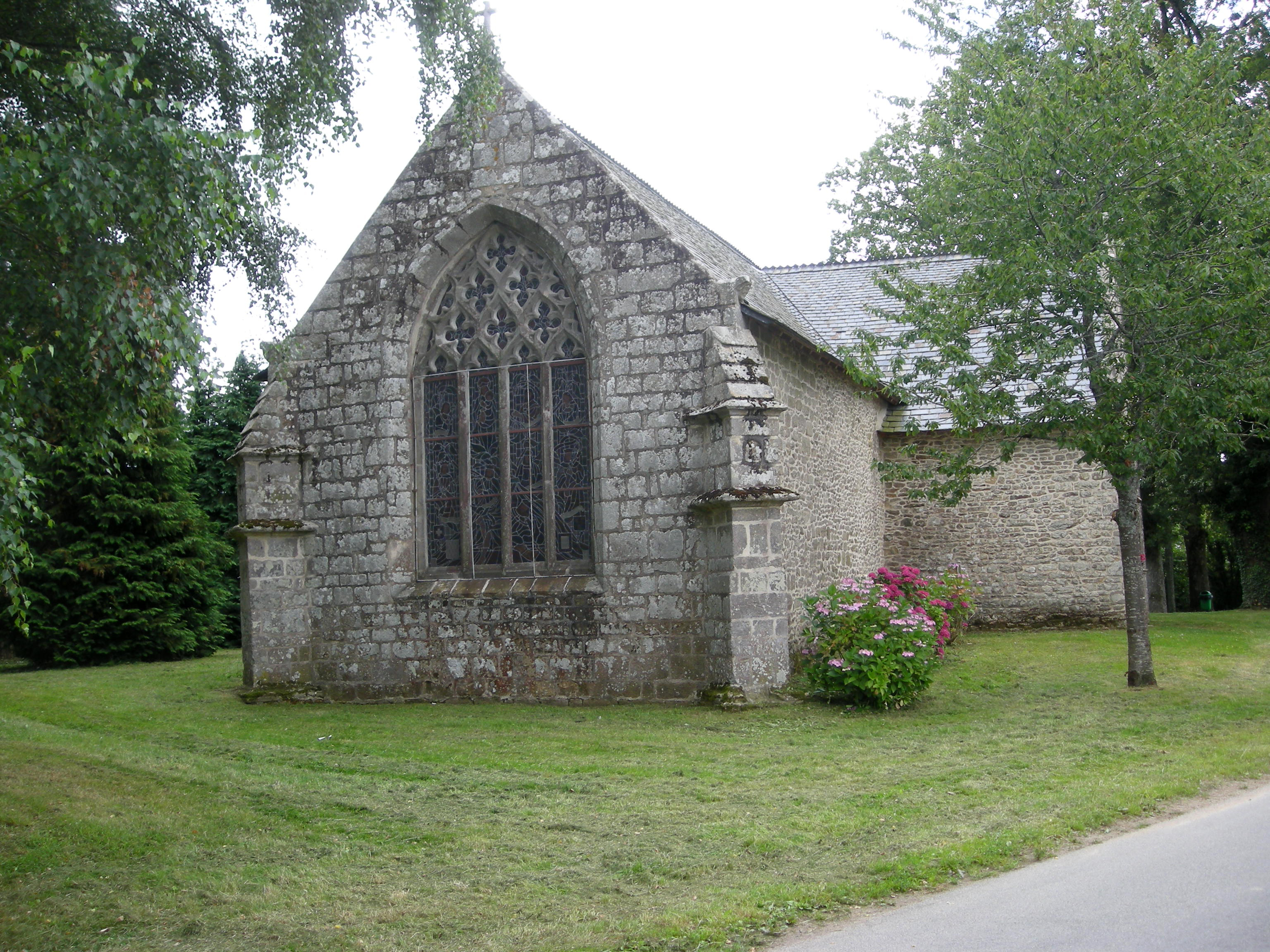
- The chapel of Locmaria-er-Hoët

- Coat of arms
- Location of Landévant
- Location within France Location within Brittany
- Coordinates: 47°45′55″N 3°07′14″W
- Country: France
- Region: Brittany
- Department: Morbihan
- Arrondissement: Lorient
- Canton: Pluvigner
- Intercommunality: Auray Quiberon Terre Atlantique

Government
  - Mayor (2026–32): Pascal Le Calve
- Area^{1}: 22.34 km^{2} (8.63 sq mi)
- Highest elevation: 80 m (260 ft)
- Lowest elevation: 0 m (0 ft)
- Population (2023): 4,056
  - Density: 181.6/km^{2} (470.2/sq mi)
- Time zone: UTC+01:00 (CET)
  - Summer (DST): UTC+02:00 (CEST)
- INSEE/Postal code: 56097 /56690
- ^{1} French Land Register data, which excludes lakes, ponds, glaciers > 1 km^{2} (0.386 sq mi or 247 acres) and river estuaries.

Landévant (French pronunciation: [lɑ̃devɑ̃]; Breton: Landevant) is a commune in the Morbihan department of Brittany in north-western France.

== Population ==
Historical population
Year	Pop.	±% p.a.
1968	1,594	—
1975	1,516	−0.71%
1982	1,794	+2.43%
1990	2,083	+1.88%
1999	2,123	+0.21%
2007	2,798	+3.51%
2012	3,407	+4.02%
2017	3,810	+2.26%
2023	4,056	+1.05%
Source: INSEE

Inhabitants of Landévant are called in French Landévantais.

== See also ==
- Communes of the Morbihan department
