= Landaul =

Commune in Brittany, France

Landaul Landaol
- Commune
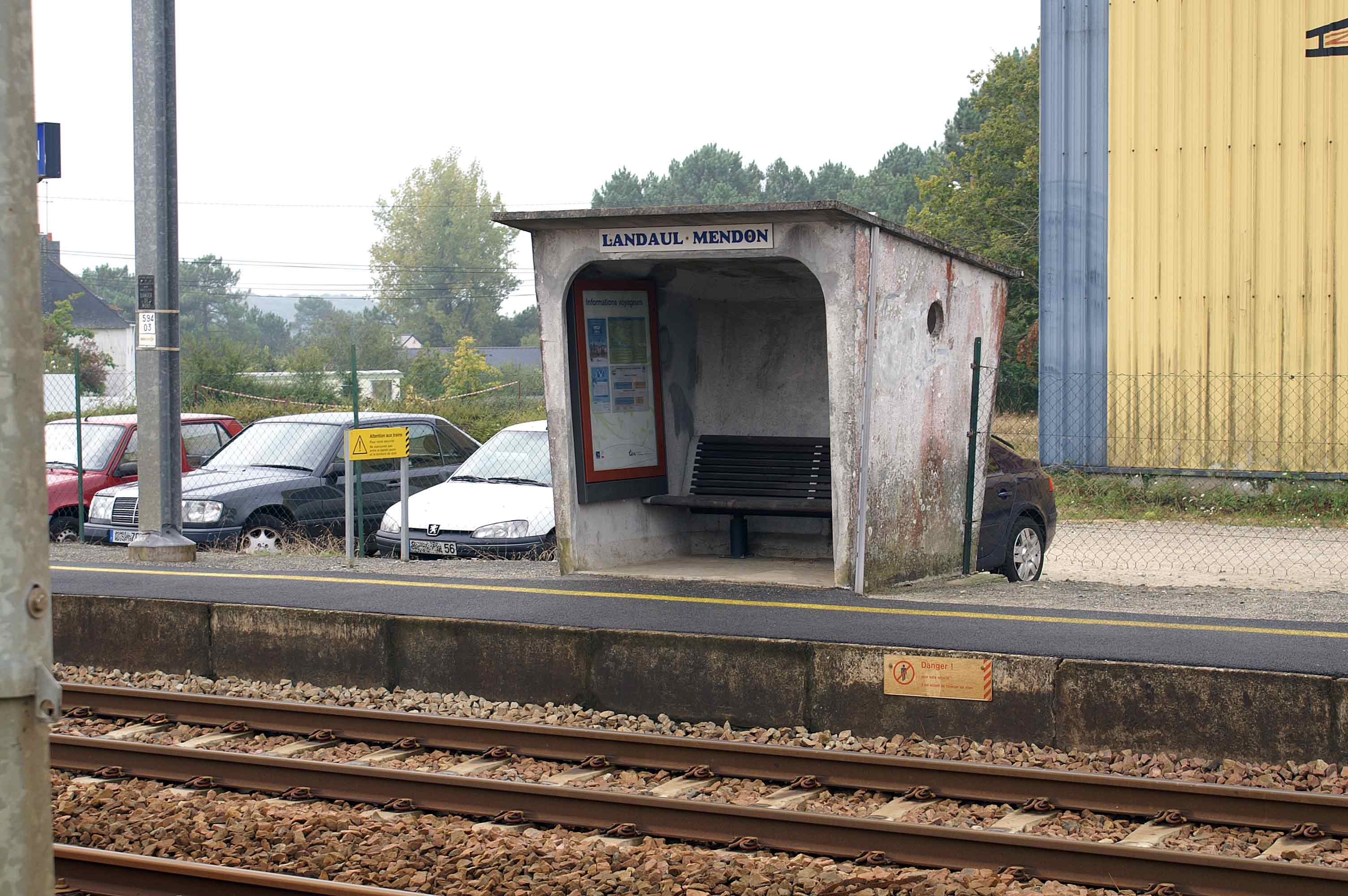
- Landaul-Mendon railway station

- Coat of arms
- Location of Landaul
- Location within France Location within Brittany
- Coordinates: 47°44′57″N 3°04′29″W
- Country: France
- Region: Brittany
- Department: Morbihan
- Arrondissement: Lorient
- Canton: Pluvigner
- Intercommunality: Auray Quiberon Terre Atlantique

Government
  - Mayor (2026–32): Yann Le Gallo
- Area^{1}: 17.35 km^{2} (6.70 sq mi)
- Highest elevation: 66 m (217 ft)
- Lowest elevation: 0 m (0 ft)
- Population (2023): 2,516
  - Density: 145.0/km^{2} (375.6/sq mi)
- Time zone: UTC+01:00 (CET)
  - Summer (DST): UTC+02:00 (CEST)
- INSEE/Postal code: 56096 /56690
- ^{1} French Land Register data, which excludes lakes, ponds, glaciers > 1 km^{2} (0.386 sq mi or 247 acres) and river estuaries.

Landaul (French pronunciation: [lɑ̃dol]; Breton: Landaol) is a commune in the Morbihan department of Brittany in north-western France.

== Population ==
Historical population
Year	Pop.	±% p.a.
1968	1,009	—
1975	1,051	+0.58%
1982	1,147	+1.26%
1990	1,327	+1.84%
1999	1,343	+0.13%
2007	1,789	+3.65%
2012	2,166	+3.90%
2017	2,298	+1.19%
2023	2,516	+1.52%
Source: INSEE

Inhabitants of Landaul are called in French Landaulais.

== See also ==
- Communes of the Morbihan department
