= Merlevenez =

Merlevenez Brelevenez
- Commune
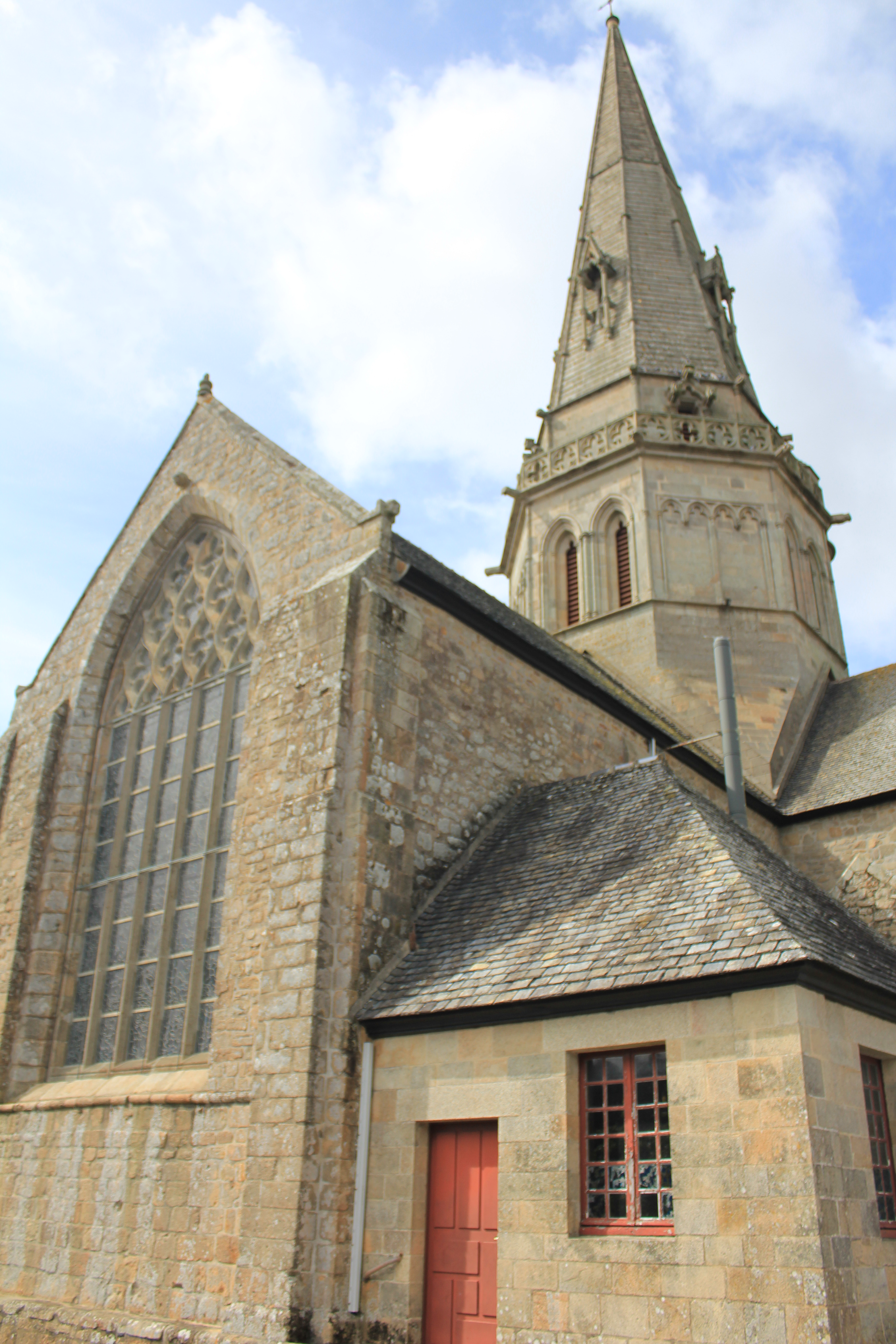
- The church of Our Lady of Joy, in Merlevenez

- Coat of arms
- Location of Merlevenez
- Location within France Location within Brittany
- Coordinates: 47°44′15″N 3°13′56″W
- Country: France
- Region: Brittany
- Department: Morbihan
- Arrondissement: Lorient
- Canton: Pluvigner
- Intercommunality: Blavet Bellevue Océan

Government
  - Mayor (2026–32): Frank Nicolas
- Area^{1}: 17.67 km^{2} (6.82 sq mi)
- Highest elevation: 40 m (130 ft)
- Lowest elevation: 1 m (3.3 ft)
- Population (2023): 3,174
  - Density: 179.6/km^{2} (465.2/sq mi)
- Time zone: UTC+01:00 (CET)
  - Summer (DST): UTC+02:00 (CEST)
- INSEE/Postal code: 56130 /56700
- ^{1} French Land Register data, which excludes lakes, ponds, glaciers > 1 km^{2} (0.386 sq mi or 247 acres) and river estuaries.

Merlevenez (French pronunciation: [mɛʁləvəne]; Breton: Brelevenez) is a commune in the Morbihan department of Brittany in north-western France.

== Population ==
Historical population
Year	Pop.	±% p.a.
1968	1,237	—
1975	1,221	−0.19%
1982	1,769	+5.44%
1990	2,032	+1.75%
1999	2,294	+1.36%
2007	2,896	+2.96%
2012	3,151	+1.70%
2017	3,207	+0.35%
2023	3,174	−0.17%
Source: INSEE

Inhabitants of Merlevenez are called in French Merleveneziens.

== See also ==
- Communes of the Morbihan department
