= Morbihan's 6th constituency =

Constituency of the National Assembly of France

6th constituency of Morbihan
- inline Constituency of the National Assembly of France

- Constituency in Department

- Location of Morbihan in France
- Deputy: Jean-Michel Jacques; RE
- Department: Morbihan
- Cantons: (pre-2015) Cléguérec, Le Faouët, Gourin, Guémené-sur-Scorff, Hennebont, Plouay, Pont-Scorff

The 6th constituency of Morbihan is a French legislative constituency in the Morbihan département. Like the other 576 French constituencies, it elects one MP using the two-round system, with a run-off if no candidate receives over 50% of the vote in the first round.

== Historic representation ==
Election	Member	Party
1988	Jean Giovannelli	PS
1993	Jacques Le Nay	UDF
1997	Jacques Le Nay	UDF
2002	Jacques Le Nay	UMP
2007	Jacques Le Nay	UMP
2012	Philippe Noguès	PS
2017	Jean-Michel Jacques	LREM
2022	Jean-Michel Jacques	RE

== Election results ==
=== 2024 ===
Legislative Election 2024: Morbihan's 6th constituency
Party	Candidate	Votes	%	±%
RE (Ensemble)	Jean-Michel Jacques	21,675	33.08	−1.71
LO	Kelig Lagrée	1,213	1.85	N/A
DLF	Valère Charlery	835	1.27	N/A
LR	Daniel Barach	3,513	5.36	+1.71
RN	Nathalie Guihot-Vieira	22,728	34.69	+13.09
LFI (NFP)	Jean-Michel Baudry	15,561	23.75	−2.33
Turnout		65,525	97.07	+45.22
Registered electors		93,830		
2nd round result
RE	Jean-Michel Jacques	37,983	59.98	+26.90
RN	Nathalie Guihot-Vieira	25,346	40.02	+5.33
Turnout		63,329	94.03	−3.04
Registered electors		93,842		
RE hold		Swing		

=== 2022 ===
Legislative Election 2022: Morbihan's 6th constituency
Party	Candidate	Votes	%	±%
LREM (Ensemble)	Jean-Michel Jacques	16,452	34.79	-0.62
LFI (NUPÉS)	Jean-Michel Baudry	12,335	26.08	+15.97
RN	Aurélie Le Goff	10,213	21.60	+12.81
UDB	Tiphaine Siret	1,980	4.19	N/A
LR (UDC)	Guillaume Kiefer	1,724	3.65	−18.93
REC	Anne Bernard	1,252	2.65	N/A
Others	N/A	3,336	7.05	
Turnout		47,292	51.85	−3.81
2nd round result
LREM (Ensemble)	Jean-Michel Jacques	23,925	54.81	+0.09
LFI (NUPÉS)	Jean-Michel Baudry	19,725	45.19	N/A
Turnout		43,650	50.85	+4.32
LREM hold				

=== 2017 ===
Candidate	Label	First round		Second round	
Candidate	Label	Votes	%	Votes	%
Jean-Michel Jacques	REM	17,450	35.41	20,250	54.72
Gwenn Le Nay	UDI	6,829	13.86	16,755	45.28
Philippe Noguès	DVG	5,273	10.70		
David Guillemet	FI	4,981	10.11		
Yvan Chichery	FN	4,333	8.79		
Anne-Maud Goujon	LR	4,297	8.72		
Christian Derrien	REG	3,724	7.56		
Joël Le Guellec	DLF	691	1.40		
Dominique Yvon	REG	667	1.35		
Kelig Lagree	EXG	499	1.01		
Henri de Bronac	DVD	328	0.67		
Erwan Penin	DIV	213	0.43		
Votes		49,285	100.00	37,005	100.00
Valid votes		49,285	97.62	37,005	87.68
Blank votes		821	1.63	3,551	8.41
Null votes		382	0.76	1,650	3.91
Turnout		50,488	55.66	42,206	46.53
Abstentions		40,215	44.34	48,495	53.47
Registered voters		90,703		90,701	
Source: Ministry of the Interior

=== 2012 ===
Legislative Election 2012: Morbihan's 6th constituency
Party	Candidate	Votes	%	±%
UMP	Jacques Le Nay	20,293	36.27	−13.14
PS	Philippe Nogues	14,229	25.43	−2.19
DVG	Christian Derrien	7,608	13.60	N/A
FG	Gérard Perron	5,024	8.98	−0.77
FN	Ulla Paulat	4,524	8.08	+5.56
EELV	Claire Duval	2,153	3.85	−0.51
Others	N/A	2,126	-	−
Turnout		55,957	62.81	−4.14
2nd round result
PS	Philippe Nogues	28,726	51.48	+6.15
UMP	Jacques Le Nay	27,074	48.52	−6.15
Turnout		55,800	62.65	−3.01
PS gain from UMP				

=== 2007 ===
Legislative Election 2007: Morbihan's 6th constituency
Party	Candidate	Votes	%	±%
UMP	Jacques Le Nay	28,248	49.41	−1.24
PS	Jean-Pierre Bageot	15,791	27.62	−1.04
PCF	Gérard Perron	5,573	9.75	+5.18
LV	Michel Rolland	2,490	4.36	+0.95
FN	Gérald Perrier	1,443	2.52	−3.15
Others	N/A	3,629	-	−
Turnout		58,306	66.95	−2.42
2nd round result
UMP	Jacques Le Nay	30,528	54.67	N/A
PS	Jean-Pierre Bageot	25,311	45.33	N/A
Turnout		57,185	65.66	N/A
UMP hold				

=== 2002 ===
Legislative Election 2002: Morbihan's 6th constituency
Party	Candidate	Votes	%	±%
UMP	Jacques Le Nay	28,773	50.65	N/A
PS	Jean-Pierre Bageot	16,281	28.66	+1.70
FN	Ginette Berthier	3,223	5.67	−1.97
PCF	Marc Cozilis	2,598	4.57	−7.12
LV	Brigitte Sylvestre	1,939	3.41	+0.43
Others	N/A	3,991	-	−
Turnout		57,927	69.37	−3.86
UMP gain from FD				

=== 1997 ===
Legislative Election 1997: Morbihan's 6th constituency
Party	Candidate	Votes	%	±%
FD (UDF)	Jacques Le Nay	18,341	33.05	
PS	Jean-Pierre Bageot	14,963	26.96	
RPR	Michel Morvant*	7,085	12.77	
PCF	Jean Le Borgne	6,485	11.69	
FN	Francis Schwaller	4,242	7.64	
LV	Michel Rolland	1,652	2.98	
GE	Gérard Le Seigneur	1,439	2.59	
REG	Christian Guyonvarc'h	1,287	2.32	
Turnout		57,999	73.23	
2nd round result
FD (UDF)	Jacques Le Nay	29,537	50.62	
PS	Jean-Pierre Bageot	28,817	49.38	
Turnout		60,978	77.00	
FD hold				

* RPR dissident

== Sources ==
- Official results of French elections from 1998: "Résultats électoraux officiels en France" (in French).
