= Pluneret =

Pluneret Plunered
- Commune
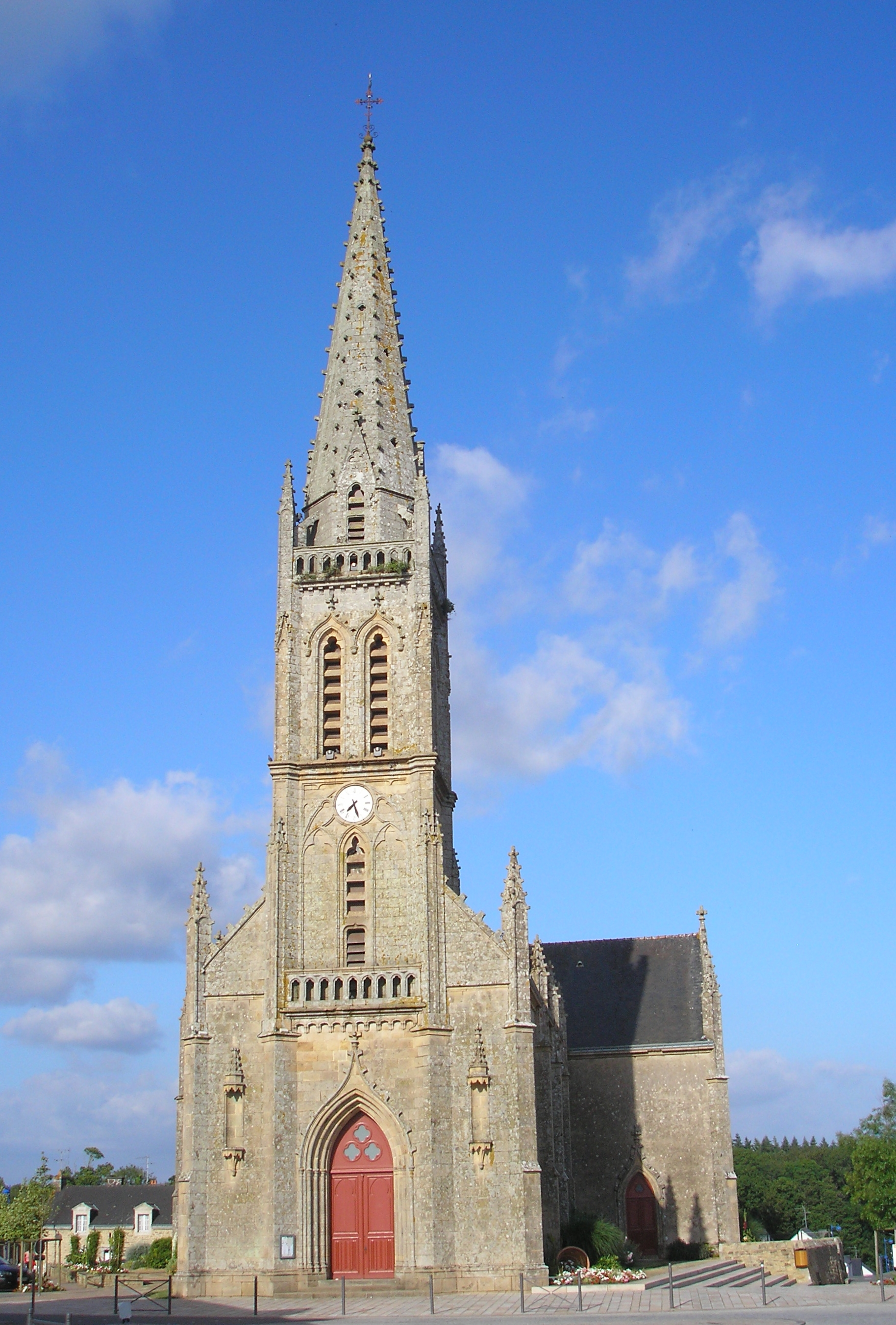
- The church in Pluneret
- Location of Pluneret
- Location within France Location within Brittany
- Coordinates: 47°40′35″N 2°57′22″W
- Country: France
- Region: Brittany
- Department: Morbihan
- Arrondissement: Lorient
- Canton: Auray
- Intercommunality: Auray Quiberon Terre Atlantique

Government
  - Mayor (2026–32): Franck Vallein
- Area^{1}: 26.20 km^{2} (10.12 sq mi)
- Highest elevation: 59 m (194 ft)
- Lowest elevation: 0 m (0 ft)
- Population (2023): 6,262
  - Density: 239.0/km^{2} (619.0/sq mi)
- Time zone: UTC+01:00 (CET)
  - Summer (DST): UTC+02:00 (CEST)
- INSEE/Postal code: 56176 /56400
- ^{1} French Land Register data, which excludes lakes, ponds, glaciers > 1 km^{2} (0.386 sq mi or 247 acres) and river estuaries.

Pluneret (French pronunciation: [plynʁɛt]; Breton: Plunered) is a commune in the Morbihan department of Brittany in north-western France. Sainte-Anne station has rail connections to Quimper, Lorient and Vannes.

== Population ==
Inhabitants of Pluneret are called in French Pluneretains.

Historical population
Year	Pop.	±% p.a.
1968	1,630	—
1975	1,871	+1.99%
1982	2,333	+3.20%
1990	3,195	+4.01%
1999	3,714	+1.69%
2007	4,706	+3.00%
2012	5,246	+2.20%
2017	5,722	+1.75%
2023	6,262	+1.51%
Source: INSEE

== Geography ==
The Loc'h river forms the western border of the town and the Bono river forms the eastern border of the town.

== Map ==
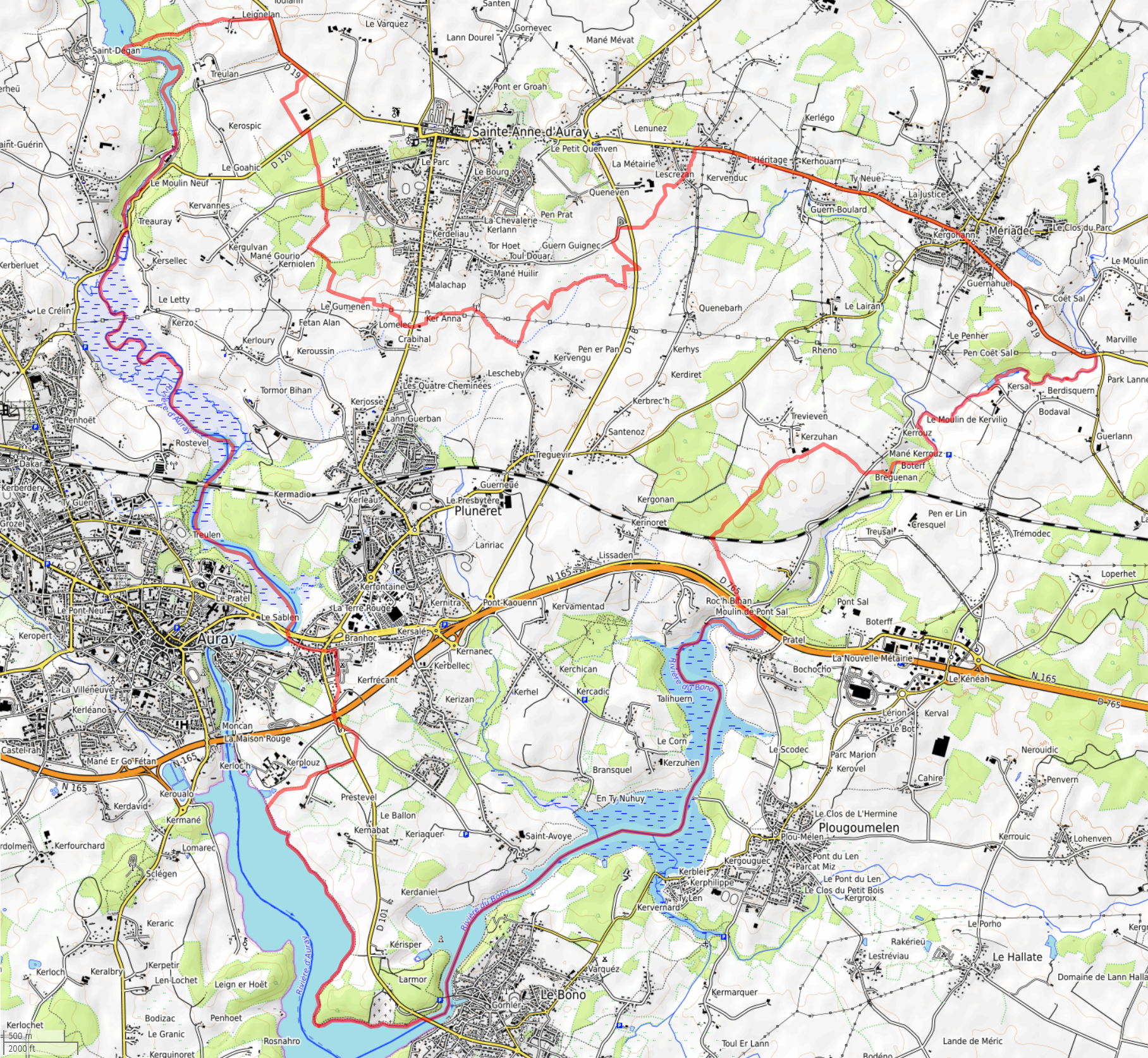
Topographic map.

== Breton language ==
The municipality launched a linguistic plan through Ya d'ar brezhoneg on 13 July 2006.

In 2008, there was 12.89% of the children attended the bilingual schools in primary education.

== See also ==
- Communes of the Morbihan department
