= Plouhinec, Morbihan =

Plouhinec Pleheneg (Breton)
- Commune
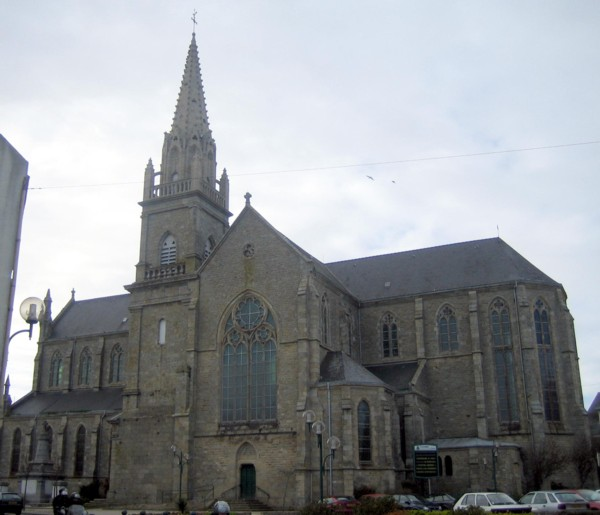
- The church in Plouhinec

- Coat of arms
- Location of Plouhinec
- Location within France Location within Brittany
- Coordinates: 47°41′54″N 3°14′59″W
- Country: France
- Region: Brittany
- Department: Morbihan
- Arrondissement: Lorient
- Canton: Pluvigner
- Intercommunality: Blavet Bellevue Océan

Government
  - Mayor (2026–32): Sophie Le Chat
- Area^{1}: 35.58 km^{2} (13.74 sq mi)
- Highest elevation: 25 m (82 ft)
- Lowest elevation: 0 m (0 ft)
- Population (2023): 5,400
  - Density: 150/km^{2} (390/sq mi)
- Time zone: UTC+01:00 (CET)
  - Summer (DST): UTC+02:00 (CEST)
- INSEE/Postal code: 56169 /56680
- ^{1} French Land Register data, which excludes lakes, ponds, glaciers > 1 km^{2} (0.386 sq mi or 247 acres) and river estuaries.

Plouhinec (French pronunciation: [pluinɛk]; Breton: Pleheneg) is a commune in the Morbihan department of Brittany in north-western France.

== Toponymy ==
From the Breton ploe (parish), ethin (ulex) and the suffix ek.

== Population ==
Inhabitants of Plouhinec are called in French Plouhinecois.

Historical population
Year	Pop.	±% p.a.
1968	3,451	—
1975	3,372	−0.33%
1982	3,553	+0.75%
1990	4,026	+1.57%
1999	4,143	+0.32%
2007	4,731	+1.67%
2012	5,214	+1.96%
2017	5,353	+0.53%
2023	5,400	+0.15%
Source: INSEE

== Geography ==
Plouhinec is a seaside town located in the southern part of Morbihan. The commune is border by Atlantic Ocean to the south and by Etel river to the east.

== Map ==
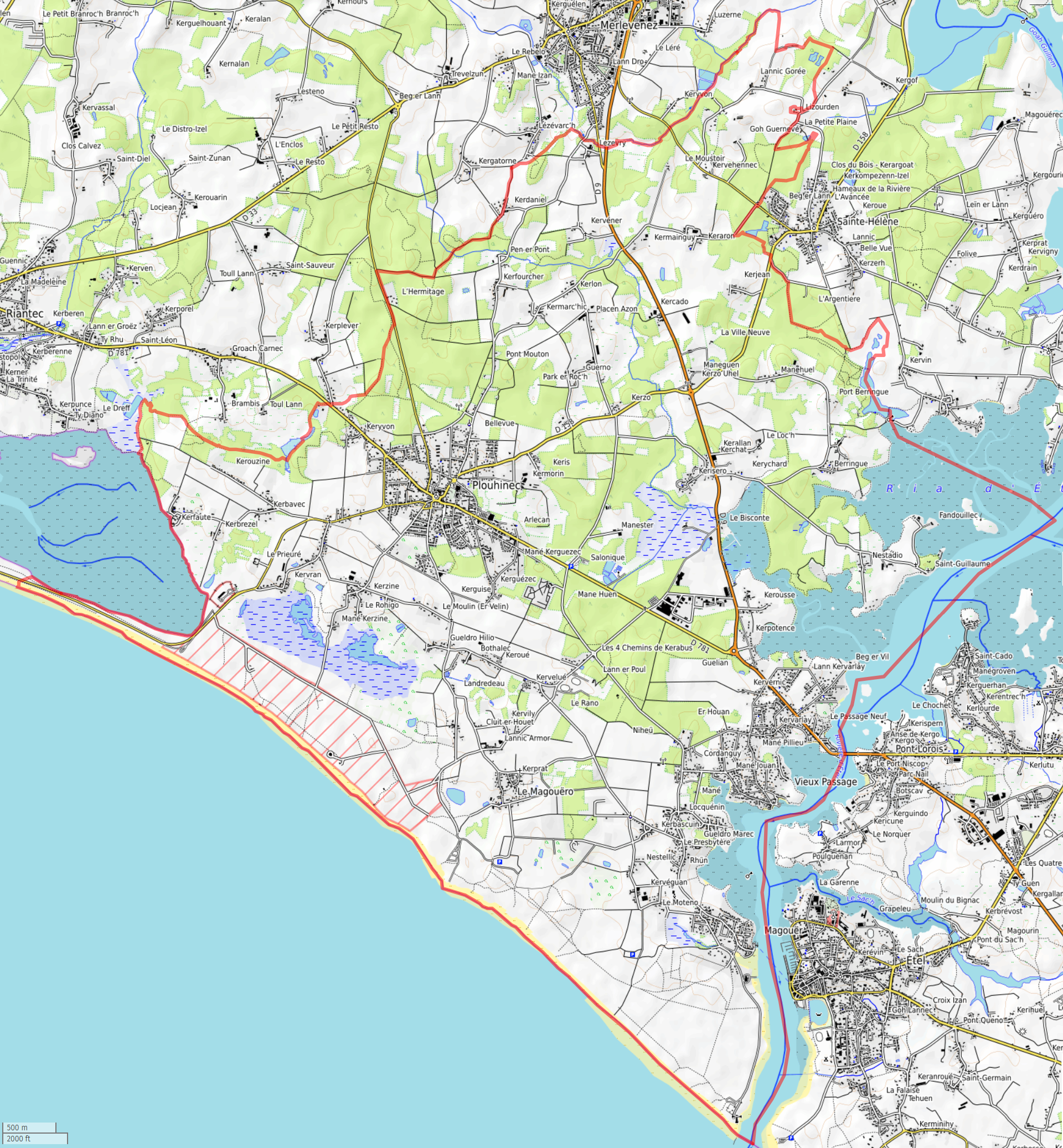
Topographic map.

== See also ==
- Communes of the Morbihan department
