= Canton of Auray =

Canton of Morbihan, France

Coordinates: 47.67°N 2.98°W

- Canton
- Location of the canton in the department of Morbihan
- Country: France
- Region: Brittany
- Department: Morbihan
- No. of communes: {{{nbcomm}}}
- Established: 15 February 1790

Government
  - Representatives (2021–2028): Michel Jalu (DVD); Marie-José Le Breton (DVD)
- Area: 128.60 km^{2} (49.65 sq mi)
- Population (2023): 34,140
  - Density: 265.5/km^{2} (687.6/sq mi)
- INSEE code: 56 01

The canton of Auray is an administrative division of the Morbihan department, in northwestern France. Its borders were modified at the French canton reorganisation which came into effect in March 2015. As a result the number of communes in the canton were reduced from 9 to 7. Its seat is in Auray.

It consists of the following communes:

1. Auray
2. Crach
3. Locmariaquer
4. Plumergat
5. Pluneret
6. Sainte-Anne-d'Auray
7. Saint-Philibert
