= Canton of Pluvigner =

Coordinates: 47.77°N 3.00°W

The canton of Pluvigner is an administrative division of the Morbihan department, northwestern France. Its borders were modified at the French canton reorganisation which came into effect in March 2015. Its seat is in Pluvigner.

It consists of the following communes:

1. Brandérion
2. Brech
3. Camors
4. Gâvres
5. Landaul
6. Landévant
7. Merlevenez
8. Nostang
9. Plouhinec
10. Pluvigner
11. Sainte-Hélène
