= Brandérion =

Commune in Brittany, France

Brandérion Branderion
- Commune
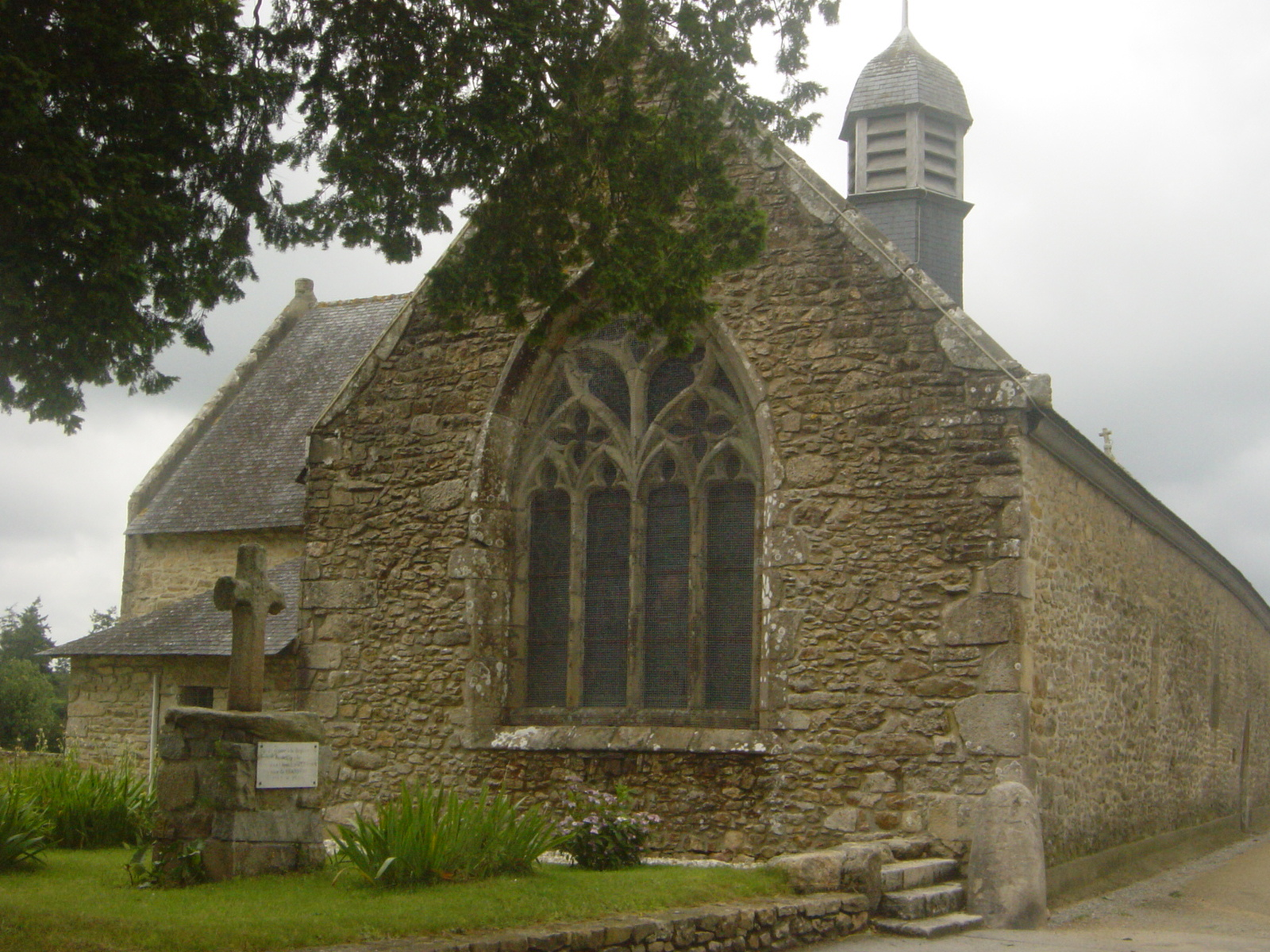
- The chapel of Brandérion

- Coat of arms
- Location of Brandérion
- Location within France Location within Brittany
- Coordinates: 47°47′39″N 3°11′36″W
- Country: France
- Region: Brittany
- Department: Morbihan
- Arrondissement: Lorient
- Canton: Pluvigner
- Intercommunality: Lorient Agglomération

Government
  - Mayor (2026–32): Gwénaël Le Bouille
- Area^{1}: 6.03 km^{2} (2.33 sq mi)
- Highest elevation: 79 m (259 ft)
- Lowest elevation: 8 m (26 ft)
- Population (2023): 1,494
  - Density: 248/km^{2} (642/sq mi)
- Time zone: UTC+01:00 (CET)
  - Summer (DST): UTC+02:00 (CEST)
- INSEE/Postal code: 56021 /56700
- ^{1} French Land Register data, which excludes lakes, ponds, glaciers > 1 km^{2} (0.386 sq mi or 247 acres) and river estuaries.

Brandérion (French pronunciation: [bʁɑ̃deʁjɔ̃]; Breton: Prederion) is a commune in the Morbihan department of Brittany in northwestern France.

== Population ==
Inhabitants of Brandérion are called in French Branderionnais.

== See also ==
- Communes of the Morbihan department
