= Michel Godard (politician) =

French politician (1933–2024)

Deputy of the French National Assembly for Morbihan's 5th constituency
- In office 2 April 1993 – 21 April 1997
- Preceded by: Pierre Victoria
- Succeeded by: Jean-Yves Le Drian

Member of the General Council of Morbihan
- In office 17 March 1985 – 15 March 1998
- Preceded by: Georges Jégouzo
- Succeeded by: Georges Jégouzo
- Constituency: Canton of Ploemeur

Mayor of Ploemeur
- In office 20 March 1983 – 25 June 1995
- Preceded by: Louis Lessart
- Succeeded by: Loïc Le Meur

Personal details
- Born: 8 November 1933 Torigni-sur-Vire, France
- Died: 2 August 2024 (aged 90)
- Party: UDF; PR
- Occupation: Schoolteacher; Electromechanical engineer

Michel Godard (8 November 1933 – 2 August 2024) was a French schoolteacher, electromechanical engineer, and politician of the Union for French Democracy (UDF) and Republican Party (PR).

== Biography ==
Born in Torigni-sur-Vire on 8 November 1933, Godard trained as an electromechanical engineer before his election as Mayor of Ploemeur in 1983, a position in which he served until 1995. He served in the General Council of Morbihan, representing the Canton of Ploemeur from 1985 to 1998. In the 1993 legislative election, he was elected to represent Morbihan's 5th constituency, defeating Socialist Party candidate Jean-Yves Le Drian with 53.39% of second round votes. He did not stand in the 1997 legislative election. In September 2001, he received the title of honorary mayor.

Godard died on 2 August 2024, at the age of 90.
