= TK Bremen =

Cargo ship from France

TK Bremen was a Maltese-flagged cargo ship that ran aground on December 16, 2011, at Erdeven, on the coast of southern Brittany in France, generating extensive media coverage and much controversy. Built in 1982 at a shipyard in Busan, South Korea, the modest-sized bulk carrier was owned by a succession of shipowners since its launch, sometimes changing flag. Regularly inspected, it did not present any major safety defects at the time of grounding.

On December 15, the ship left the port of Lorient, where it had just unloaded its cargo, as storm Joachim was forecast. The captain decided to anchor in the shelter of the island of Groix, opposite Lorient, to allow the storm to pass. During the gale, the ship was unable to hold on to its anchor, and after several attempts to reach a sheltered anchorage, it ran aground on the south coast of Morbihan on the night of December 16, causing moderate pollution but no casualties. Too damaged to be repaired, it was dismantled in January 2012 at the site of the wreck. A month later, the dune area where the ship ran aground was completely restored. The accident sparked controversy, as the port authorities were accused of allowing the ship to set sail in a forecast storm. The report by the Marine Investigation Bureau, published in April 2012, blamed poor decision-making by the captain of the TK Bremen on the night of the tragedy.

== History ==
=== Construction and features ===
The TK Bremen was built in Busan, South Korea, by Daesun Shipbuilding & Engineering. The vessel is a combined bulk carrier/multipurpose carrier. Construction began in May 1981, with delivery in June 1982. The classification society Nippon Kaiji Kyokai carries out the first survey and provides it with its navigation license.

The small freighter is 109 meters (357 ft 7 in) long, with a beam of 16.40 meters (53 ft 10 in) and a draft of 6.741 meters (22 ft 1.4 in). She has a gross tonnage of 3,992 (MSU units) and a deadweight of 6,605 tons. The castle is located aft, and it has two slipways, each served by two masts capable of lifting 20 tons. Propulsion is provided by a Hanshin 6EL44 diesel engine rated at 2,942 kilowatts (3,945 hp), which turns a single propeller with four fixed blades, enabling the ship to reach a theoretical speed of 12.5 knots (23.2 km/h; 14.4 mph); in practice, the ship can sail at full load at 10.5 knots (19.4 km/h; 12.1 mph) and in ballast at 11.7 knots (21.7 km/h; 13.5 mph). On-board power is supplied by two 200 kW auxiliary generators. Navigation and safety equipment includes two radars, an automatic identification system (AIS), a depth sounder, a gyrocompass, and two GPS. The mooring lines are made up of two 2.5-ton Hall-type toggle anchors struck on 250-metre (820 ft)-long chains made of meshes with a measured diameter of 4 centimeters (1.6 in). Its bunkers can hold 178 tonnes of heavy fuel oil and 54 tonnes of diesel. When ballasted, the vessel is loaded with 886 tonnes of seawater.

=== Operation ===
The TK Bremen changed owners several times during its operational career, as well as its name and flag: in 1995 it was renamed Elm under the Panama flag, then Melinau and Melinau Satu under the Indonesian flag. In 2011, the vessel became the property of Malta-based Blue Atlantic Shipping, which also owns another vessel of the same type and age, the TK London. This vessel is managed by Adriyatick Gemi Isletmeciligive Ticaret, which also manages 24 other vessels. These sail under Turkish or Maltese flags.

The minimum crew is 12; at the time of the grounding, the crew comprised 19 sailors, including three deck officers, three engine officers, and three officer cadets. The captain has been in service for 34 years and has held the position of commander for 1/(2+1/2) years, including 7 months on the ship. The chief officer, aged 30, has been sailing since 2001, has been chief officer for 1/(3+1/2) years, and has just joined the ship. The crew is Turkish, apart from three Azerbaijanis, and the working language on board is Turkish.

The ship was inspected 19 times between 1999 and 2011. These inspections revealed only minor breaches of safety regulations. The most serious was at the end of 2008, when, following the loss of one of its anchors, a new anchor was temporarily fixed to the chain with a steel cable for several months. At the time of the grounding, all safety certificates, which were renewed in May 2011, were still valid.

== Grounding procedure ==
=== Background ===
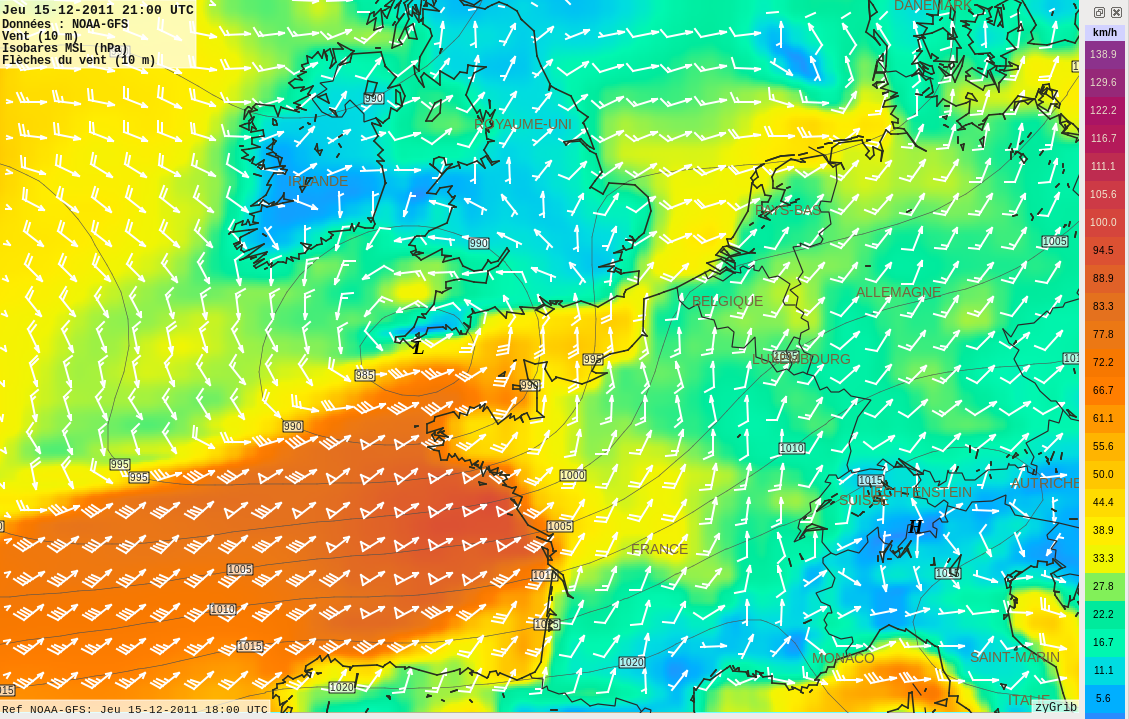
Storm Joachim before it made landfall on December 15.

The TK Bremen arrived at Lorient's Kergroise commercial port on December 12, 2011, from Ukraine, carrying 5,370 tons of sunflowers. Unloading operations run until 7 pm on December 14. By the time they were completed, the arrival of storm Joachim was forecast for the following day, on the night of December 15 to 16.

On December 14, the captain of TK Bremen informed the ship's agent, the shipowner's correspondent in Lorient, of his wish to remain alongside to let the storm pass. This request was confirmed by the ship's captain at 4:30 pm on the same day. On the morning of December 15, the shipping agent informed the ship's captain that the port authorities had authorized the vessel to remain at quay 1, but he understood that this authorization was still to be confirmed, and decided not to postpone the ship's departure.

=== Departure from the port of Lorient ===
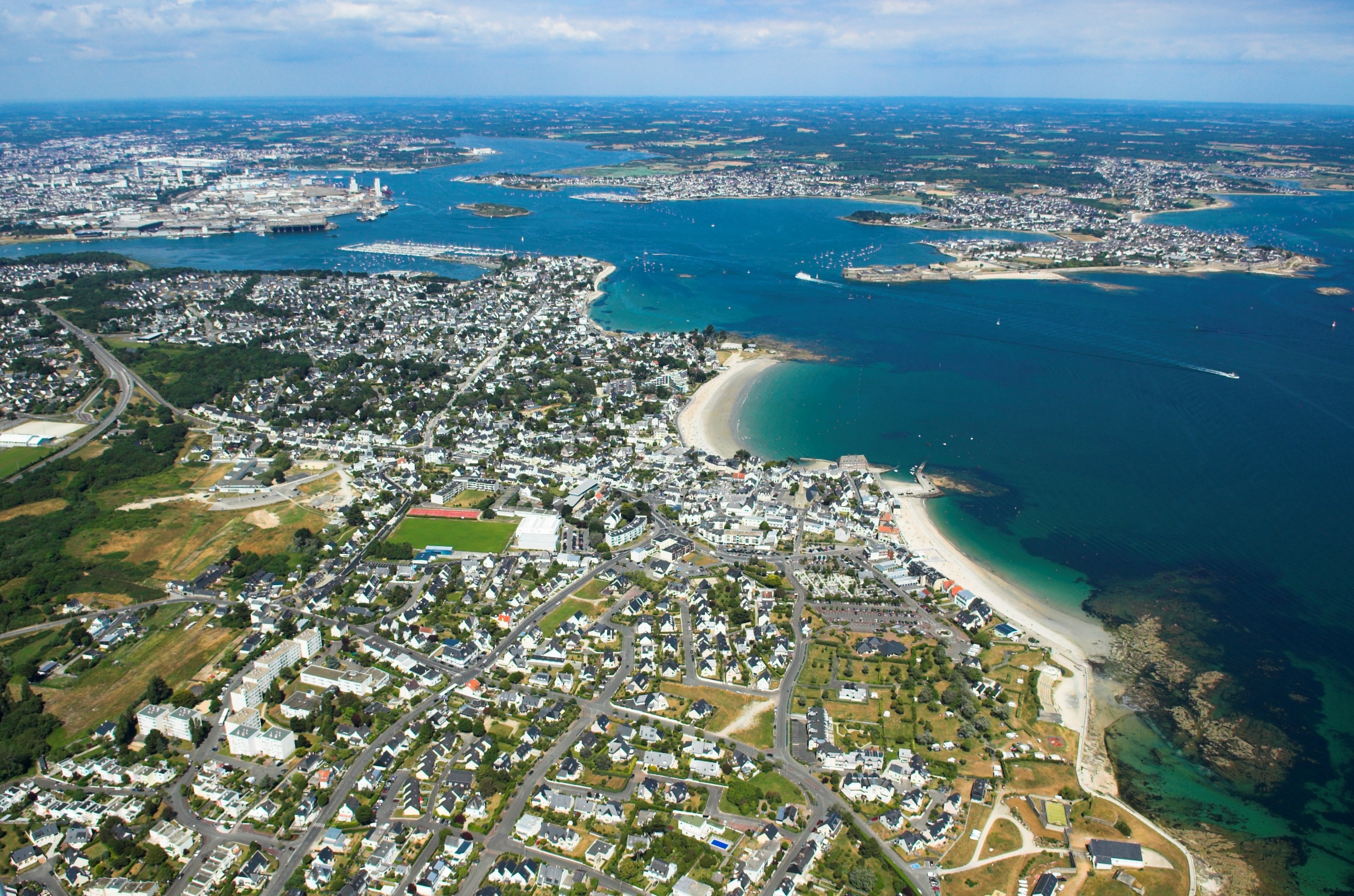
Leaving Lorient harbor.

The captain of the TK Bremen learned of the latest weather forecast at 8:30 a.m. on the morning of December 15. He ordered a tug from the port authorities to be able to set sail at 11 a.m. By this time, the swell had built up and the sea was between 5 and 6 Beaufort. The exit from Lorient harbor remained passable.

The harbor pilot boarded the vessel, while the tug Scorff came alongside and informed the ship's captain that he was authorized to remain alongside. The latter then contacted his shipowner, confirming his decision to leave port. TK Bremen left Lorient harbor at 11 a.m., bound for the United Kingdom.

=== Anchoring in the lee of Groix Island ===
Following a discussion between the pilot and the captain on the subject of shelters within range during the crossing, the latter decided to anchor in the shelter of Groix island to allow storm Joachim to pass. The anchorage is located one mile (1.6 km) north of the coast of Groix and two miles (3.2 km) east-northeast of Port-Tudy, the island's "capital" and port. At this relatively short distance from the coast, a ship is sheltered from the swell that rounds the island from the north. The anchorage was chosen with the pilot to limit interaction with the cargo ship Desert Hope, which was also at anchor in the lee of Groix. One of the ship's two anchors was spun in good conditions, and the freighter held its position until 19:30.

At 7:40 pm, despite the quality of the seabed (sand and gravel), the anchor and its chain were no longer able to hold the ship in its anchored position. The TK Bremen drifted slowly eastward, which was detected by the Lorient harbor master's office. The ship's captain decided to let the vessel drift while preparing the crew to use the engine and carry out a new anchoring maneuver. At 8 p.m., the captain decided to partially raise the chain with the help of the engine. After letting the ship drift away from the Desert Hope, he let go a long length of chain 5 to stop the ship's course. The anchorage, now 200 meters (660 ft) long (7 links), succeeded in stopping the TK Bremen, which was now zero point five miles (0.80 km) from the Desert Hope. But the situation deteriorated again, with the wind now blowing from west to south-west at 8 to 9 Beaufort. The ship was unable to hold its new anchored position; its anchor slowly crept along the bottom and, at around 10:45 pm, the TK Bremen's drift carried it into an area where the vessel was no longer sheltered from the waves and swell by the island of Groix. The ship's movement also brought it closer to a dangerous submerged wreck. CROSS Étel, in charge of monitoring shipping in the area, intervened and radioed the ship to move to a new anchorage, for which he provided the coordinates. At 11 p.m., the captain weighed anchor with the help of the engine, in what had become very difficult sea conditions. The TK Bremen tried to motor to the position indicated by the CROSS, but the vessel was unable to make headway against the wind, rolling and pitching heavily while drifting. The captain then decided to put down hard to port, but the ship soon got stuck in its turn and was unable to pass a north-north-easterly heading, which brought it into danger. The captain then decided to reverse the maneuver and return to starboard, but was unable to pass a southeast heading.

At around midnight, the ship, which was unable to sail upwind, took a course parallel to the coast, which would eventually lead to shoaling. The captain contacted his shipowner to inform him of the vessel's risky situation and obtain authorization to request assistance from a tugboat. For its part, CROSS Etel, which, thanks to radar and the AIS, was aware of the dangerous course the cargo was following, contacted the vessel to ask it to clarify its intentions. After several exchanges with TK Bremen's owner, the ship's captain requested tug assistance from CROSS at 0:36 a.m. The towing request was relayed to the port of Lorient at 0:42 a.m. At 1:20 a.m., the tug Scorff from Lorient announced that it could not go out as it was on call in the port of Lorient due to the presence of an oil tanker alongside; furthermore, the tug's captain felt that going out to sea presented a risk for his crew, as the wind had reached force 11.

=== Grounding ===
At around 1 a.m., the vessel passed near a rocky shoal surrounding the Le Roheu turret. According to the subsequent investigation report, it is likely that the very serious damage to the hull observed after the grounding (tearing of the bottom, deformation of the vertical sides) was inflicted at this point: the ship, subjected to vertical movements due to waves or swell, would have slammed (hit the bottom of the hull in a vertical downward movement) on rocks located five meters (16 ft) meters below the level of the lowest seas. At 1:13 a.m., the ship's captain repeated his towing request, stating that he was unable to take a more southerly route away from the danger. The CROSS informed him that the tug would not be in the area for some time. The tug Abeille Bourbon, which patrols the area around Ushant Island, was alerted via the Préfecture Maritime de l'Atlantique. The tug headed for Lorient at 1:29 a.m. but was unable to reach the scene until late morning. At 1:22 a.m., the CROSS asked the captain to anchor, as the vessel was now only two miles from the coast and heading towards danger. At 1:30 a.m. the vessel spun its two anchor lines in seven meters (23 ft) of water, but the anchor failed and the ship drifted towards the coast at a speed of 1.5 knots (2.8 km/h; 1.7 mph). At 1:37 a.m., CROSS informed the ship's captain that, given the bad weather, the Lorient tugboat could not intervene, and that in the meantime he would have to do "as best he could." At 1:45 a.m., the captain activated the distress signal and assembled the crew in the wheelhouse, and at 1:52 a.m. indicated that the crew was preparing to abandon ship. CROSS Étel informed the captain at 1:56 a.m. that a helicopter tasked with evacuating the crew was due to arrive in the area an hour later. At 2:01 a.m., the TK Bremen ran aground on the sandy beach of Kerminihy in the commune of Erdeven. The onboard anemometer indicated a Beaufort force 12 wind.

Firefighters arriving at the grounding site reported at 2:28 a.m. that the freighter was losing fuel. Operations to winch the crew off began at 3:04 a.m., and the first eleven sailors were disembarked at the Lann-Bihoué naval air station at 3:46 a.m. The remaining eight sailors were landed at 4:58 a.m. The rescue operation also marked the first use of the NH90 by the French Navy. The Polmar plan was activated to deal with the oil spill at sea, and booms were deployed to limit the spread of the pollution.

=== Media coverage of the event ===
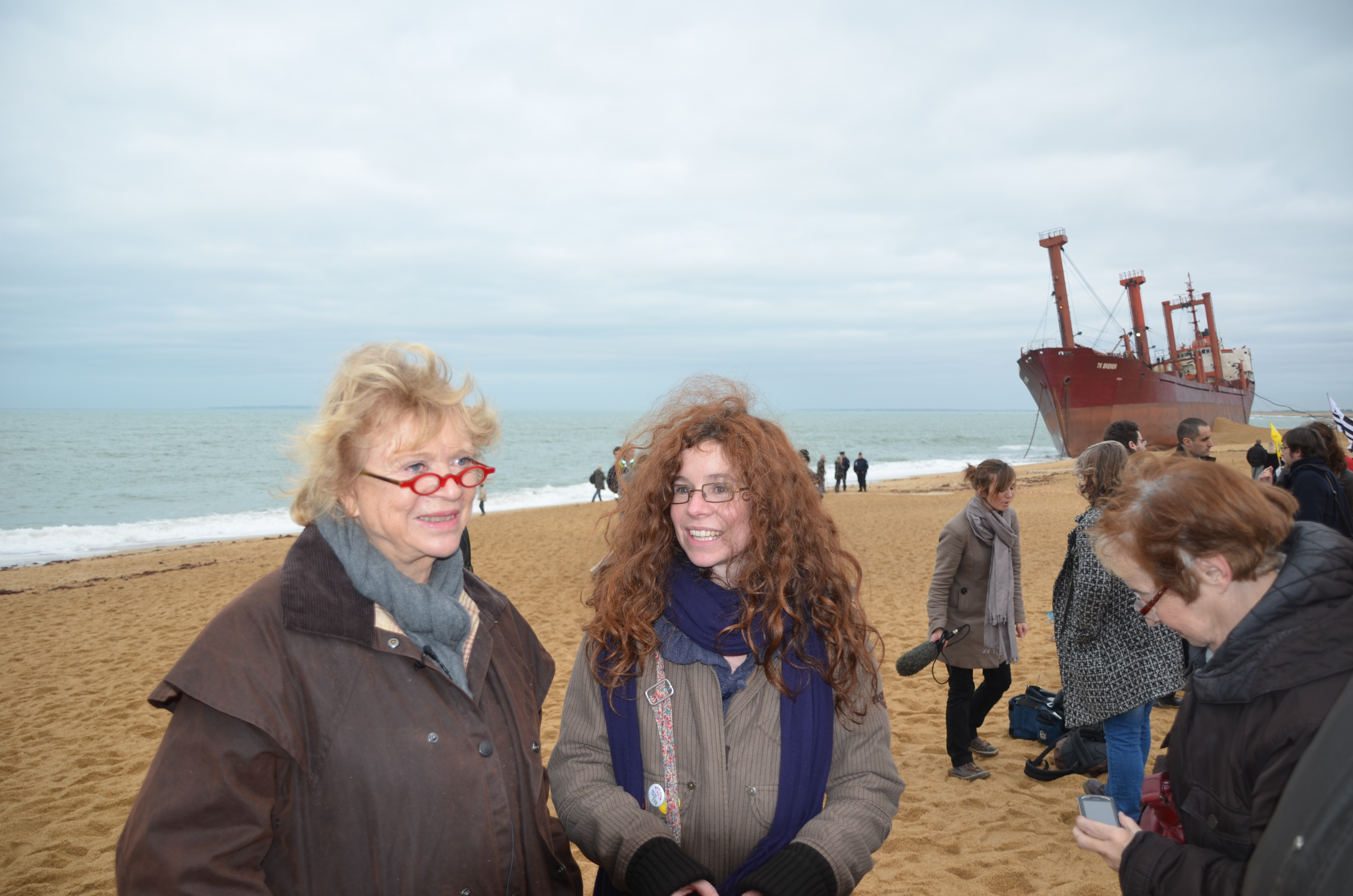
Eva Joly, candidate for Europe Écologie Les Verts in the 2012 presidential election, visits the site on December 22.

On the morning of December 16, several national media sent crews to cover the aftermath of the shipwreck. Foreign newspapers also covered the story.

The grounding took place during the pre-campaign period for the 2012 French presidential election, and several candidates or their entourages visited the site. On December 16, the French Minister of Ecology, Sustainable Development, Transport and Housing, Nathalie Kosciusko-Morizet, visited the shipwreck site, followed on December 19 by the Minister of Agriculture, Bruno Le Maire, and on December 22 by the candidate for Europe Écologie Les Verts, Eva Joly. French President Nicolas Sarkozy met the helicopter pilots who rescued the ship's sailors during his wishes to the armed forces.

The grounding and dismantling of the ship were also covered by photographer and marine painter Philip Plisson, and a piece of the bow bearing the name of the freighter was cut out and preserved by the Erdeven town hall.

== Consequences of the sinking ==
=== Ecological consequences ===
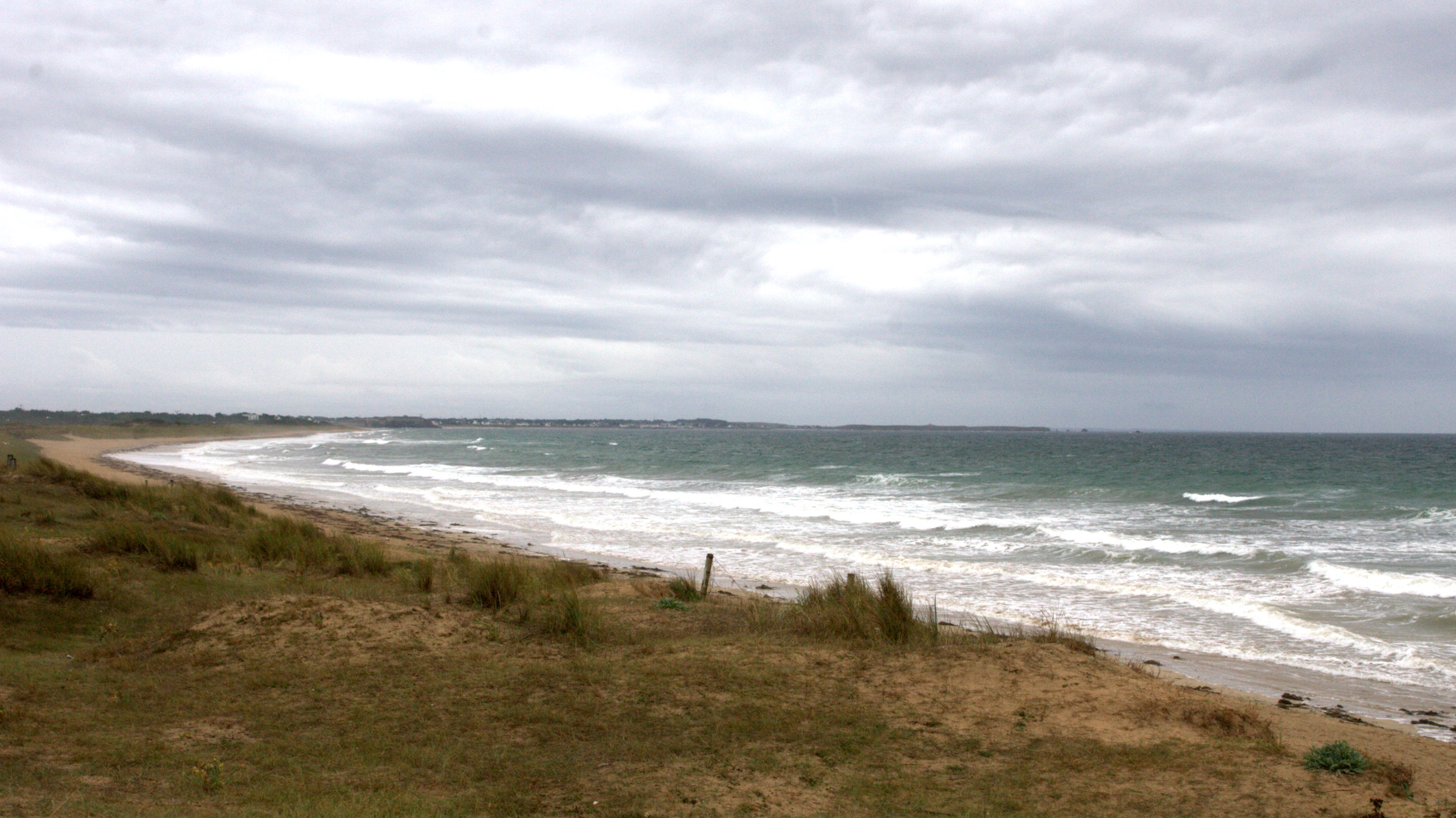
The dune area where the ship ran aground.

Maritime pollution was judged "limited" by the Préfecture Maritime de Brest. 60,000 liters (16,000 U.S. gal; 13,000 imp gal) of fuel oil were spilled into the sea, and around one hundred cubic meters (3,500 cu ft) of sand were affected. 32 cubic meters (1,100 cu ft) of the fuel oil were pumped into the sea on December 17 as part of the Polmar plan. 250 firefighters and municipal employees were deployed to recover the polluted sand over the weekend following the grounding, and booms were deployed at the entrance to the Etel ria. Three oiled birds were also recovered by December 19. Pumping of the fuel remaining in the ship's tanks was completed on December 23.

Forty oyster farms were threatened by fuel leaks in the ria d'Etel, and restrictions on the marketing of oysters were imposed by the prefecture on December 16th, but only affected five businesses located downstream from the island of Saint-Cado. Professional foot fishermen were more affected, with around forty of them, operating on the coast, banned from harvesting. The health situation was stabilized by December 29, with the prefecture authorizing the consumption of most of the region's oysters. The fishing bans were finally lifted on January 19 for professionals, and on March 9 for leisure fishing.

The stranding site is also located in an area that includes several protected natural sites, mainly the Gâvres-Quiberon dune massif (Natura 2000), the Erdeven dunes (ZNIEFF type 1), and the Erdeven and Plouharnel coastline (ZNIEFF type 2). This complicated operations. Local councillors began by reminding visitors of the special nature of the site, before issuing a municipal by-law prohibiting access by unauthorized persons, and the Morbihan prefecture also took steps to regulate access to the site.

=== Legal follow-up ===
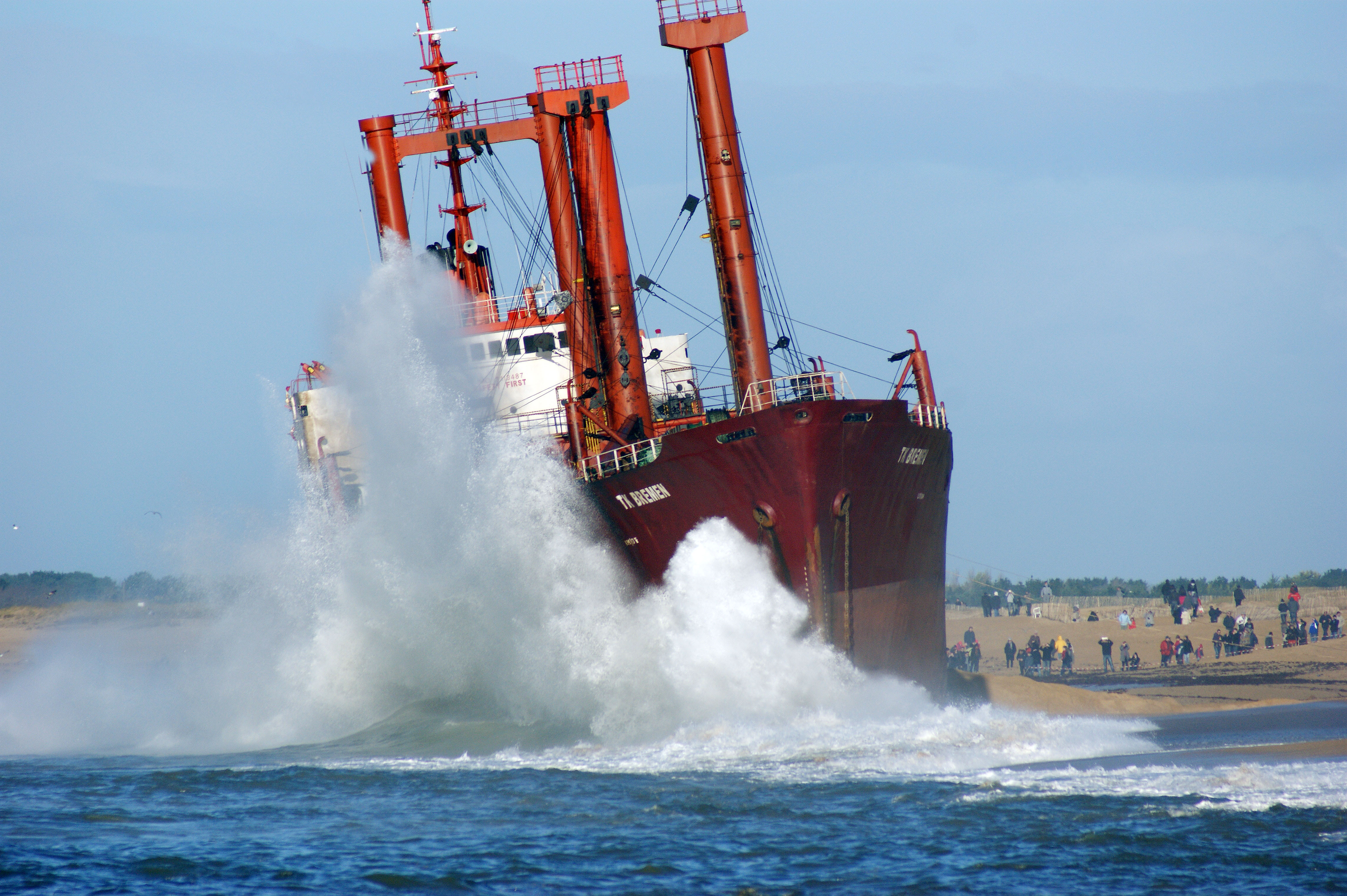
The TK Bremen the day after the grounding.

Following the grounding of the freighter, the President of the Regional Council, Jean-Yves Le Drian, announced that he would be filing a complaint with a civil action following the grounding on a classified Morbihan beach, as did the mixed syndicate of the Étel ria. At the same time, the President of the Morbihan General Council, François Goulard, said he wanted to "wait and see how the investigation unfolds before taking a decision"; on January 27, 2012, the Morbihan General Council announced that it would be filing a civil action in the judicial investigation into the grounding of the cargo ship at Brest.

The ship's captain was taken into custody and presented to the public prosecutor's office on December 20. The following day, the Brest public prosecutor's office opened a judicial investigation, and the captain was granted assisted witness status on the same day. The nautical investigation was entrusted to affaires maritimes, and the technical investigation to the Bureau d'enquêtes sur les événements de mer. The BEA mer issued its report on April 17, pointing to the captain's poor management of the anchorage.

In 2015, the case concerning the criminal liability of the ship's operators was still being investigated by an examining magistrate in Brest.

A controversy erupted in the days following the grounding, concerning the possibility of requiring a captain to remain in port in the event of unfavorable weather conditions. The officers of the commercial port of Kergroise were criticized by an environmental association for not holding the boat alongside the quay but claimed that they had no legal means of doing so. On February 3, a decree was published in the Journal Officiel allowing maritime prefects to direct ships in distress to a port of their choice. This decree is the application of a European directive decided in 2009 following the sinking of the Erika and Prestige oil tankers.

A trial took place from October 3 to 5, 2018 at the Brest criminal court. The public prosecutor's office pointed to the succession of negligence and errors committed by the captain as a fault for which it was seeking a six-month suspended prison sentence and €20,000 fine. The defense plead for the captain's acquittal, pointing to a lack of information given to the captain, or at least too late: he would have learned about the possibility of staying in port from the pilot when he came on board at the time of the planned departure, and not earlier from the agent. Judgment was set for December 13, 2018.

On December 13, 2018, the Brest Criminal Court acquitted Commander Rifat Tahmaz.

=== The report by the Bureau d'enquêtes sur les événements de mer ===
The report by the Bureau d'enquêtes sur les événements de mer (French Marine Accident Investigation Office) firstly highlighted the poor dissemination of information by the Lorient port authorities: the captain of TK Bremen was only formally informed that he was authorized to remain in port as he had requested, once the pilot, tugs and tugboats had been ordered. At this stage, the ship's captain, if he wished to remain at the station, would have had to pay a penalty to compensate for the resources mobilized to get him out of port. It is likely that his decision to leave the port stemmed from these financial considerations. Nevertheless, according to the report, the fact of setting sail despite the arrival of the storm and taking up a waiting anchorage to leeward of the island of Groix is not considered a contributing factor in the grounding.

The determining factor in the grounding was the captain's decision to pull up part of his anchorage when he noticed that his vessel was hunting, and then to let it drift before returning to an anchorage. The decision that should have been taken in this type of situation was to try to hold on at all costs to the designated anchorage, which was the most sheltered, by using the engine on the one hand, and by dropping the second anchor on the other. Furthermore, the captain's decision, once underway, to turn to port when he realized that the vessel was unable to get upwind, was an aggravating factor in that it brought the vessel a mile closer to the coast. The efficiency of the ship's propulsion was reduced in its attempts to sail upwind, as it left the port of Lorient on ballast, which increased its ability to catch the wind.

The report also pointed to shortcomings in the interventions of the three players responsible for monitoring the maritime zone off Lorient. Until midnight, neither the CROSS in Etel, responsible for managing the maritime zone, nor the semaphore at Beg Melen, located on the north-west coast of the island of Groix and responsible for monitoring the water, asked the captain for factual information on the situation of TK Bremen: the ship's maneuvers were therefore interpreted as voluntary displacements, which prevented them from reacting, especially as the captain did not report his problems until after midnight. The Lorient harbour master's office, for its part, was unable to communicate with the ship, and the origin of this anomaly was not identified.

=== Dismantling the ship ===
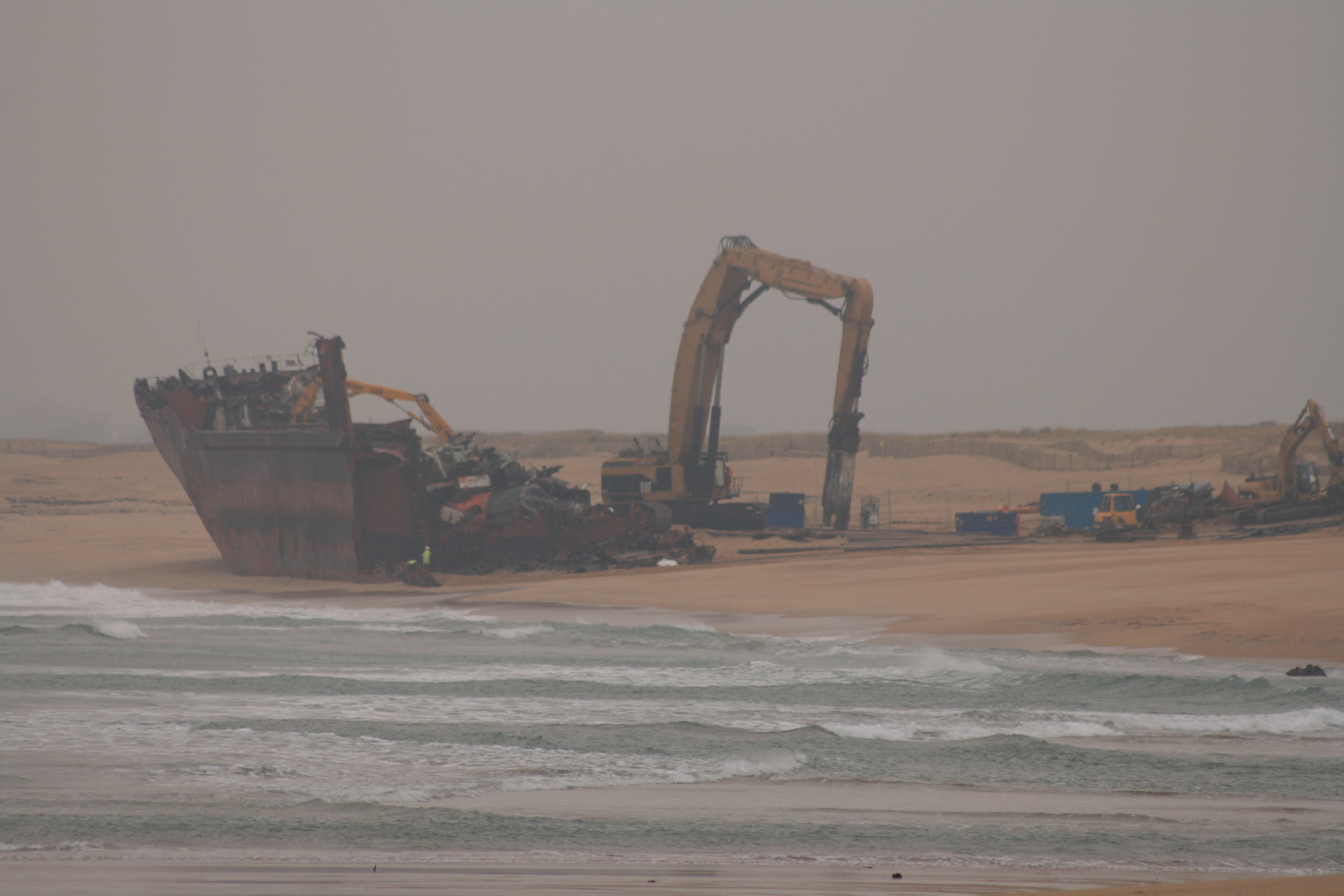
The demolition site, January 15.

Before running aground, the ship probably struck rocks at the Le Roheu turret. According to the grounding report, which lists only the most serious damage, the bottom of the hull showed tears and the vertical walls were significantly deformed over the entire height at the 3/4 aft starboard and port sides of hold number 2. The French authorities decided that the vessel, too badly damaged, must be dismantled on site after pumping out its fuel; this information was made public through the Brest Préfecture Maritime and the Lorient Sub-Prefecture. On December 22, the Turkish shipowner was given formal notice to deconstruct the vessel and rehabilitate the site by April 6, 2012.

The contract to dismantle the wreck was awarded to a Dutch company, and the beach was closed to the public from December 23 for the duration of the work. This company had already worked on dismantling the Rokia Delmas, which ran aground in Charente-Maritime in 2006, and work began on December 26. The plan was to cut up the wreck using a giant crane, then remove the 2,000 tonnes (2,000 long tons; 2,200 short tons) of metal in three weeks, before restoring the site to its original state in two and a half months. The dismantling of the interior fittings was awarded to a Brest-based company, which arrived on site on December 23, while the water decontamination work was entrusted to a Saint-Malo-based company.

Cutting of the boat began on the evening of January 6, using a 280-ton articulated arm. The main mast was cut on January 8. On January 11, limited pollution was reported on the site, due to fuel in the bilge. Some associations criticized the speed with which the work was being carried out, but the Préfecture Maritime emphasized the danger posed by the wreck, as well as the favorable weather window at the time. The actual demolition work was completed on January 26. The 2,000 tonnes of scrap metal were transported to the commercial port of Kergroise, where the ship had departed from on December 15, in March 2012, before being shipped to Bayonne, where the metal was to be resold.

Work to restore the dune began on January 26 and was completed on February 25, more than a month ahead of schedule. Access to the site was once again authorized, but swimming was prohibited due to residual pollution risks. Restoration of the dune area then began, with the aim of restoring the previous natural configuration. On March 16, the beach was restored, the rehabilitation of the site officially completed, and the site reopened.

== See also ==
- Cargo ship
- Cyclone Joachim
- Erdeven

== Bibliography ==
- Bureau d'enquêtes sur les évènements de mer (2012). Rapport d'enquête technique : « TK Bremen » (PDF) (in French).
