= Cantons of the Morbihan department =

The following is a list of the 21 cantons of the Morbihan department, in France, following the French canton reorganisation which came into effect in March 2015:

- Auray
- Gourin
- Grand-Champ
- Guer
- Guidel
- Hennebont
- Lanester
- Lorient-1
- Lorient-2
- Moréac
- Muzillac
- Ploemeur
- Ploërmel
- Pluvigner
- Pontivy
- Questembert
- Quiberon
- Séné
- Vannes-1
- Vannes-2
- Vannes-3
