= Departmental Council of Morbihan =

- Logo of the Council

Leadership
- President: David Lappartient, DVD since 1 July 2021

Website
- www.morbihan.fr

The Departmental Council of Morbihan (French: Conseil départemental du Morbihan, Breton: Kuzul-departamant ar Morbihan) is the deliberative assembly of the French department of Morbihan. It consists of 42 members (departmental councillors) elected from 21 cantons and its headquarters are in Vannes, capital of the department. The departmental councilors are elected for a 6-years term.

The president of the departmental council is David Lappartient.

== Vice-Presidents ==
The president of the departmental council is assisted by 12 vice-presidents chosen from among the departmental advisers. Each of them has a delegation of authority.

List of vice-presidents of the Morbihan Departmental Council (as of 2021)
Order	Name	Party	Canton	Delegation
1st	Karine Bellec	DVD	Quiberon	People with disabilities
2nd	Ronan Loas	DVD	Ploemeur	Culture, higher education and research
3rd	Gaëlle Favennec	DVD	Vannes-3	Integration and employment
4th	Gérard Pierre	DVD	Quiberon	Roads, mobility, sea, coast and islands
5th	Marie-Jo Le Breton	UCD	Auray	Sport and community life
6th	Dominique Le Niniven	UCD	Gourin	Children and families
7th	Marie-Christine Le Quer	DVC	Pluvigner	Agriculture, Fisheries, Environment and Water Policy
8th	Fabrice Robelet	DVC	Pluvigner	Elderly
9th	Soizic Perrault	UD	Pontivy	Tourism, housing and housing
10th	Benoît Quero	UD	Pontivy	Action in favour of local authorities
11th	Christine Penhouët	DVD	Vannes-1	Education
12th	Gilles Dufeigneux	DVD	Vannes-3	Attractiveness and major events

== See also ==
- Morbihan
- Departmental council (France)
