= Canton of Vannes =

Canton of Vannes may refer to:

- Canton of Vannes-1, Morbihan, Brittany, France
- Canton of Vannes-2, Morbihan, Brittany, France
- Canton of Vannes-3, Morbihan, Brittany, France

== See also ==
- Arrondissement of Vannes, Morbihan, Brittany, France
- Vannes, Morbihan, Brittany, France
- Vannes (disambiguation)
