= Erdeven =

Commune in Brittany, France

Erdeven An Ardeven
- Commune
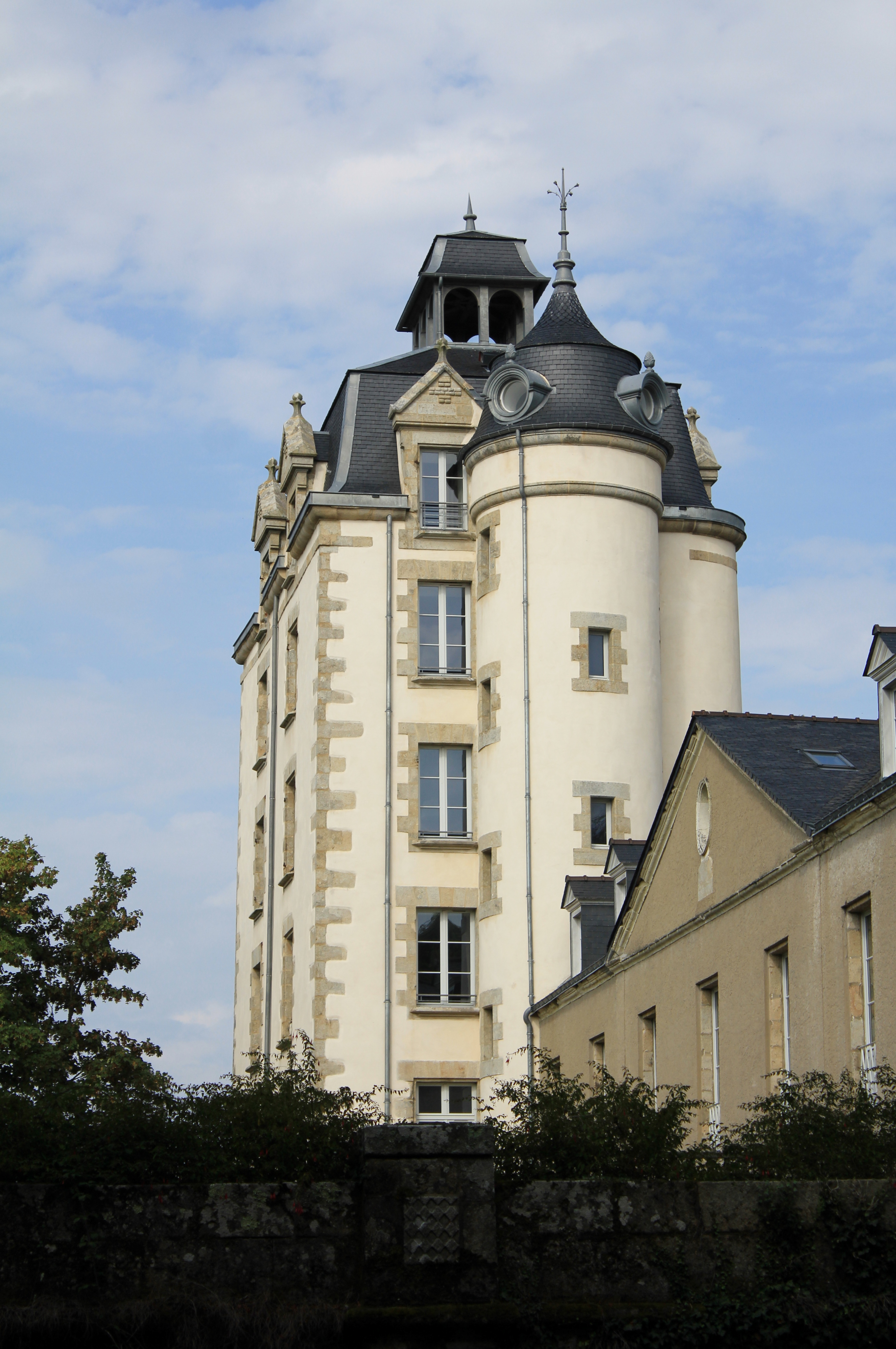
- The Château of Kéravéon

- Coat of arms
- Location of Erdeven
- Location within France Location within Brittany
- Coordinates: 47°38′N 3°10′W
- Country: France
- Region: Brittany
- Department: Morbihan
- Arrondissement: Lorient
- Canton: Quiberon
- Intercommunality: Auray Quiberon Terre Atlantique

Government
  - Mayor (2026–32): Dominique Riguidel
- Area^{1}: 30.64 km^{2} (11.83 sq mi)
- Elevation: 20 m (66 ft)
- Highest elevation: 36 m (118 ft)
- Lowest elevation: 0 m (0 ft)
- Population (2023): 4,008
  - Density: 130.8/km^{2} (338.8/sq mi)
- Time zone: UTC+01:00 (CET)
  - Summer (DST): UTC+02:00 (CEST)
- INSEE/Postal code: 56054 /56410
- ^{1} French Land Register data, which excludes lakes, ponds, glaciers > 1 km^{2} (0.386 sq mi or 247 acres) and river estuaries.

Erdeven (French pronunciation: [ɛʁdəvɛn]; Breton: An Ardeven) is a commune in the Morbihan department in the region of Brittany in north-western France.

Its main industry is tourism. Attractions include a seven kilometre-long beach beside the Atlantic and many prehistoric sites featuring megaliths. The Mané-Croch, Mané-Bras and Crucuno dolmens and the Kerzérho alignments lie just outside the commune.

== Population ==
Historical population
Year	Pop.	±% p.a.
1968	1,910	—
1975	1,986	+0.56%
1982	2,145	+1.11%
1990	2,352	+1.16%
1999	2,523	+0.78%
2007	3,240	+3.18%
2012	3,488	+1.49%
2017	3,666	+1.00%
2023	4,008	+1.50%
Source: INSEE

Inhabitants of Erdeven are called Erdevenois in French.

== Twin towns ==
It is twinned with St. Märgen in the Black Forest region of Germany.

== Gallery ==
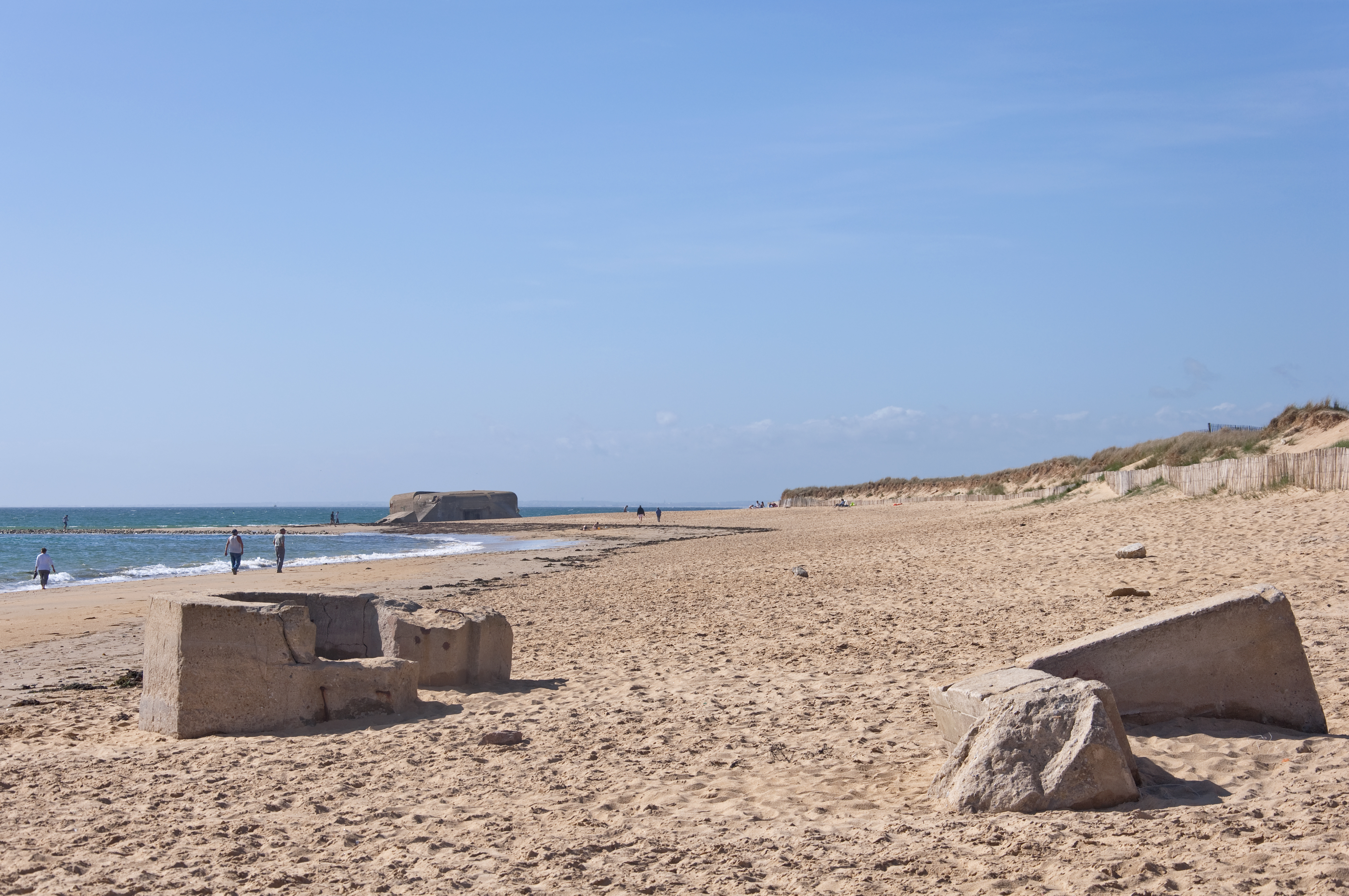
Kerouriec beach in Erdeven

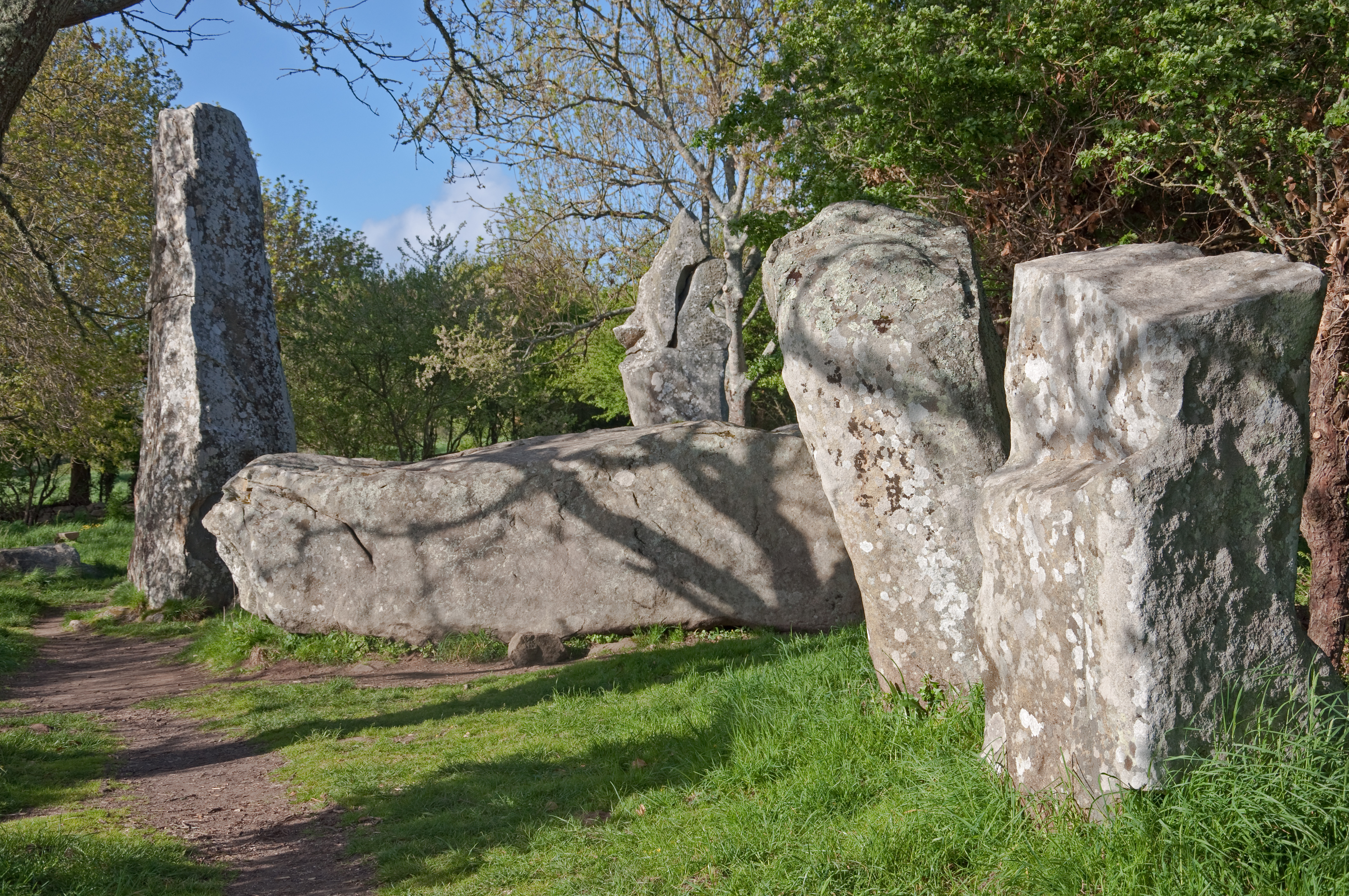
The “Kerzérho Giants” in Erdeven

== See also ==
- Carnac
- Communes of the Morbihan département
- TK Bremen
