= Diego Yesso =

French footballer (born 1984)

Personal information
- Date of birth: 26 November 1984 (age 41)
- Place of birth: Ploemeur, France
- Height: 1.69 m (5 ft 7 in)
- Position: Midfielder

Senior career*
Years	Team	Apps	(Gls)
2004–2007	Lorient	18	(0)
2007	Pau FC	12	(0)
2008	US Avranches	8	(0)
2008–2009	Concarneau	12	(0)
2009–2014	US Montagnarde		
- * Club domestic league appearances and goals

Diego Yesso (born 26 November 1984) is a French former professional footballer who played as a midfielder.

== Career ==
Yesso was born in Ploemeur. He played on the professional level in Ligue 1 and Ligue 2 for FC Lorient.
