= Arrondissements of the Morbihan department =

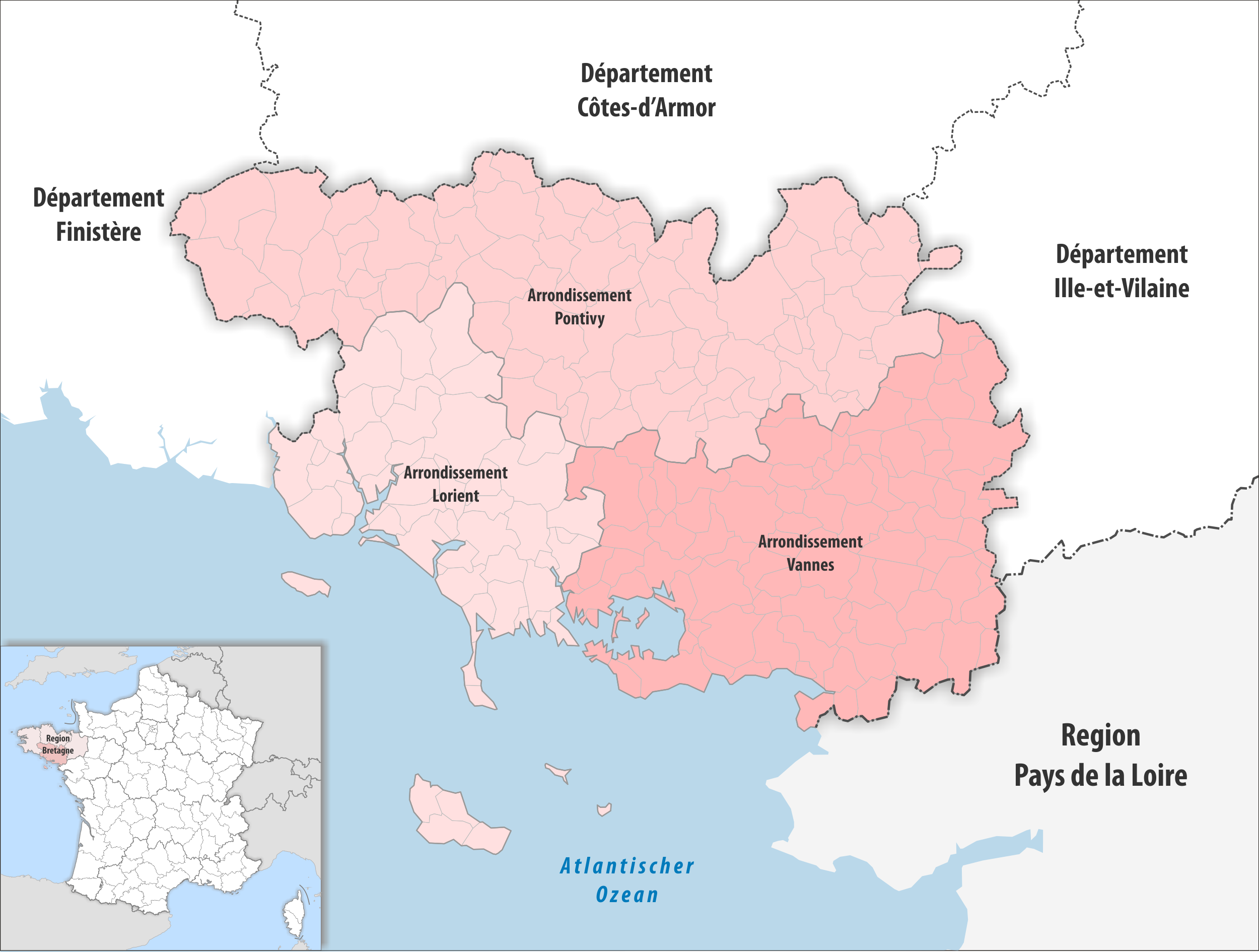
Map of arrondissements of the Morbihan department.

The three arrondissements of the Morbihan department are:

1. Arrondissement of Lorient, (subprefecture: Lorient) with 58 communes. The population of the arrondissement was 320,544 in 2021.
2. Arrondissement of Pontivy, (subprefecture: Pontivy) with 92 communes. The population of the arrondissement was 156,187 in 2021.
3. Arrondissement of Vannes, (prefecture of the Morbihan department: Vannes) with 99 communes. The population of the arrondissement was 291,956 in 2021.

== History ==
In 1800 the arrondissements of Vannes, Lorient, Ploërmel and Pontivy were established. The arrondissement of Ploërmel was disbanded in 1926.

The borders of the arrondissements of Morbihan were modified in January 2017:

- two communes from the arrondissement of Lorient to the arrondissement of Vannes
- 21 communes from the arrondissement of Vannes to the arrondissement of Pontivy
