= Kerzérho =

Stone rows in Erdeven, France

Coordinates: 47°38′5″N 3°8′53″W

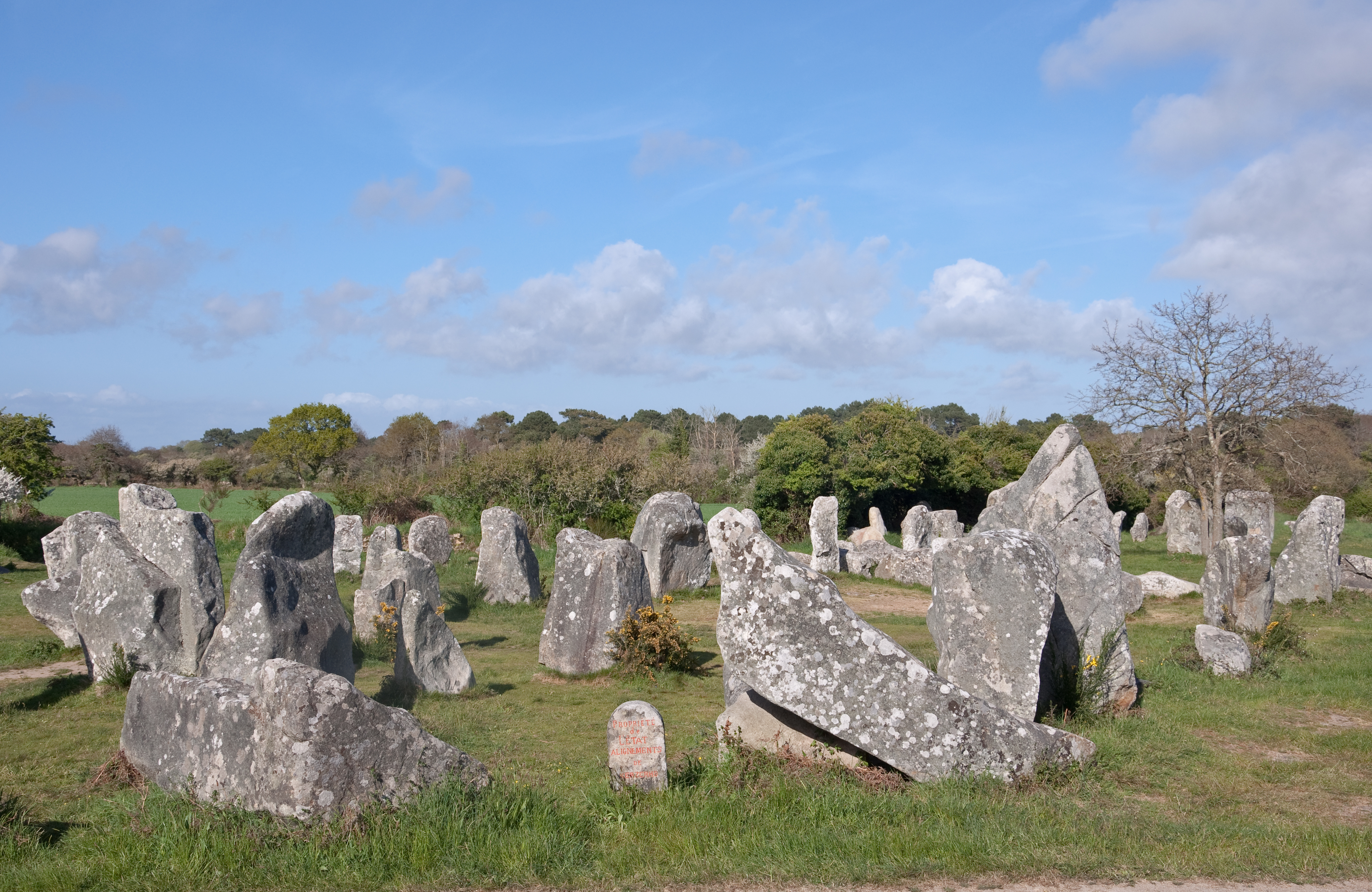
The Kerzerho alignments

Kerzérho is a set of Neolithic alignments in the commune of Erdeven, in the region of Brittany, France. It lies approximately 8 km northwest of Carnac. It is a protected monument since 1862.
