= Groix =

Commune in Brittany, France

Groix Groe
- Commune
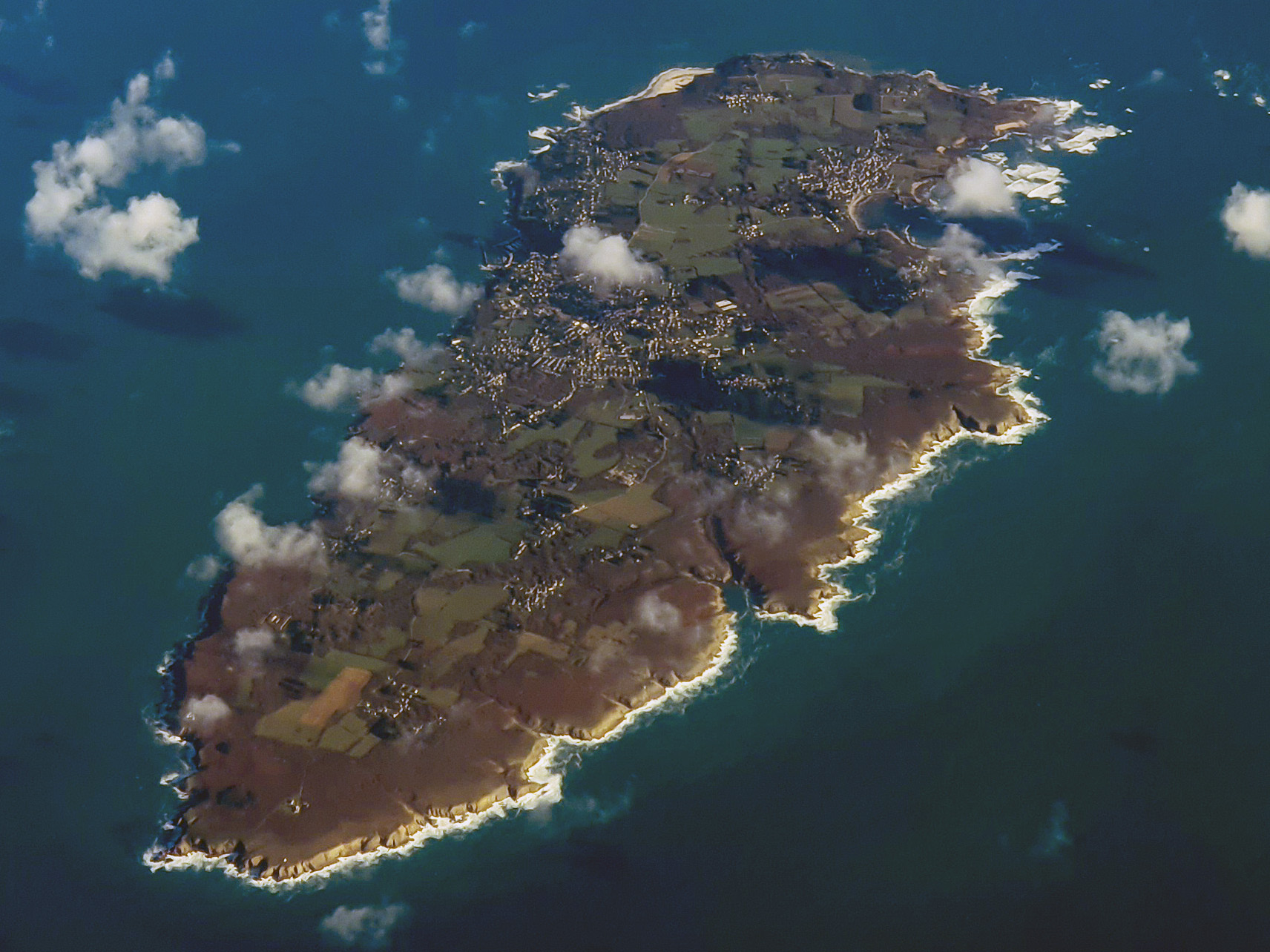
- Aerial view of Groix

- Coat of arms
- Location of Groix
- Location within France Location within Brittany
- Coordinates: 47°38′22″N 3°27′13″W
- Country: France
- Region: Brittany
- Department: Morbihan
- Arrondissement: Lorient
- Canton: Lorient-2
- Intercommunality: Lorient Agglomération

Government
  - Mayor (2026–32): Erwan Tonnerre
- Area^{1}: 14.82 km^{2} (5.72 sq mi)
- Highest elevation: 48 m (157 ft)
- Lowest elevation: 0 m (0 ft)
- Population (2023): 2,310
  - Density: 156/km^{2} (404/sq mi)
- Time zone: UTC+01:00 (CET)
  - Summer (DST): UTC+02:00 (CEST)
- INSEE/Postal code: 56069 /56590
- ^{1} French Land Register data, which excludes lakes, ponds, glaciers > 1 km^{2} (0.386 sq mi or 247 acres) and river estuaries.

Groix (French pronunciation: [ɡʁwa]; Breton: Enez Groe) is an island and a commune in the Morbihan department of the region of Brittany in north-western France.

== Geography ==
Groix lies a few kilometres off the coast of Lorient. Several ferries a day run from Lorient to Groix.

There are a few small towns on the island. High cliffs are on its north coast and sandy beaches in secluded coves on the south coast. Groix is also home to a wide variety of sea birds. Groix is also famous for hosting the only convex beach in Europe, which also shifts with ocean currents. During the last 15 years, the beach has moved half a kilometer (546.807 yards) westbound.

== Geology ==
The geology of Groix is distinct from that of the nearby continent, and the east and south coasts have been designated a mineral nature reserve since 1982. More than 60 minerals can be found on the island, particularly blue glaucophane (observable on the surface), epidote or garnet. The island mainly consists of schist.

== History ==
A major naval battle between Britain and France took place off Groix in 1795.

== In popular culture ==
The island is the major setting in the fourth book of The Enzo Files series—Freeze Frame—by author Peter May.

== Climate ==
Climate data for Groix (1981–2010 averages)
Month	Jan	Feb	Mar	Apr	May	Jun	Jul	Aug	Sep	Oct	Nov	Dec	Year
Record high °C (°F)	15.4 (59.7)	16.6 (61.9)	22.8 (73.0)	25.8 (78.4)	29.7 (85.5)	35.6 (96.1)	35.3 (95.5)	35.2 (95.4)	31.0 (87.8)	26.5 (79.7)	19.5 (67.1)	16.0 (60.8)	35.6 (96.1)
Mean daily maximum °C (°F)	9.5 (49.1)	9.5 (49.1)	11.5 (52.7)	13.6 (56.5)	16.6 (61.9)	19.2 (66.6)	21.0 (69.8)	21.3 (70.3)	19.8 (67.6)	16.3 (61.3)	12.7 (54.9)	10.2 (50.4)	15.1 (59.2)
Mean daily minimum °C (°F)	5.7 (42.3)	5.3 (41.5)	6.8 (44.2)	7.9 (46.2)	10.8 (51.4)	13.3 (55.9)	15.1 (59.2)	15.3 (59.5)	13.8 (56.8)	11.7 (53.1)	8.8 (47.8)	6.4 (43.5)	10.1 (50.2)
Record low °C (°F)	−9.4 (15.1)	−8.0 (17.6)	−6.2 (20.8)	−1.0 (30.2)	0.4 (32.7)	5.8 (42.4)	7.8 (46.0)	8.4 (47.1)	7.6 (45.7)	1.8 (35.2)	−2.4 (27.7)	−6.0 (21.2)	−9.4 (15.1)
Average precipitation mm (inches)	95.7 (3.77)	70.6 (2.78)	65.0 (2.56)	61.3 (2.41)	59.2 (2.33)	42.2 (1.66)	42.7 (1.68)	39.1 (1.54)	56.4 (2.22)	92.3 (3.63)	91.3 (3.59)	98.9 (3.89)	814.7 (32.07)
Average relative humidity (%)	87	86	85	82	84	83	83	83	83	86	86	88	84.7
Source 1: Météo France
Source 2: Infoclimat.fr (humidity, 1961–1990)

== Population ==
Historical population
Year	Pop.	±% p.a.
1968	3,161	—
1975	2,727	−2.09%
1982	2,605	−0.65%
1990	2,472	−0.65%
1999	2,275	−0.92%
2007	2,291	+0.09%
2012	2,223	−0.60%
2017	2,263	+0.36%
2023	2,310	+0.34%
Source: INSEE

Inhabitants of Groix are called Groisillons in French.

== Gallery ==
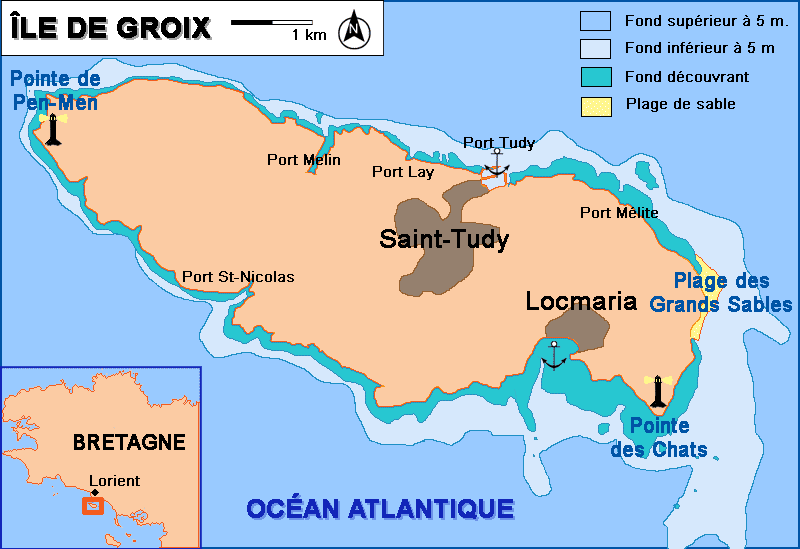
A map of Groix

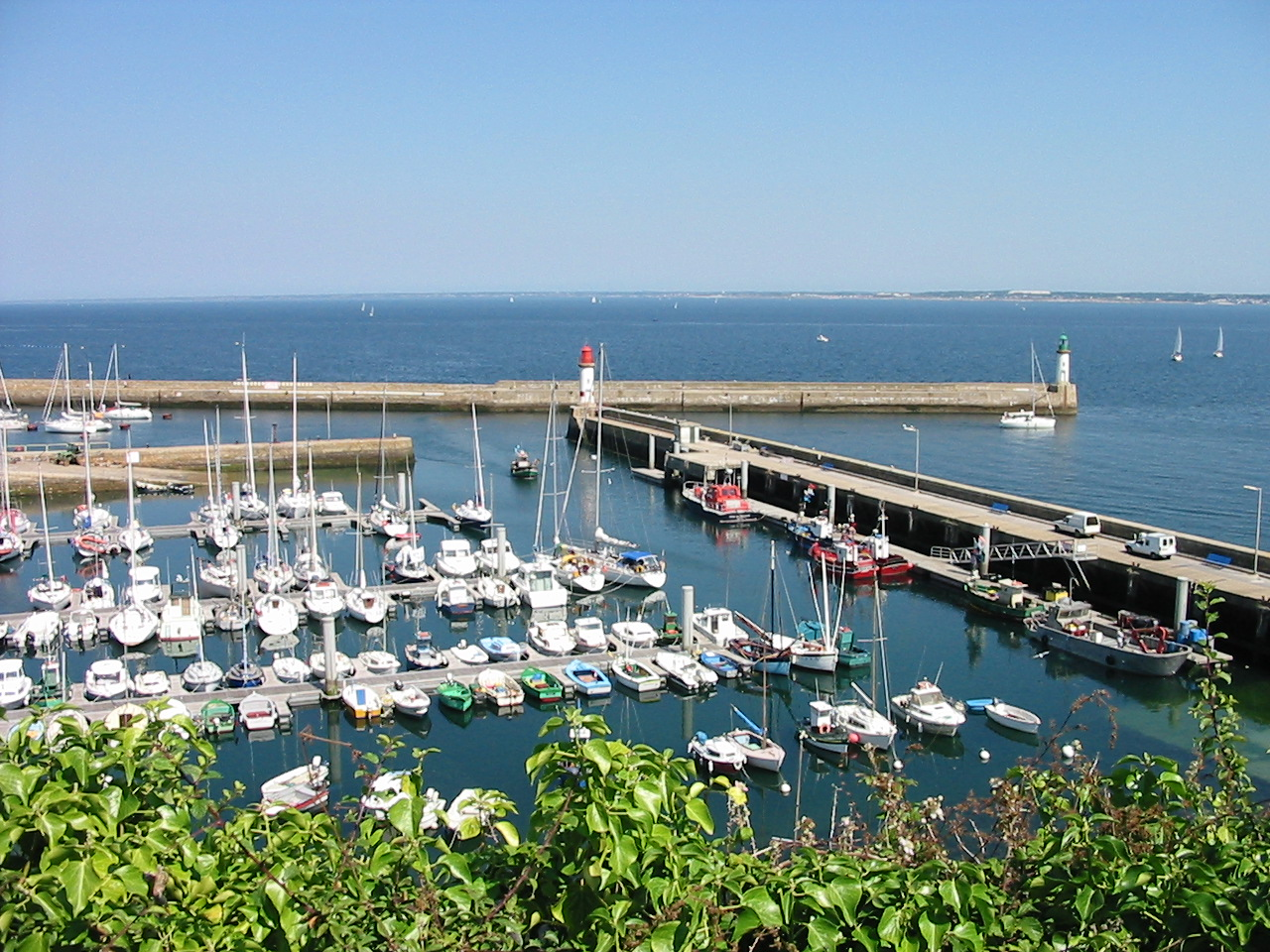
Port Tudy, main harbor of Groix

== See also ==
- Communes of the Morbihan department
- Yann-Ber Kalloc'h

== Bibliography ==
- "Gildas, the cabin boy from Groix" 2007 by the students of College Saint Tudy-ile de Groix-*
