= Ploemeur =

Ploemeur Plañvour (Breton)
- Commune
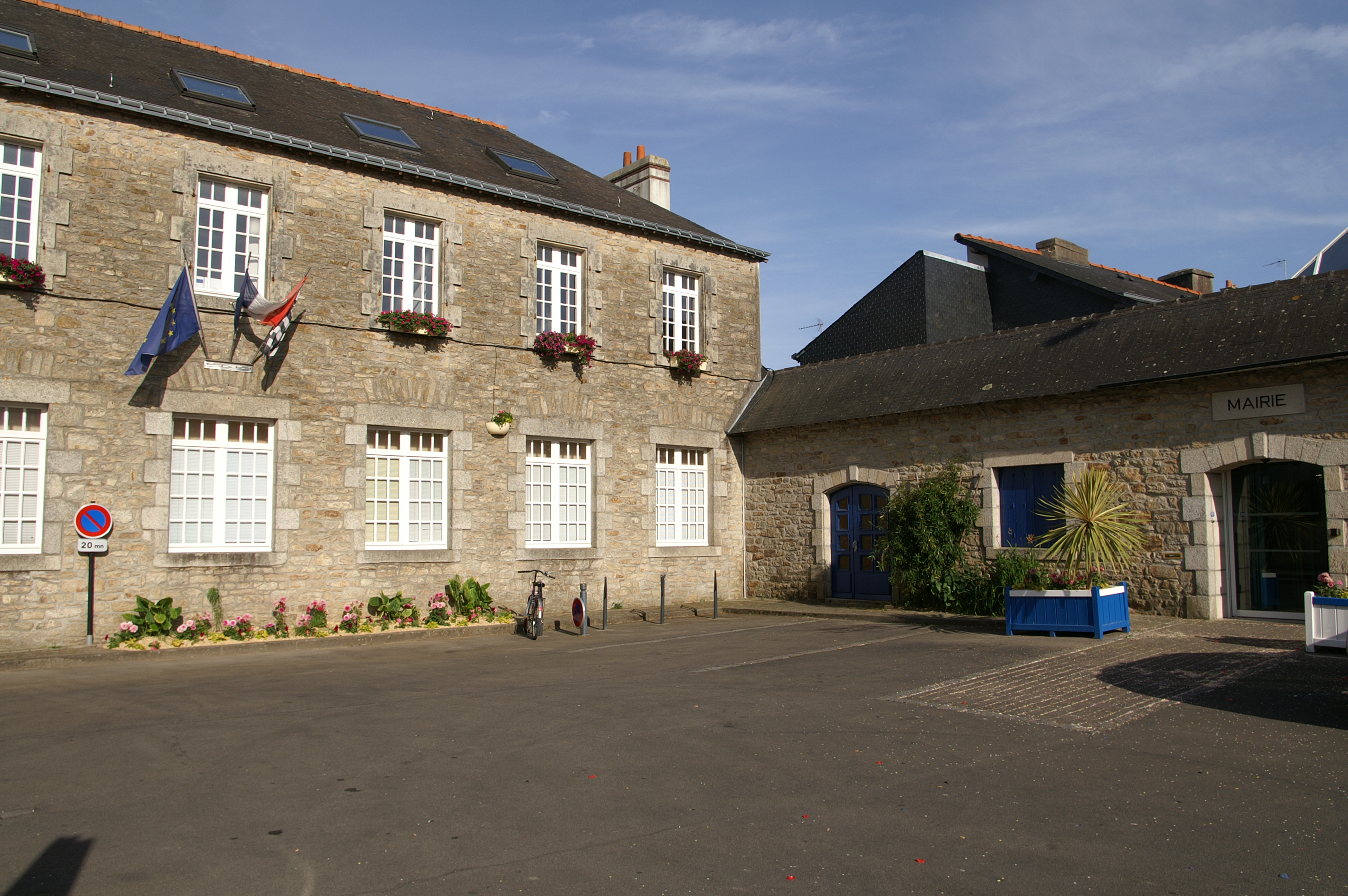
- The town hall in Ploemeur

- Coat of arms
- Location of Ploemeur
- Location within France Location within Brittany
- Coordinates: 47°44′14″N 3°25′34″W
- Country: France
- Region: Brittany
- Department: Morbihan
- Arrondissement: Lorient
- Canton: Ploemeur
- Intercommunality: Lorient Agglomération

Government
  - Mayor (2026–32): Ronan Loas
- Area^{1}: 39.72 km^{2} (15.34 sq mi)
- Highest elevation: 55 m (180 ft)
- Lowest elevation: −1 m (−3.3 ft)
- Population (2023): 18,872
  - Density: 475.1/km^{2} (1,231/sq mi)
- Time zone: UTC+01:00 (CET)
  - Summer (DST): UTC+02:00 (CEST)
- INSEE/Postal code: 56162 /56270
- ^{1} French Land Register data, which excludes lakes, ponds, glaciers > 1 km^{2} (0.386 sq mi or 247 acres) and river estuaries.

Ploemeur (French pronunciation: [plømœʁ]; Breton: Plañvour), sometimes written instead as Plœmeur, is a commune in the Morbihan department in the region of Brittany in north-western France. It is a western suburb of Lorient.

== Population ==
The inhabitants are called the Ploemeurois. The municipality launched a linguistic plan to promote and stimulate the use of the Breton language through Ya d'ar brezhoneg on 18 April 2006.

Historical population
Year	Pop.	±% p.a.
1968	7,089	—
1975	9,565	+4.37%
1982	13,455	+5.00%
1990	17,637	+3.44%
1999	18,304	+0.41%
2007	18,509	+0.14%
2012	17,875	−0.69%
2017	17,853	−0.02%
2023	18,872	+0.93%
Source: INSEE

== Etymology ==
The current name of the city of Ploemeur comes from the old Breton Plo Meur meaning "Big Parish".

== Geography ==
Ploemeur is close to Lorient (Breton: An Oriant), a sub-prefecture of Morbihan.

== Photographs of the Port of Lomener ==
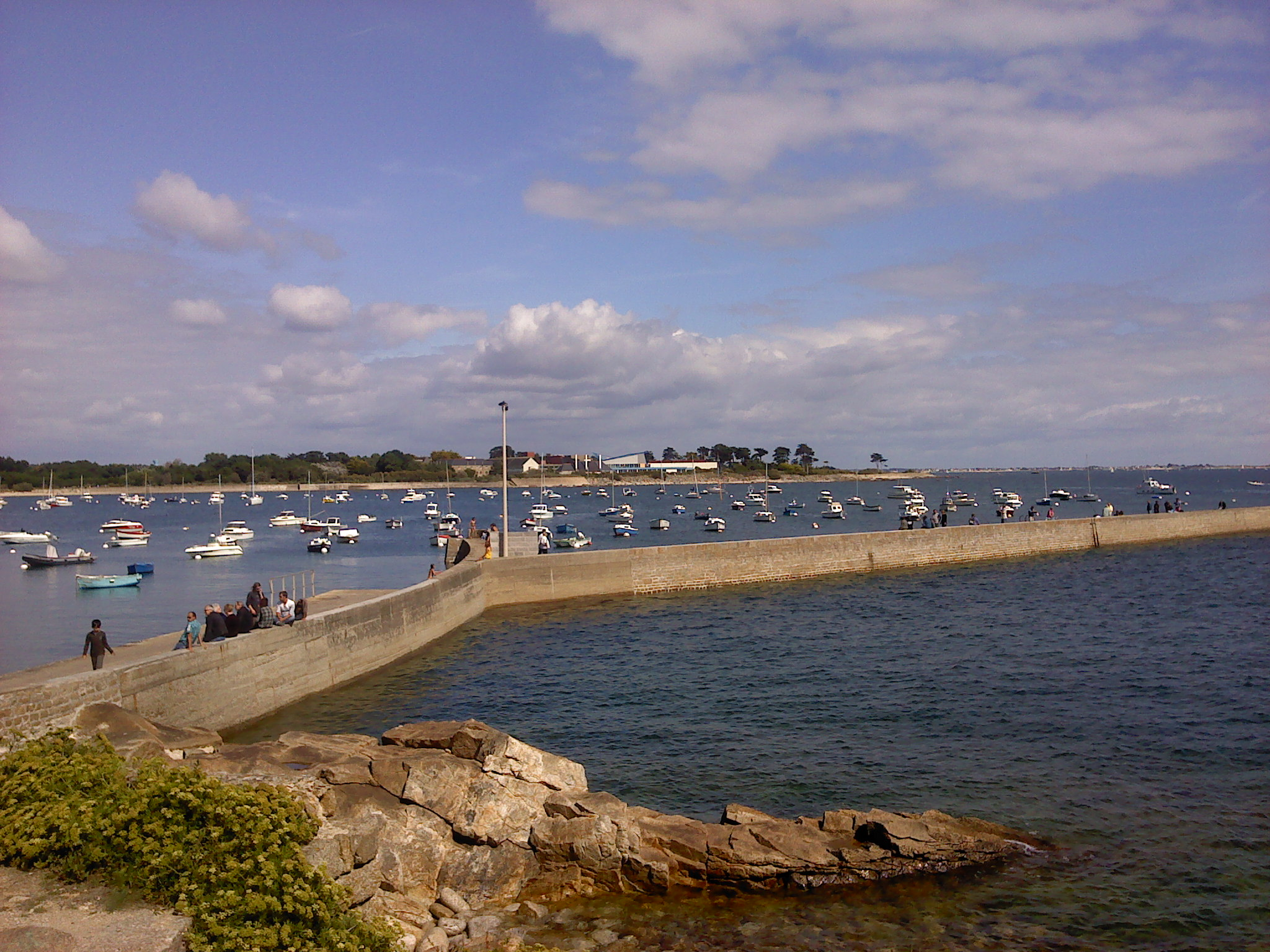
The pier

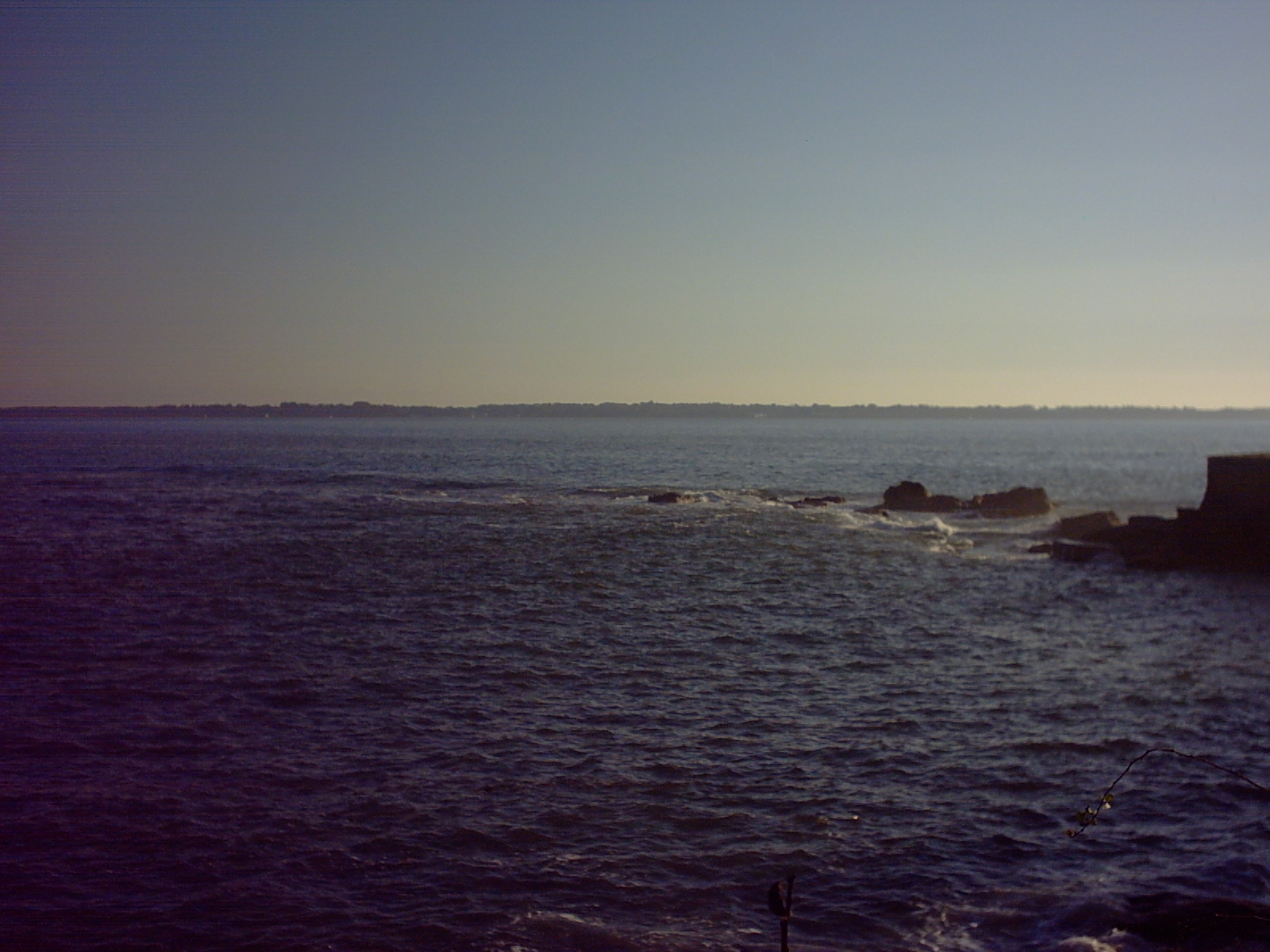
The Island of Groix at the horizon

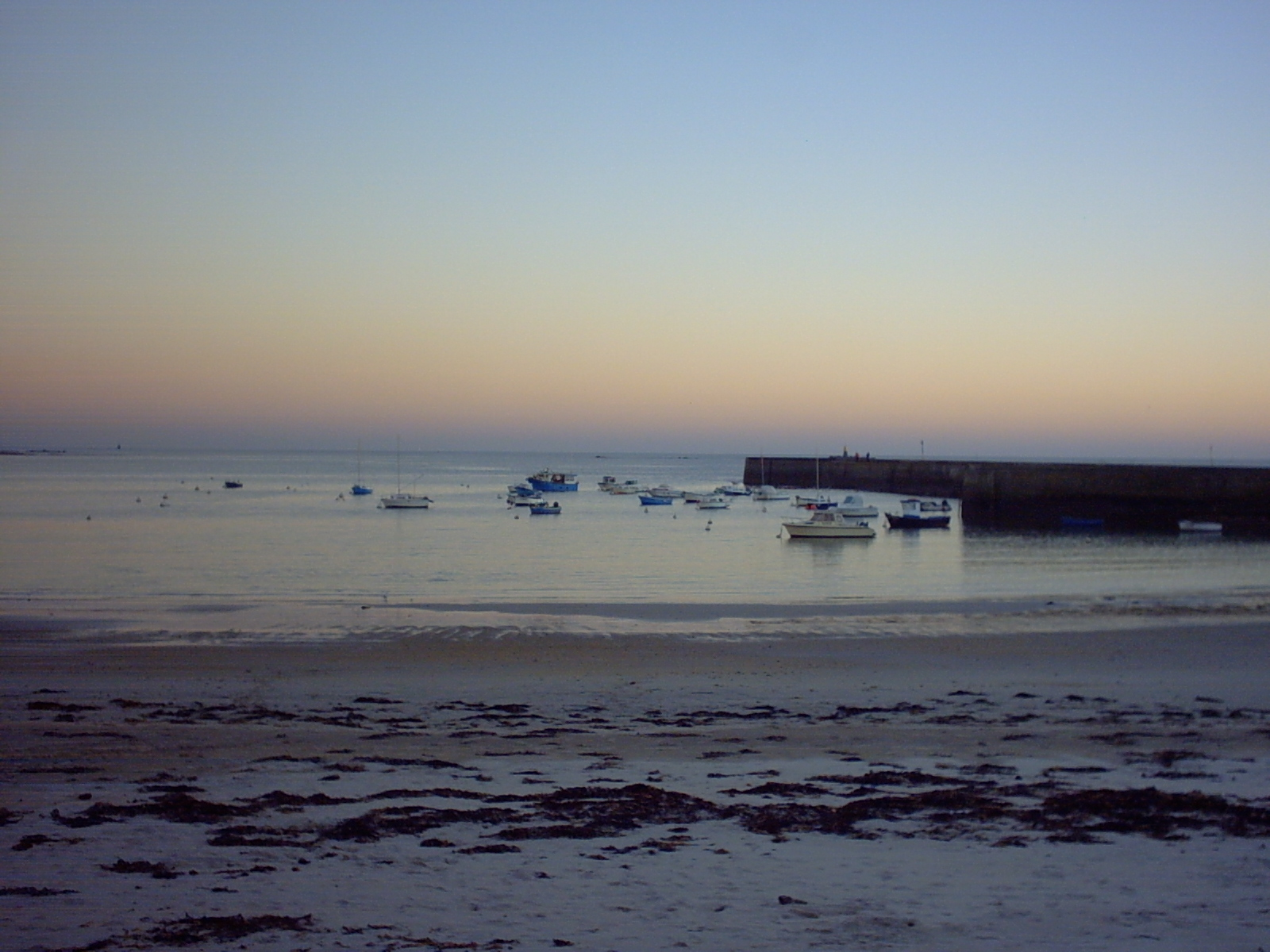
End of the day on the port

== People ==
- Nathalie Appéré, Mayor of Rennes
- Stanislas Dupuy de Lôme (1816 in the Château de Soye - †1885), who built the first armored battleship.
- Yoann Gourcuff, born on 11 July 1986, is a footballer of Olympique Lyonnais and of the France national team.
- Diego Yesso, footballer

== International relations ==
Ploemeur is twinned with:

- Diksmuide, Belgium
- (Republic of Ireland) Fermoy, Ireland
- Nowa Dęba, Poland

== See also ==
- Communes of the Morbihan department
