= Canton of Ploemeur =

Coordinates: 47.74°N 3.43°W

The canton of Ploemeur is an administrative division of the Morbihan department, northwestern France. Its borders were modified at the French canton reorganisation which came into effect in March 2015. Its seat is in Ploemeur.

It consists of the following communes:

1. Larmor-Plage
2. Ploemeur
3. Quéven
