= Canton of Vannes-1 =

Coordinates: 47.66°N 2.76°W

The canton of Vannes-1 is an administrative division of the Morbihan department, northwestern France. It was created at the French canton reorganisation which came into effect in March 2015. Its seat is in Vannes.

It consists of the following communes:

1. Vannes (partly)
