= Morbihan =

Department of France

Morbihan Morbihan (Gallo) Mor-Bihan (Breton)
- Department
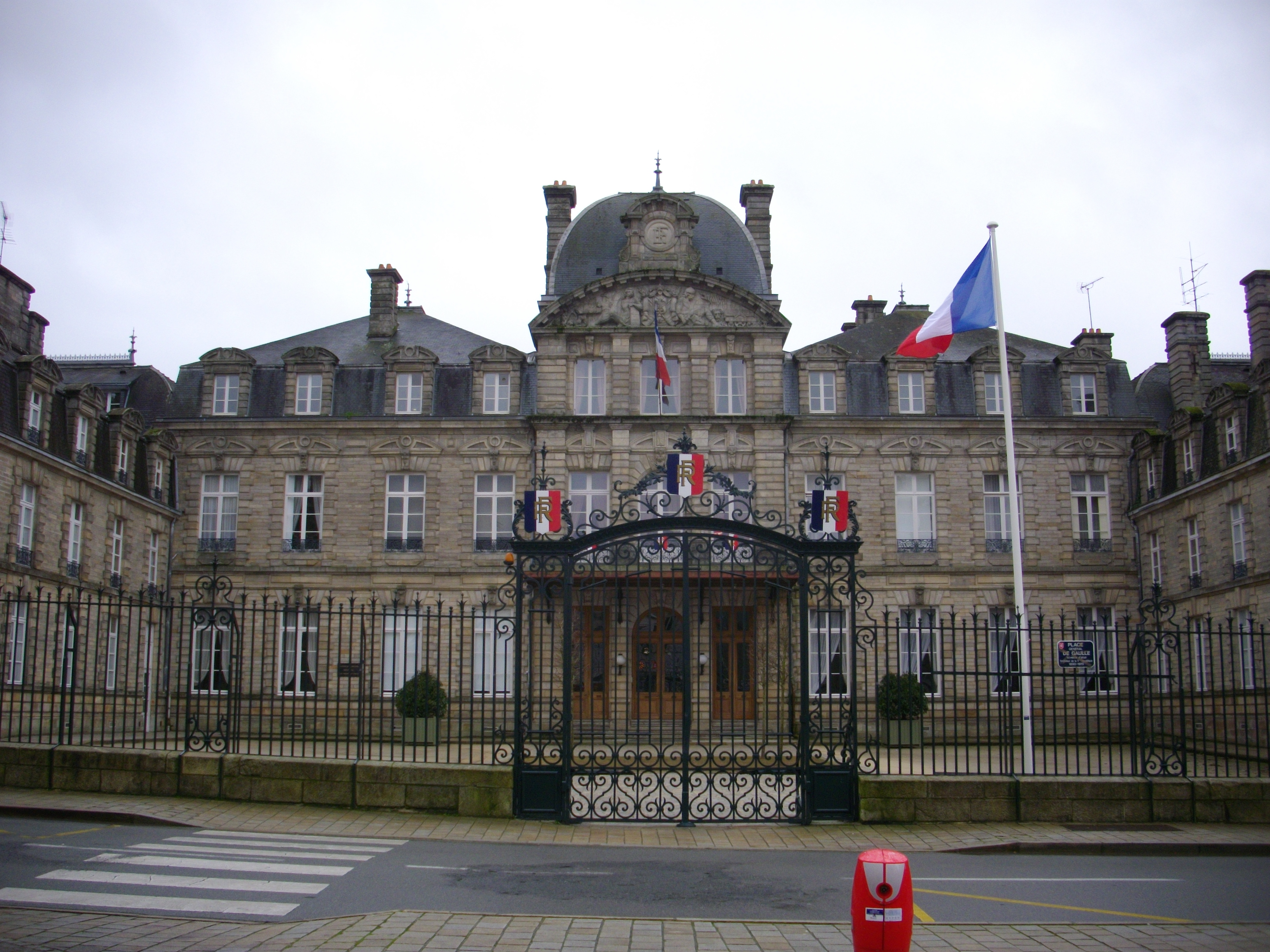
- Prefecture building of the Morbihan department, in Vannes

- Flag Coat of arms

- Location of the Morbihan in France

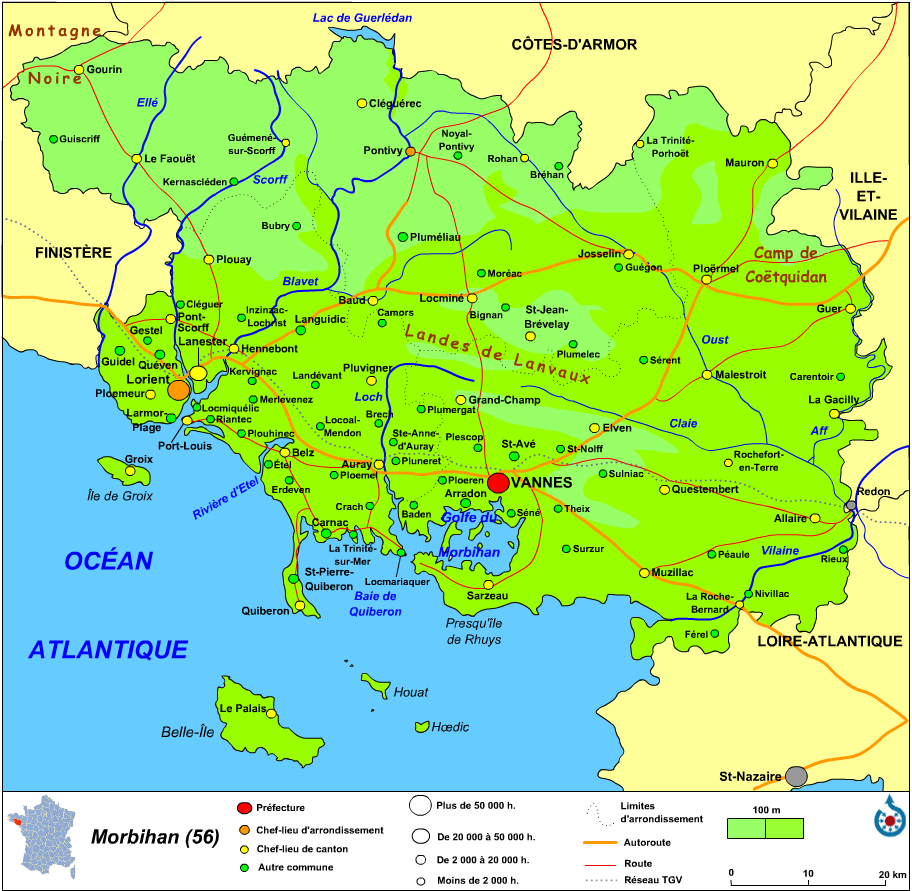
- Map of the Morbihan
- Coordinates: 47°50′N 02°50′W
- Country: France
- Region: Brittany
- Prefecture: Vannes
- Subprefectures: Lorient; Pontivy

Government
  - President of the Departmental Council: David Lappartient

Area^{1}
  - Total: 6,823 km^{2} (2,634 sq mi)

Population (2023)
  - Total: 783,390
  - Rank: 31st
  - Density: 114.8/km^{2} (297.4/sq mi)
- Time zone: UTC+1 (CET)
  - Summer (DST): UTC+2 (CEST)
- ISO 3166 code: FR-56
- Department number: 56
- Arrondissements: 3
- Cantons: 21
- Communes: 249
- ^1 French Land Register data, which exclude estuaries, and lakes, ponds, and glaciers larger than 1 km^{2}

The Morbihan department (/mɔːrbiˈɒ̃/ mor-bee-ON; French: [mɔʁbi(j)ɑ̃]; Gallo: Morbihan, Breton: Mor-Bihan [moːrˈbiː(h)ãn]) is a department in the administrative region of Brittany, situated in the northwest of France. It is named after the Morbihan (small sea in Breton), the enclosed sea that is the principal feature of the coastline. It had a population of 783,390 in 2023. It is noted for its Carnac stones, which predate and are more extensive than the Stonehenge monument in Wiltshire, England.

Three major military educational facilities are located in Guer, including École Spéciale Militaire de Saint-Cyr, the national military academy for officers.

== History ==
The Morbihan is one of the original 83 departments created on 4 March 1790 during the French Revolution. It was created from a part of the Province of Brittany.

In 1945, cadets from École Spéciale Militaire de Saint-Cyr, France's foremost military academy for officers, were relocated to Camp Coëtquidan (Camp de Coëtquidan) in Guer. This has been developed to include also the École militaire interarmes (inter-services military school), for non-commissioned officers; and École Militaire du Corps Technique et Administratif (military school of the technical and administrative corps).

== Geography ==
The Morbihan, part of the region of Brittany, is surrounded by the departments of Finistère, Côtes-d'Armor, Ille-et-Vilaine, and Loire-Atlantique, and the Atlantic Ocean on the southwest.

The Gulf of Morbihan has many islands: 365 according to legend. There are actually between 30 and 40, depending on how they are counted. There are also many islets that are too small for any development. Of these islands, all but two are privately owned: l'Île-aux-Moines and l'Île-d'Arz. Owners of the others include movie stars, fashion designers, and other wealthy "glitterati".

In the department of the Morbihan, but outside the Gulf, there are four inhabited islands:

- Belle Île
- Groix
- Houat
- Hoëdic

Meaban, an island just outside the Port du Crouesty, is an ornithological reserve. Visitors are forbidden there.

=== Principal towns ===
The most populous commune is Lorient; the prefecture Vannes is the second-most populous. As of 2023, there are 5 communes with more than 15,000 inhabitants:

| Commune | Population (2023) |
|---|---|
| Lorient | 58,329 |
| Vannes | 55,790 |
| Lanester | 23,263 |
| Ploemeur | 18,872 |
| Hennebont | 15,910 |

== Demographics ==
Historical population

| Year | Pop. | ±% p.a. |
|---|---|---|
| 1801 | 401,215 | — |
| 1821 | 416,224 | +0.18% |
| 1831 | 433,522 | +0.41% |
| 1841 | 447,898 | +0.33% |
| 1851 | 478,172 | +0.66% |
| 1861 | 486,504 | +0.17% |
| 1876 | 506,573 | +0.27% |
| 1881 | 521,614 | +0.59% |
| 1891 | 544,470 | +0.43% |
| 1901 | 564,000 | +0.35% |
| 1921 | 556,047 | −0.07% |
| 1936 | 542,000 | −0.17% |

| Year | Pop. | ±% p.a. |
|---|---|---|
| 1946 | 506,884 | −0.67% |
| 1954 | 520,966 | +0.34% |
| 1962 | 530,833 | +0.23% |
| 1968 | 540,474 | +0.30% |
| 1975 | 563,588 | +0.60% |
| 1982 | 590,889 | +0.68% |
| 1990 | 619,838 | +0.60% |
| 1999 | 643,873 | +0.42% |
| 2007 | 702,487 | +1.10% |
| 2012 | 732,372 | +0.84% |
| 2017 | 750,863 | +0.50% |
| 2023 | 783,390 | +0.71% |

== Art and culture ==
Many residents support maintenance and use of the Breton language, and there are numerous advocates of bilingual education.

The painter Raymond Wintz (1884–1956) depicted locations around the Gulf of Morbihan.

== Politics ==
As of 2014, the préfet of the Morbihan is Jean-François Savy, previously head of the Prefectures of Ardennes and of Hautes-Alpes. The president of the Departmental Council is David Lappartient, elected in July 2021.

=== Current National Assembly Representatives ===
| Constituency | Member | Party |
|---|---|---|
| Morbihan's 1st constituency | Anne Le Hénanff | Horizons |
| Morbihan's 2nd constituency | Jimmy Pahun | MoDem |
| Morbihan's 3rd constituency | Nicole Le Peih | Renaissance |
| Morbihan's 4th constituency | Paul Molac | Régions et Peuples Solidaires |
| Morbihan's 5th constituency | Damien Girard | The Ecologists |
| Morbihan's 6th constituency | Jean-Michel Jacques | Renaissance |

== Tourism ==
- The Carnac stones, megalithic alignments of Carnac, are situated in the Morbihan.
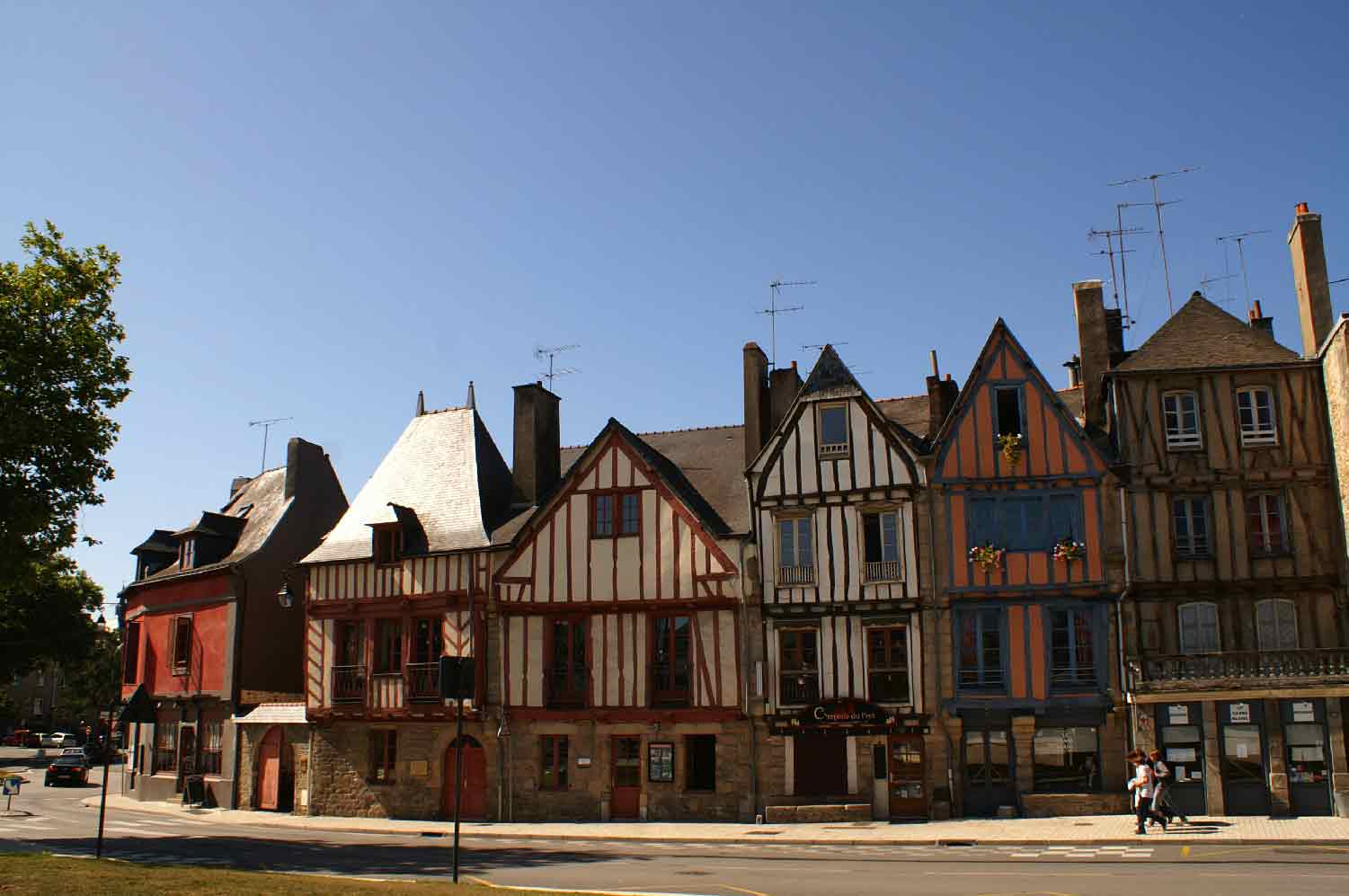
Vannes

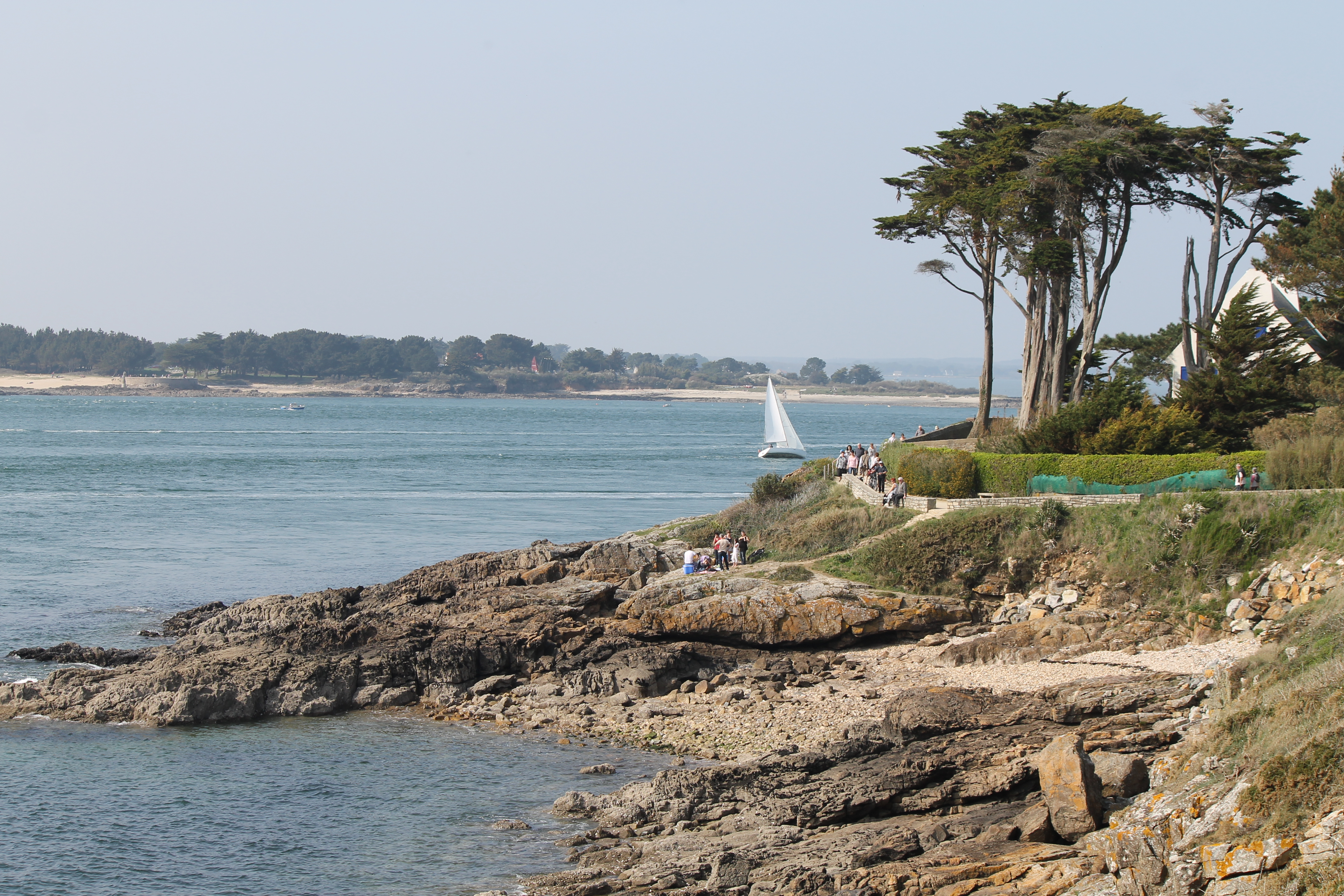
The Gulf of Morbihan is a popular sailing destination.

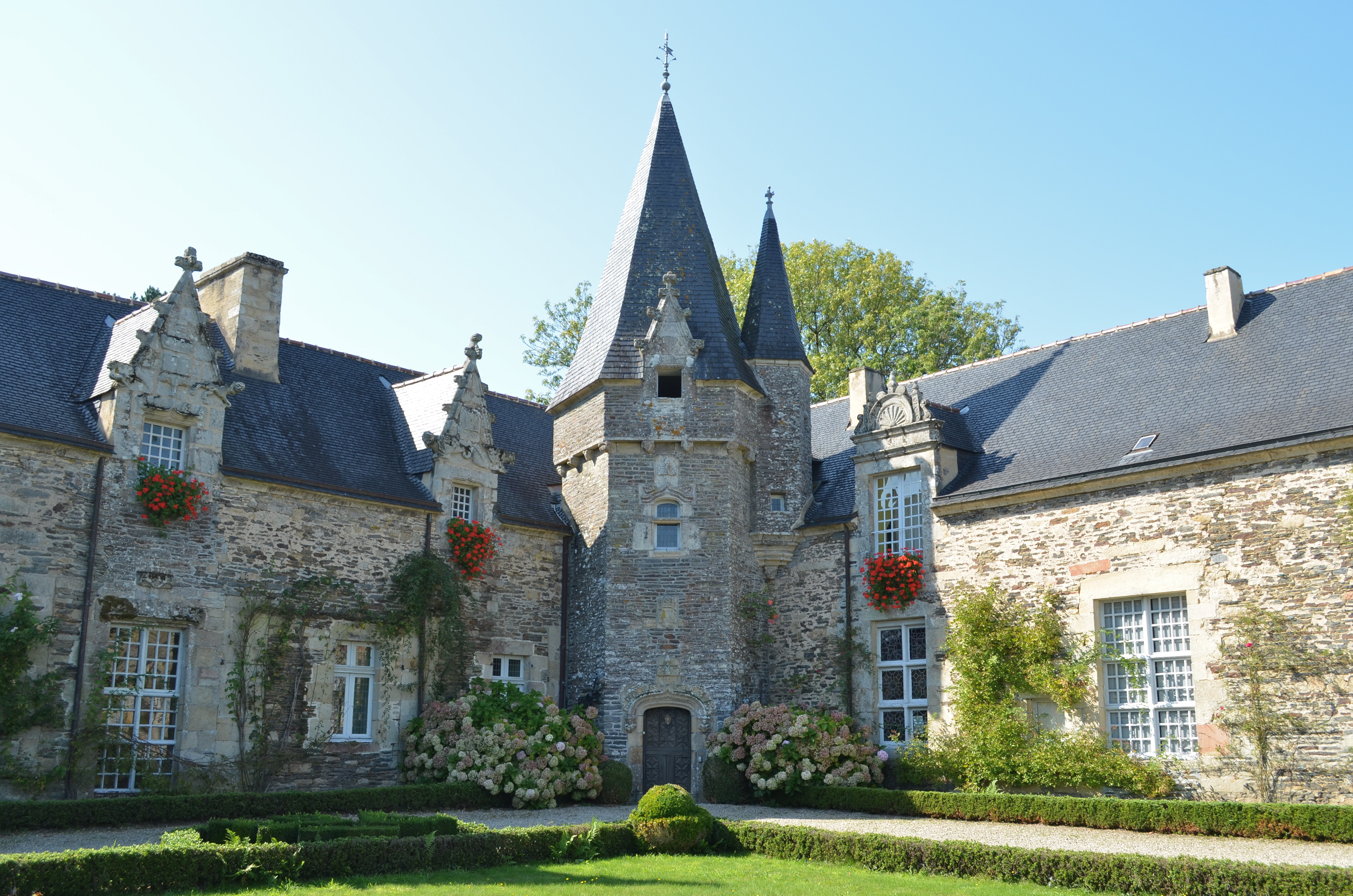
Rochefort-en-Terre

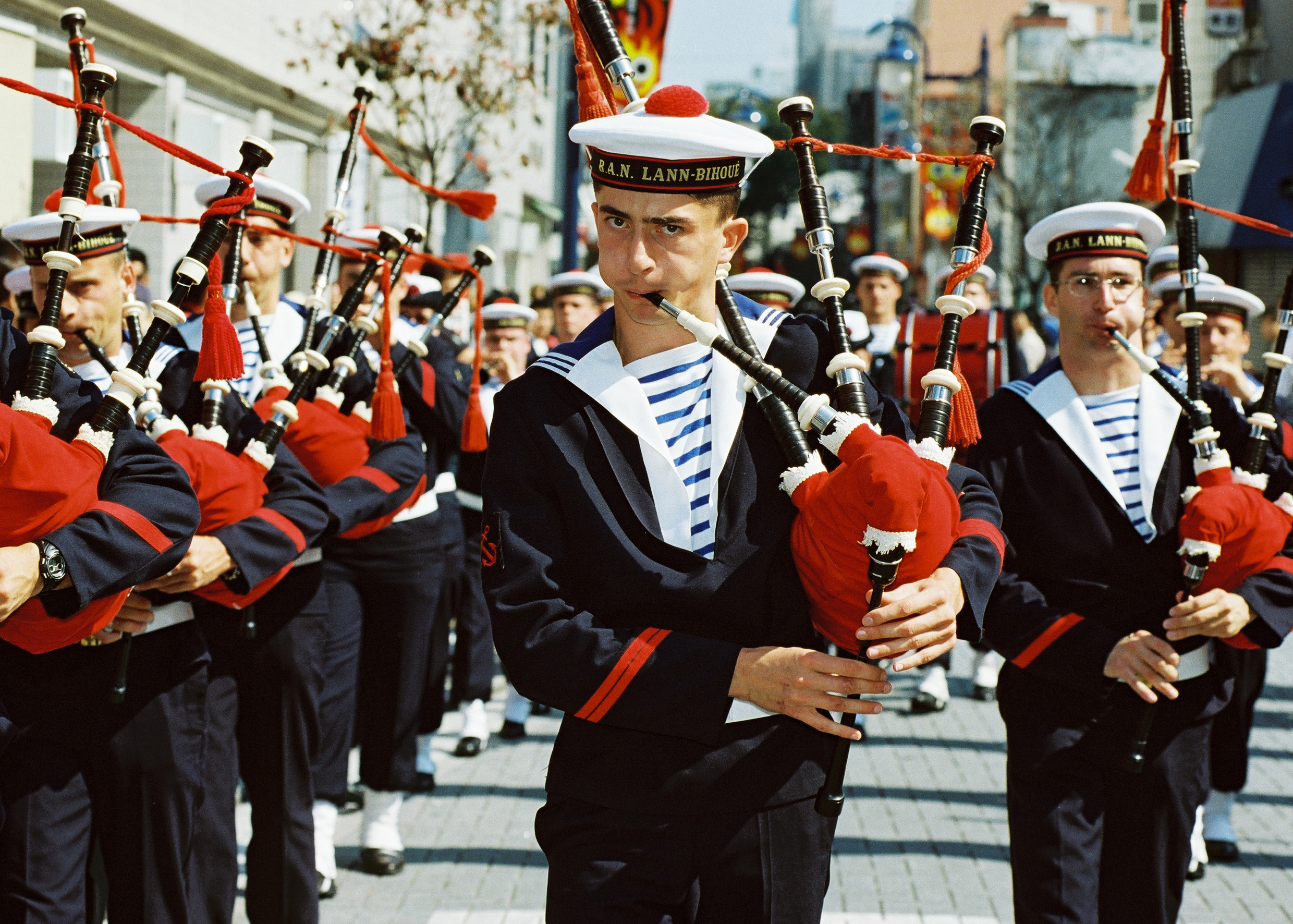
The bagad of Lann-Bihoué

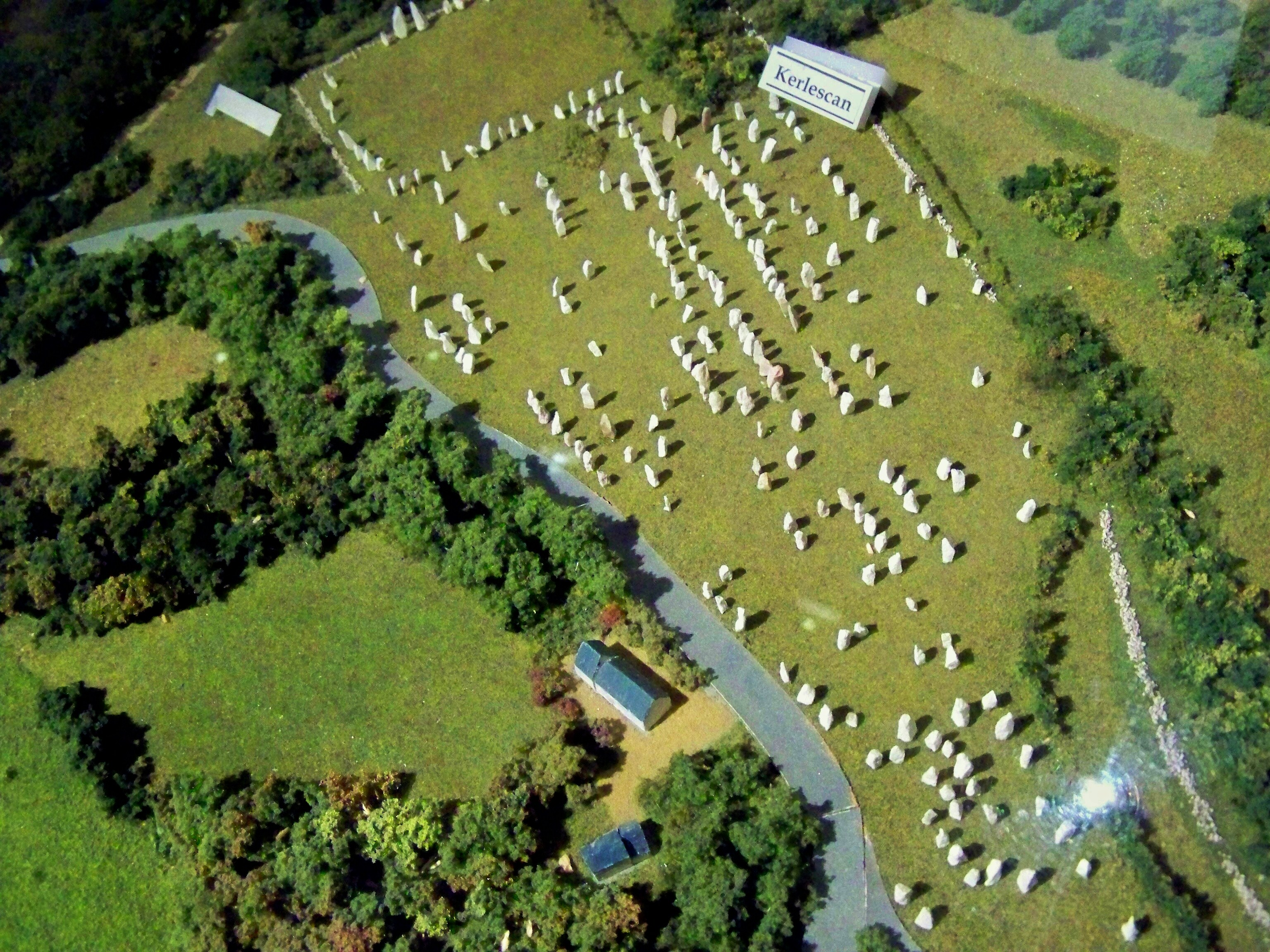
Carnac stones

== See also ==
- Cantons of the Morbihan department
- Communes of the Morbihan department
- Arrondissements of the Morbihan department
- La Baule - Guérande Peninsula
