= Horses in Breton culture =

Equine presence in Breton culture

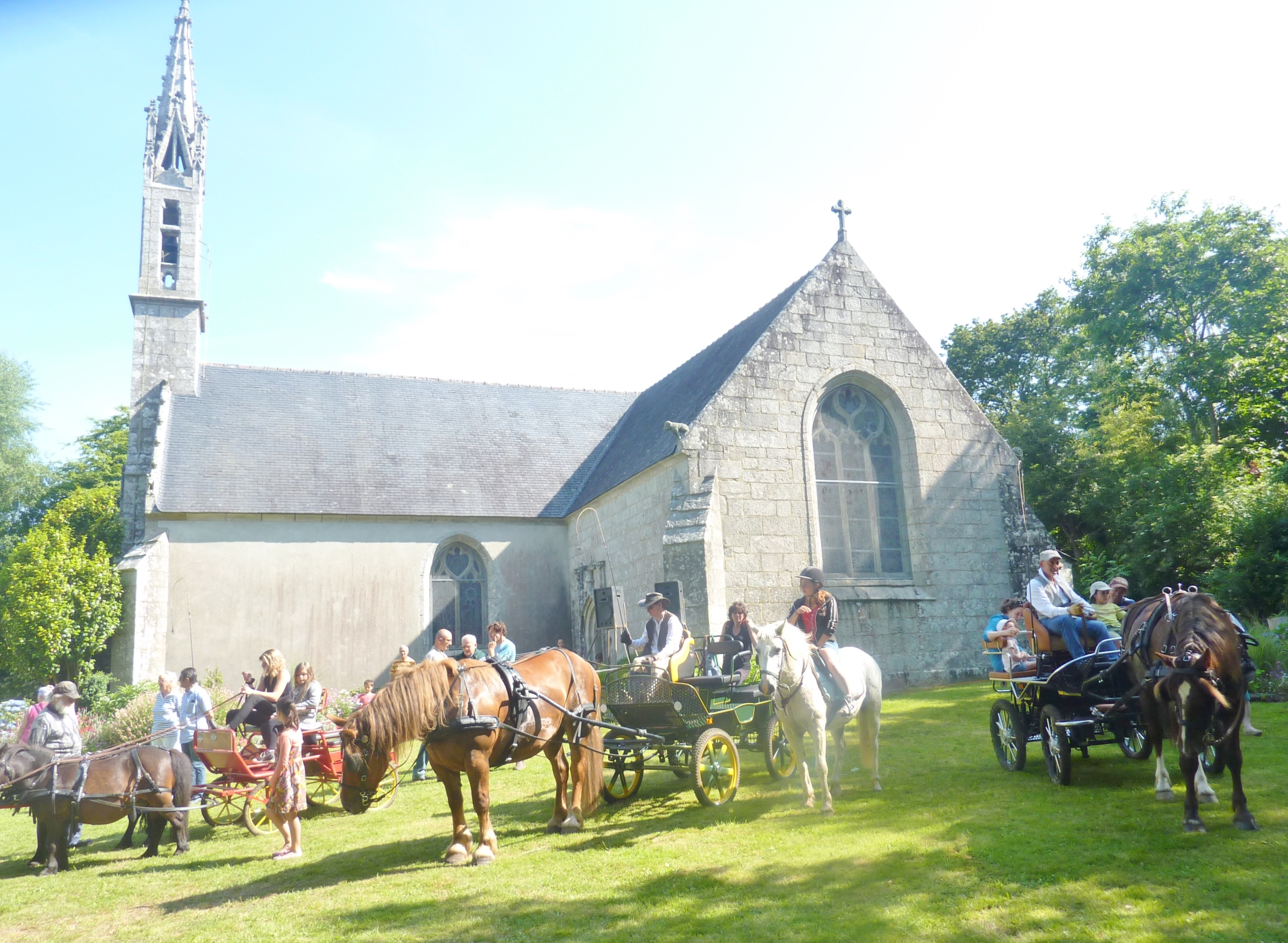
A horse pardon in Clohars-Fouesnant in the chapel of Le Drennec, July 2013.

The presence of horses in Breton culture (Breton: kezeg) is reflected in the strong historical attachment of the Bretons to this animal, and in religious and secular traditions, sometimes seen from the outside as part of local folklore. Probably revered since ancient times, the horse is the subject of rites, witchcraft, proverbs and numerous superstitions, sometimes involving other animals.

Pardons are reserved for horses. These specifically Breton ceremonies, derived from ancient fertility rites, involve the symbolism of water. St. Eloi's Day attracts pilgrims from all over France. Symbolically linked to the sea via legends such as Morvarc'h, and to death with the Ankou or the Mallet horse, the horse is also present in tales, songs, many traditional stories, and in the Brittany roll of arms. These traditions were clearly folklorized in the 20th century. Pierre-Jakez Hélias popularized the equestrian traditions of the Bigoudend region in his novel The Horse of Pride, which was adapted for the cinema.

== General information ==
The special cultural status accorded to the horse in Brittany stems from the fact that farmers have always been very attached to this animal. Until the beginning of the 20th century the horse was part of the family. Used as a means of locomotion, it was associated with all of life's events. Its presence in large numbers at popular gatherings, such as pardons, fairs or even weddings, was also an opportunity to organize cavalcades and races. It's both a work tool and a source of pride. Farm size is even measured in terms of the number of horses. According to Éphrem Houël, this pride is so great "that it is not uncommon to see, on market days, very lightly loaded carts coming to the towns, pulled by five or six strong horses". This custom is especially common in the Léon region. Paul Sébillot relates a proverb: "Bon dieu d'en haut, prends ma femme, laisse les chevaux" (Take my wife, leave the horses). For Breton people, Landivisiau is also a symbol of the horse trade. The link with the legends of Brittany is permanent. Éphrem Houël links the regions where chivalry is celebrated with the quality of horse breeding:

The glory of chivalry [...] must go in part to Brittany: it was in its cool valleys that the steeds of Tristan du Léonnais and the Preux of the Round Table rose; it was on its wild hills that the cavales of the tender Guinevere and Iseult of Cornwall leapt

— Ephrem Houël

Today the European tourist market is leading to a "folklorization" of these equestrian traditions, particularly those of the farming world. In 1986, the Institut Culturel de Bretagne, the Atelier de Création Audiovisuelle and the Société d'Ethnologie Bretonne filmed the video documentary Gwad Keseg (Breton for "horse's blood"), about horse-breeding in Lower Brittany. It was produced and commented by Kristen Noguès, Breiz multimedia and the audio-visual creation workshop in Saint-Cadou, Finistère. Breeders from Lower Brittany evoke their gwad keseg to talk about the passion for horses that's "in their blood".

== Worship and religious traditions ==
=== In ancient times ===
The horse was certainly worshipped by various Armorican tribes, with the cult of the warrior's steed gradually replacing that of a probable Neolithic mother goddess. The very popular Gallic goddess Epona, protector of horses, is worshipped by both Gauls and Roman cavalry units. There is no evidence of her worship in present-day Brittany. White clay statuettes discovered in the 19th century, and a bronze statuette found at Baye, suggest the veneration of an equestrian goddess among the people of Armorique, perhaps a local variant of Epona. The goddess worshipped in Ménez Hom is strongly reminiscent of Athena, the Greek goddess associated with the horse. The arrival of Christianity transformed the cult of the horse, introducing saints in particular.

=== Pardon for horses ===
Bretons know many saints associated with horses: Éloi (against illness), Gildas (fertility and protection rite at the Penvenan pardon), Hervé, Nicodème, Herbot, Cornély, Vincent. Salomon de Bretagne (857-874) is considered a patron saint of cavalrymen, a status he certainly achieved thanks to his military role in Brittany's cavalry. Saint Teilo is invoked to achieve military victory with cavalry.

The loss of a horse is often a tragedy for a farming family. Before the advent of veterinary medicine, there were few ways to prevent it. That's why the Bretons call on many of these saints during horse pardons. These pardons combine sacred and secular traditions. Pilgrims travel a short distance on the animal to be blessed. There is competition between pardons. It's a popular festival dedicated to horses, which are forbidden to work on this day. It brings the whole village together, and has an important identity function. It has ancient roots. The bathing of horses is attested to as a fertility rite in many parts of the world, notably in Celtic countries. Most horse pardons are held on June 24 or July, the day of the relics of Saint Eloi or the feast of Saint John. They correspond to important moments in the Celtic calendar. On these occasions, the horses are well fed and groomed.

Prayer to Saint Éloi, in Breton	English translation
Aotrou Sant-Alar beniget, Hoc'h assistans 'zo goulennet Da breservi diouzh peb tra Hor loened ar re wella, Da genta hor c'heseg e keneb [...]	Blessed Saint-Eloy, Bring us your help To protect from harm our best animals First our mares in foal [...]

Anatole Le Braz reports that the horse is led around the shrine three times, before being forced to bow to the image of the saint. The animal's owner makes an offering: money, horseshoes or, more frequently, a handful of horsehair. In Gourin, he gives his horse's tail. After the service, the priest blesses the animal, sometimes offering a piece of blessed bread. A procession sets off towards the saint's statue, or carrying it. Water remains omnipresent during the rite itself. Ears, genitals, rump or hooves may be sprinkled in a fountain to invoke healing, protection or the birth of a foal. Bathing or jumping in a river is a fertility rite, sometimes accompanied by on-the-spot breeding. Races and cavalcades may accompany the ritual, as may the lighting of a bonfire. These races are an opportunity for young men to measure themselves, and for villages to gain in reputation: it's not uncommon for them to end in meetings and marriages. On the sidelines, discussions focus on the merits of each horse. Young children can learn to ride for the first time.

So popular was this rite that in Quistinic, the number of people who attended the pardon in July led to the construction of a new fountain in the 19th century. The pardon aux chevaux subsequently underwent a gradual process of folklorization. By the 1950s, it had become a show for tourists. In the 1960s and 1970s, tractors and other machines replaced the horses. In Saint-Éloy, the pardon on Ascension Thursday still attracts devotees from all over France. The same goes for Saint-Péver, where horses have been bathing in a pond since 1888. Salomon de Bretagne still has its own pardon at the chapel in Plouyé. Many chapels hold ex-votos from horse owners.

== Magic and secular beliefs ==
Alongside religious rites and appeals to holy healers, there is a long tradition of caring for horses through magic, secular beliefs and the use of witchcraft or bewitchment on animals, right up to the 1950s. Many of these beliefs are detailed, specifically for horses, in an anonymous work published in Vannes in 1694: Les Maladies des Chevaux, avec leurs remèdes faciles et expérimentez. It recommends purging with toad venom, supposed to induce beneficial diarrhea. To prick a worm with a hawthorn thorn would instantly kill all other worms infecting the horse. A belief persisted into the 20th century that a horse that ate a spider would "swell up all over" due to the venom and risk death. In the 19th century, white hawthorn was reputed to cure lameness. The animal was brought in before sunrise. The Bretons invoke Saint Éloi (Sant Alar) at the birth of each foal to protect themselves and attract good luck to their animals.

=== Superstitions and beliefs ===
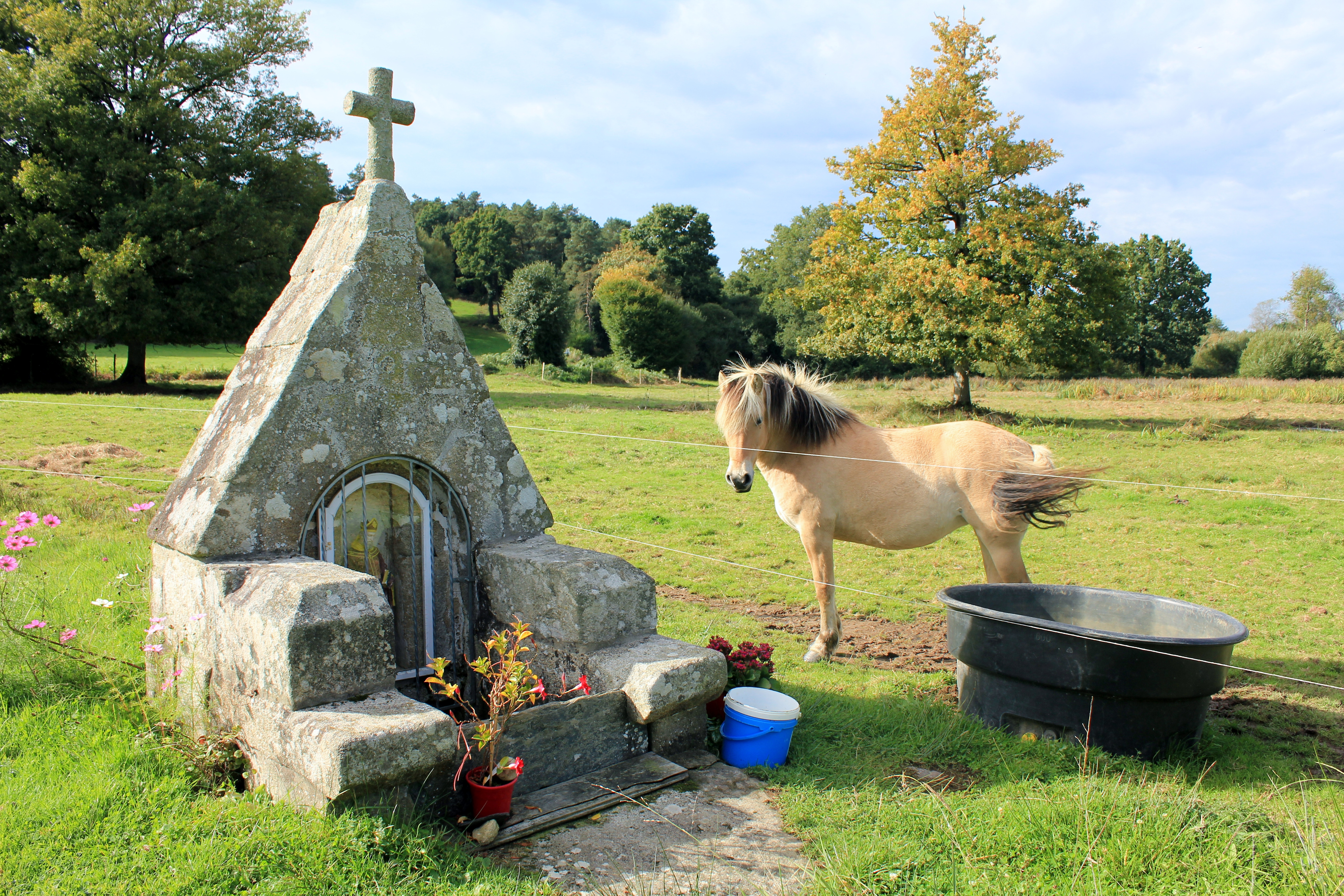
According to Breton belief, horses are sensitive to religious buildings. Here, the Saint-Gobrien fountain in Saint-Servant.

Bretons are reputed to be superstitious. Generally speaking, the presence of a toad has a negative influence on horses, as do small animals such as shrews, field mice, weasels and hedgehogs. In the Loire-Atlantique region, there is a belief dating back to the early 20th century that one should never clean stables in May, as snakes may colonize the premises. Similarly, to work with your horse or in the stable on Sunday or Friday (especially Good Friday), or to put your bread on your back, is to risk divine punishment that will result in the death of the horses. Other beliefs are linked to their color. An animal with four markings is said to be bad for butchery. The presence of hooves with white horns is highly frowned upon, and associated with weakness.

If trampled by the horse, stray grass could lead the animal to lose its way: a case has been recorded in Spézet. Horses are also said to be sensitive to the movement of sacred objects: in Elven, a man moved a cross and the horses passing by showed signs of irritation. He put it back in its place, and the animals' behavior returned to normal. Disrespect for the dead can also fall on the horse: Anatole Le Braz cites a man who preferred to collect hay rather than attend a wake, and whose horses all died without the vet finding any explanation. It would seem to be a revenge of the dead. On the contrary, as in many other parts of the world, horseshoes are reputed to be protective, especially when placed with the points upwards. It then captures the good fortune of the sky and transfers it to the place to be protected, where it is fixed. The custom of burying an animal dead from bewitchment with its legs in the air to protect the rest of the herd from bad luck is known from the end of the 17th century. The use of scapegoats was also common.

=== Witchcraft and horse healing ===
Witchcraft was clearly linked to the Devil as early as the 17th century: Father Maunoir blamed the Devil for his horse running off a bridge and falling into a river. Sorcerers who voluntarily pact with the Evil One are reputed to have powers over animals. A sorcerer could make a sick horse fall, but also weaken it by transferring the beast's forces onto himself. This sorcery is performed through the eyes. Certain creatures, such as the salamander (19th century), are reputed to kill oxen and horses with a glance. The sorcerer's magic also involves the spoken word. By praising a horse's plumpness, for example, he leaves open the threat that it won't last. Nailing, which consists in piercing the animal's heart or an effigy with nails, is mentioned as early as 1697 as a technique "that makes horses go crazy". Other techniques for returning the spell to the sender are also mentioned, such as placing (or burning) parts of the bewitched horse's corpse in the chimney. According to testimonies collected in the mid-20th century, it's possible to spot who has been a sorcerer in his or her life by observing the horses pulling the dead man's hearse on the day of his funeral: they either can't move the coffin, or start running around.

A herbal ointment called louzou is commonly used to heal wounds. The ritual and composition may vary. The healer can also use his breath. A testimonial from Saint-Congard tells of a wart healing that included blowing and drawing a cross with the other hand. The act of healing can prove trying for the healer, and become more difficult if the horse owner has strong emotional ties with his animal. The use of magic formulas is highly probable as early as the High Middle Ages. In the 17th century, the Bishop of Saint-Malo denounced them as diabolical. This is no doubt why the treatise on horse care published in Vannes in 1694 recommends a religious formula to cure colic, and why Abbé Thiers mentions the use of the sign of the cross to heal sprains. The formula for curing colic using Saint Éloi appears to be extremely common in the Breton countryside, as it is widely disseminated in grimoires and through oral tradition. Secular and religious formulas are different. The former set forces in motion through words, while the latter take the form of supplications to God and the saints, entrusting themselves to them. The use of various forms of magic has diminished considerably in Brittany, but it still exists. Magnetizers can use horsehair to heal from a distance, or soak hooves in magnetized water.

=== Relationships with lutins ===
Numerous relationships have been recorded between lutins and horses. At the end of the 19th century, Paul Sébillot provided evidence of the belief that lutins groom and feed horses, which in Upper Brittany causes horses to neigh with joy when Maît' Jean brings them their food.

Lutins are reputed to visit stables at night, leaving traces of their passage in the form of twisted manes, which they use to make stirrups (the famous "fairy knots"). Proof of the lutins' forfeit, the owner finds his animal covered in sweat in the morning. Horses with "fairy knots" are prized at Breton markets, and the mares are reputed to be good broodmares. Testimonies of tangled manes were collected by farmers in Upper Brittany right up to the beginning of the 20th century. Exorcism sessions were carried out, but were poorly accepted by the local population, according to this testimony collected by Paul Sébillot: "if you burn the manes with a blessed candle, the goblin never returns, but the animals are, as a result of his departure, exposed to withering away".

Paul Sébillot also relates popular beliefs about several horse lutins that lead travellers astray or drown them, including the Mourioche from Upper Brittany, the maître Jean, the Bugul-noz and the white mare from Bruz. In Spézet, lutins appear near a cross and send harnessed horses into a frenzy.

== Oral folk traditions and written collections ==
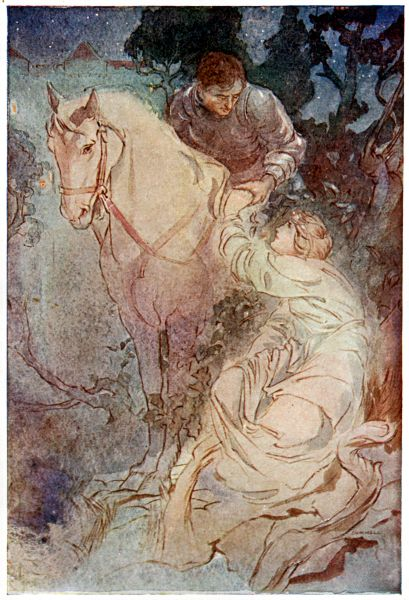
Gwennolaïk and Nola, Illustration by W. Otway Cannell for Legends & Romances of Brittany.

Oral traditions and songs often evoke the horse. While most are linked to the element of water, there are also several attestations of "Devil's horses" and symbolic associations between the animal and death (notably in Anatole Le Braz's collections) or the stars. On the island of Molène, where paganism has long been very present, the moon was nicknamed the "white mare" until the early 20th century.

The cart of Ankou, the personification of death in Lower Brittany, is pulled by one or more pale-white, silent, arrow-tied horses. They are sometimes described as skinny and gaunt, and sometimes the carriage includes one skinny and one fat horse. The description of the whole has its origins in peasant traditions, with the symbolic association of the color white with animals from the Celtic Other World. The last vision that the peasant has (especially in Trégor and Léon) is that which relates to his own existence. There is an analogy between the different gaits of the horse in reality and in Breton tradition. The Ankou horse walks at a walk, like the one that pulls the hearses. The traveling horse trots, and the Devil's horse gallops.

Horse racing is also present in the golden legend of Saint Guénolé, where Fracan and Riwalon measure their mounts. The popular song Marzhin barzh (bard Merlin) also celebrates horse racing:

Marzhin barzh, in Breton	English translation
E ebeul ruz en deus sternet Gant direnn-flamm 'neus hen houarnet :Ur c'habestr 'neus lakaet 'n e benn Hag un dorchenn skañv war e gein :E kerc'henn e c'houg ur walenn Hag en-dro d'e lost ur seizenn :Ha war e c'horre 'mañ pignet Hag er fest nevez degouezhet :E park ar fest pa oa degoue'et Oa ar gern-bual o vonet :Hag an holl dud en ur bagad Hag an holl virc'hed o lampat :« An hini en devo treuzet Kleun bras park ar fest en ur red :En ul lamm klok, distak, ha naet, Merc'h ar Rou' en do da bried » :E ebeulig ruz, pa glevas, War-bouez e benn a c'hristilhas :Lammat a reas, ha kounnariñ, Ha teurel c'hwezh tan gant e fri :Ha luc'hed gant e zaoulagad Ha darc'h en douar gant e droad :Ken a oa ar re all trec'het Hag ar c'hleun treuzet en ur red :« Aotroù Roue, 'vel peus touet, Ho merc'h Linor renkan kaouet »	He outfitted his red colt He shod him in polished steel He bridled him, And threw a light cover over his back. He tied a ring to his collar, And a ribbon on his tail. And mounted him, And arrived at the new feast; As he came to the feast field, The horns blew. The crowd was in a hurry, And every horse leaped. "He who shall gallop The great barrier of the festival field at full gallop, In one swift, frank and perfect leap, Shall have for wife the king's daughter". At these words, His young bay colt whinnied wildly, Leaped and raged, And breathed fire from his nostrils, And flashed lightning from his eyes, And struck the earth with his foot; All the others were overtaken And the barrier cleared with a leap. "Sire, you have sworn, Your daughter Linor must be mine."

=== Animal of the water ===
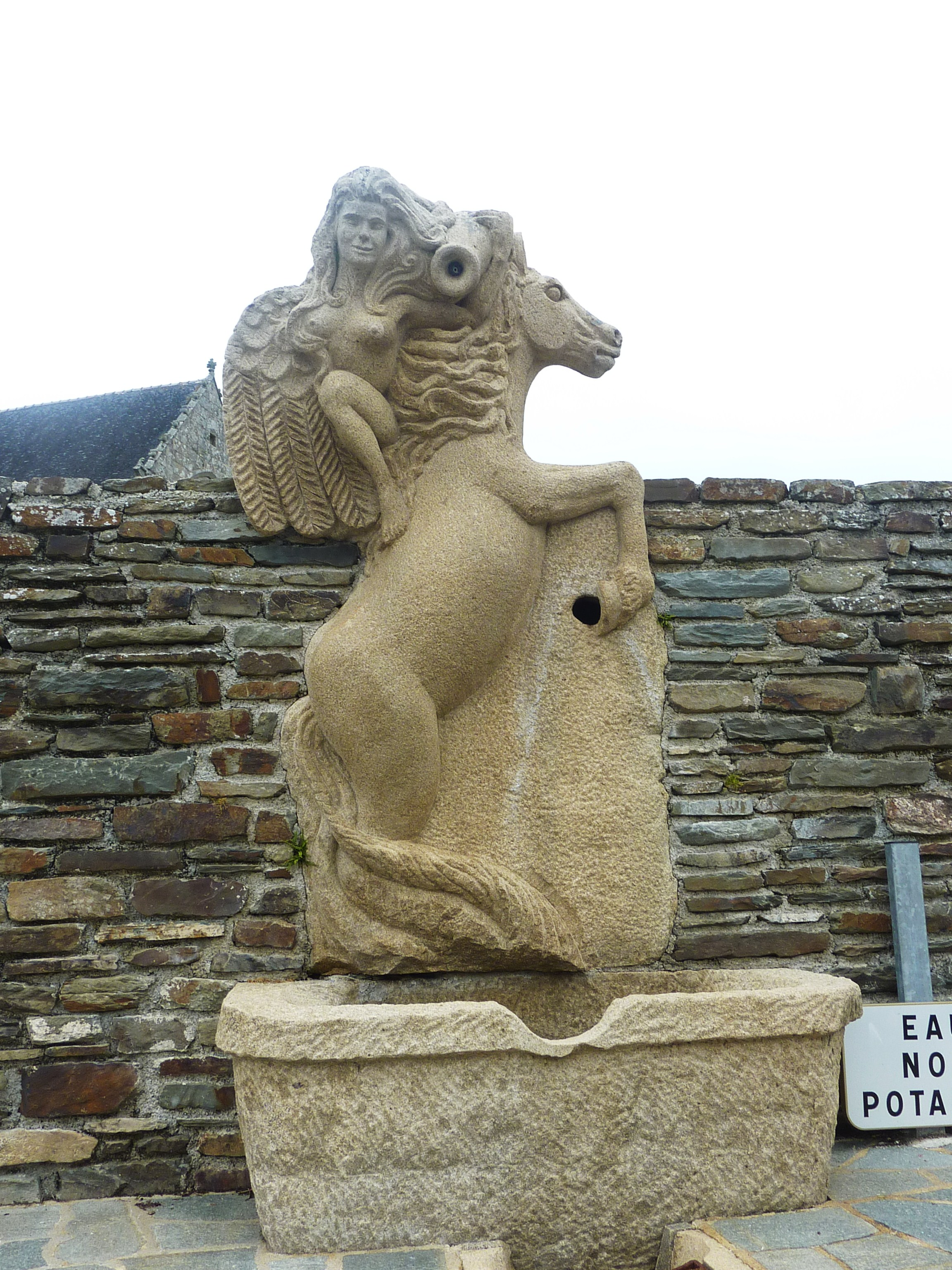
Cléden-Poher war memorial, associating the horse and the element of water.

As storyteller and writer Pierre Dubois reminds us, the fabulous horses of Breton tradition "reign over the sea". The name Morvarc'h, an animal from Cornish legends, means "sea horse". An equivalent, a white horse crossing the ocean to escape the waves, can be found in British Cornwall, which shares the same foundation of beliefs: the association between the horse and the sea is common to all Celtic countries. In the vita of Saint Malo (a Breton bishop), seeing his servant tied up and ready to be swallowed by the sea, the saint straddles his horse, frees him and leaves the animal in its place.

Émile Souvestre collects the tale of Jean Rouge-Gorge, where the cow Mor-Vyoc'h (sea cow) changes into a horse and is named Marc'h-Mor (sea horse). Three mares, aspects of the waves (Ar Gazek Wenn (the white mare), Ar Gazek Klañv (the sick mare, which designates the stormy sea like the previous one) and Ar Gazek Ch'laz, regulate the tides and calm the swell according to the beliefs of Trégor at the end of the 19th century. "The blue horse" (Ar Marc'h Glas) is a common Breton nickname for the calm sea. A blue mare is said to lead the fish near Batz Island. Breton speakers also use kezeg-mor (sea horses, equivalent to Gaelic capall na mara) to refer to waves, or Ar marc'h hep kavalier (riderless horse) and Ar mar'c hep e vestr (horse without its master), for a succession of rolling waves. In the Bay of Saint-Brieuc, a local legend has it that a horse that sees the sea rushes in and disappears into the open sea, never to return.

The theme of water is sometimes mixed with fantasy. In Boqueho, legend has it that in the moonlight, horses come to drink from the stream near the Kergoff menhir, making a lot of noise, but without anyone being able to see them. In one tale, the horses turn into a fountain just as a magician's daughter flees with her lover. In Plouguenast, a "drowning horse" stretches out his back to take four or five children and throw them into a pond. There are also tales of drowned horses, notably in the legend of Saint Rou, who fell into a fountain in the forest of Rennes. The horse's neighs of distress can still be heard.

In the Barzaz Breiz, recounted by Théodore Hersart de la Villemarqué, the horse is both a symbol of warand a symbol of water, as witnessed by the bard Gwenc'hlan in his prophecy comparing the king to the sea horse (a creature quite similar to the unicorn, with silver horns):

Diougan Gwenc'hlan	The prophecy of Gwenc'hlan, English translation
Me wel ar morvarc'h énep tont, Ken a gren ann aot gand ar spont. Dalc'h mat ta, dalc'h mat ta, morvarc'h; Darc'b gand hé benn, darc'h mat ta, darc'h	I see the sea horse come to meet him And shake the shore with terror Hold tight! Hold on tight, sea horse Hit him on the head, hit him hard, hit him!"

=== Fairy tales ===
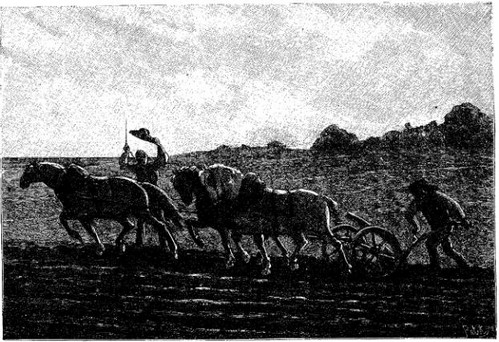
Illustration of the tale "La Houle du Châtelet" in Paul Sébillot's Contes de Terre et de Mer, 1883.

In fairy tales, the horse generally plays the role of a hero's magical protector. This is the case in Trégont-à-Baris, collected by Luzel. In Domestique chez le Diable, the horse is a guest in the realm of the dead. In Les Quatorze Juments, also entitled Le cheval du Monde, Riwall seeks to obtain the largest and most powerful horse in the world. The closely related L'Homme-cheval (collected by Paul-Yves Sébillot) and L'homme-poulain (Luzel) recount the trials and tribulations of a young man (changed into a horse by a fairy, and born with the head of a foal, respectively) seeking to marry.

The animal also features prominently in a number of other tales, such as Louizik. In Upper Brittany, Albert Poulain recounts the story of a marvellous horse who appears in the evening: "We put a coin in his ear, we rode him, and he went to the stream"; that of the little red horse; and that of the "horse who knelt". In La Gwrac'h de l'île du loch (Luzel's version) or La Groac'h de l'île du loch (Souvestre's version), the heroine Bellah Postic saves Houarn Pogann by crossing the sea on the back of a mystical horse that turns into a bird. Souvestre's tale involves a magic stick that becomes a "red bidet of Saint Trégonnec", and flies thanks to an incantation:

From Saint Vouga, remember!
Bidet de Léon, lead me
On the ground, in the air, on the water,
Wherever I need to go!

— Émile Souvestre, La Groac'h de l'île du Lok

=== Morvarc'h and King Marc'h ===
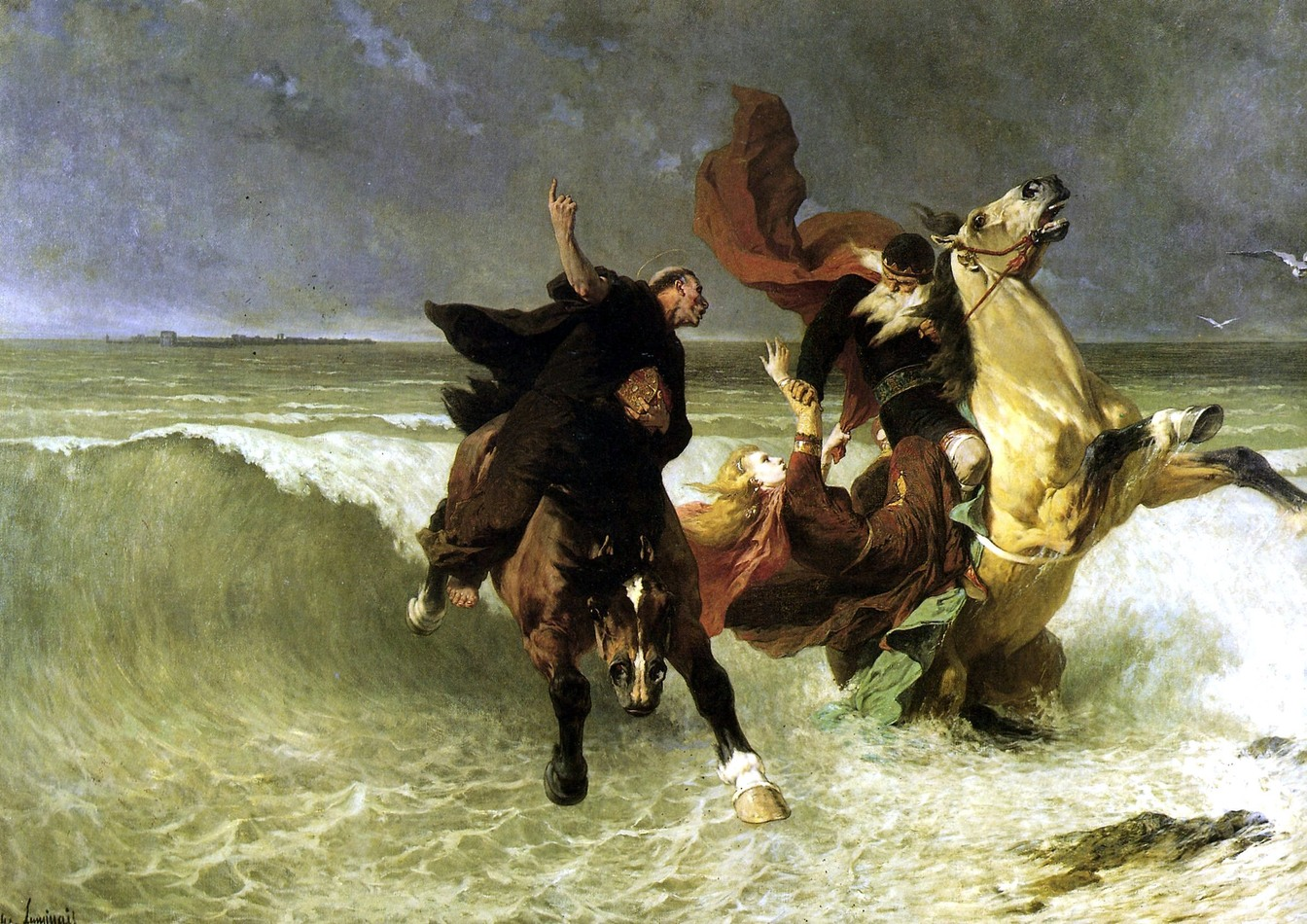
La fuite du roi Gradlon, by Évariste-Vital Luminais, circa 1884, Musée des Beaux-Arts de Quimper. The horse on the right is supposed to be Morvarc'h.

Morvarc'h is a fantastic horse capable of galloping across the waves. He is described as wearing a black coat, and Charles Guyot's book reports that he exhales flames from his nostrils when galloping. He appears in two tales written at the end of the 19th century and the beginning of the next: that of the town of Ys with King Gradlon, and an oral tale about King Marc'h of Cornouaille, collected by Yann ar Floc'h in the Aulne valley. According to Pierre-Jakez Hélias, Pouldreuzic's toponym comes from the foot of Morvarc'h, who is said to have washed ashore after the submergence of Ys.

King Marc'h is present in both medieval texts and recent oral traditions. He is a king of Armorique, whose unique feature is that he has horse ears. Marc'h kills his mount by mistake, aiming his bow at a white doe. The beast is protected by Dahud and the arrow turns back, killing Morvarc'h. In retaliation, the fairy-siren grows Morvarc'h's ears and mane on Marc'h's head. The king tries to hide this deformity. He calls in barbers to shave off his abundant mane, and then kills them, until one is left, who finally divulges the secret by digging a hole in the ground, where reed later grows and the first biniou is made. According to Bernard Sergent, the story of King Marc'h presents an important parallel with that of Eochaid in Ireland, another horse-eared king who makes all the barbers who shave him disappear, and finds himself at the origin of a musical instrument. The horse-eared king is certainly a common Celtic motif. According to Gaël Milin, the horse ears with which he is adorned in the Breton story featuring Morvarc'h are not a mark of shame, but proof of his sovereign legitimacy, a symbolism shared in all Celtic countries.

=== Mallet horse ===
Although this legend is mostly to be found in Poitou, there are attestations of the Mallet horse in historic Brittany, around the Lac de Grand-Lieu and throughout the Pays de Retz. This horse is said to ride at night. White, he looks ordinary when peasants and travelers come across him along the way. But he tempts them by offering to saddle up, or forces them to do so. When they're on his back, the Mallet horse sets off on a wild ride. The ride always ends with the death of the rider. The "Mallet horse game", a medieval festival with a horse-skirt, was organized in the parish of Saint-Lumine-de-Coutais. It was abolished in 1791.

== Vocabulary ==
Brittany's two regional languages, Breton and Gallo, include equestrian vocabulary. Due to the existence of numerous dialects within the Breton language itself in Lower Brittany, differences in vocabulary can be observed. For example, words used to command a horse, such as "forward", can be pronounced heih, hilh, hai, hue, hefu or dya. This is not without its problems, as the same word can have several different meanings in Lower Brittany. Diha or dia signifies "to the right" in Léon, while it means "to the left" in Trégor and the south of the Pays Vannetais, and "forward" in the Bay of Audierne. Voice-trained horses sometimes had difficulty adapting when sold in another region, such as French or Occitan. Some Breton surnames derive from the horse and its importance in Celtic society: Gwivarc'h ("warrior worthy of a good horse"), Gwionvarc'h and its variants (Guyonvarc'h, etc.), or Glevarc'heg ("valiant knight").

English name	Breton or Gallo name
Stallion	Marc'h
Uncastrated	Kalloc'h
Mare	Kazeg
Foal	Ebeul
Bay	Gell Yell
Chestnut	Rouan
Roan	Rouan (gl) Sklaer (br)
Strawberry roan	Pechar Pinchar
Buckskin	Rous
Chestnut with flaxen genes	Brun (gl) Dewet (br)

== Toponyms and coats of arms ==
Roll of arms of Crac'h, Morbihan.

Toponyms based on the words marc'h (Breton for "horse") and cabal (Latin for "horse") are numerous in south-western Finistère, corresponding to Cornouaille, particularly in Ménez Hom. The presence of the horse here is not only toponymic, but also manifest in art and traces of veneration of saints or equestrian divinities.

A number of toponyms between Douarnenez and the island of Ouessant are named after the mare. The Bigouden region bore the Latin name of Cap Caval. For Léon Fleuriot, these toponyms don't necessarily derive from the animal, as there is confusion with King Marc'h, whose stories and traditions come from the same geographical area. Thus, Plomarc'h (the port of Marc'h), Lostmarc'h ("horse island" according to Fleuriot, or "the horse's tail" according to Kervella) and Penmarch (literally "horse's head" in Breton, which can be understood as "King Marc'h's head" or "King Marc'h's promontory") owe their name to this horse-eared king, by assimilation between the first name Marc and the common name marc'h. Throughout Brittany, white stones bear the name gazek-vaen, "stone mares", the most famous of which is in Locronan. They were reputed to cure sterility.

Among the Breton nobility, the Gouvello family has adopted equestrian figures on its roll of arms: Argent, an iron of mule Gules between three spur rols of the same. Among the armorial bearings of the various communes, the horse and equestrian elements are especially present in Lower Brittany, corresponding to the department of Finistère: Brasparts (a horse's head Argent), Guissény, Plounéventer, Penmarc'h (a horse's head erased Gules, among other elements), Argol (King Gradlon on his mount), Plougonvelin (a sea-horse), Gouesnou (a white horse as support), or Saint-Renan (D'or au cheval gai de sable), Saint-Ségal (a horse Argent) and Tréméoc. In Morbihan, there's Crac'h (a golden horse's head), Merlevenez (Templiers on horseback) and Saint-Martin-sur-Oust (Saint Martin on horseback). In Ille-et-Vilaine, Plerguer (azure, a prancing horse argent), Lécousse (Saint Martin on horseback) and Saint-Georges-de-Reintembault (Saint Georges on horseback). In the Côtes-d'Armor region, the communes of Trémeur, and Hénanbihen (a mare and her foal, among other elements) feature the animal on their coats of arms. Of the Loire-Atlantique communes, none has a horse on its roll of arms.

== Arts ==
=== Illustrations, paintings and sculptures ===
Breton painter Olivier Perrin was the first to depict the traditional cavalcade that accompanied Breton weddings in the 19th century. His paintings provide a valuable insight into what preceded Breton weddings.

==== Gallo-Roman ====
The Gallo-Roman sculptural group known as "du cavalier à l'anguipède" (representing a Jupiterian cavalier god overcoming a snake-tailed giant) is very common in western Armorique, with three works recorded near Quimper and one in Plouaret. The theme is known throughout the Roman Empire. These sculptures were probably intended to protect rich agricultural estates, and bear witness to Roman influence.

A small Cornish building from the Roman period, featuring a bridled horse's head and the god Pan, hints at an important symbolism of fertility and fecundity for the animal, attested elsewhere in the Roman Empire and in Ireland. This symbolism has endured in the region, as today the Gazek Vaen (stone mare) is still associated with female fertility. The Musée des Beaux-Arts in Quimper preserves a male head with horse ears, certainly influenced by the legend of King Marc'h.

==== Christians ====
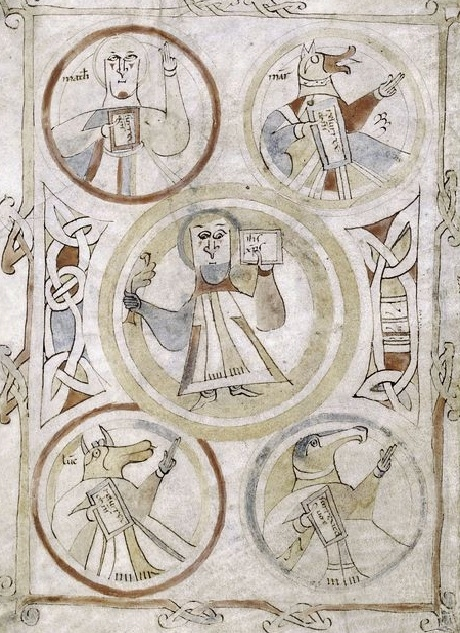
Representation of the four evangelists, including St. Mark with a horse's head (top right) – Landévennec Evangeliary, Bodleian Library.

The confusion between the first name Marc and the name of the horse in Breton (marc'h) may have prompted Breton monk illuminators to depict Mark the Evangelist with a horse's head (instead of the usual lion's head) in several miniatures from the Gospel of the Saint, produced at Landévennec Abbey. However, this theory is not universally accepted.

=== Numismatics ===
Celtic coins often feature horses, and the Venetes, Namnetes, Coriosolites and Riedones created coins with chariots, as well as naked riding goddesses. A Venetes coin from the late 1st century B.C. features a charioteer on a chariot, pulled by an anthropomorphic horse with a human head, flying over a winged monster. It could be a kind of logo, originating in an important memorial date for the Venetians, probably that of an equinox, and linked to the sculptural group of the rider with the anguiped. The figure of the horse with a human head is unique in Armorica, suggesting a possible error by the engraver.

=== Literature and cinema ===
In 1975, Pierre-Jakez Hélias published The Horse of Pride, a largely autobiographical book. It describes the life of a poor family of Bigouden farmers in Pouldreuzic, shortly after the First World War. Pierre-Alain meets Anne-Marie; he works as a farm hand, looking after the horses. Pierre-Jacques, known as "Petit Pierre", is raised by his grandfather Alain, who teaches him that "it's pride you ride when you don't have a horse". The book was a great success, and led to a controversy with Xavier Grall, who accused Hélias of presenting a backward-looking image of Brittany. Grall replied in Le Cheval couché. The book was made into a film in 1980, by director Claude Chabrol.

André Le Ruyet's Morvarc'h, cheval de mer, published in 1999, recounts the discovery of Celtic legends by Philippe, a Parisian. He meets a shepherd near the roc'h Trezenel and embarks on a journey of initiation in the company of the sea horse Morvarc'h.

== See also ==
- Horses in Brittany
