= Pardon (ceremony) =

Breton form of pilgrimage

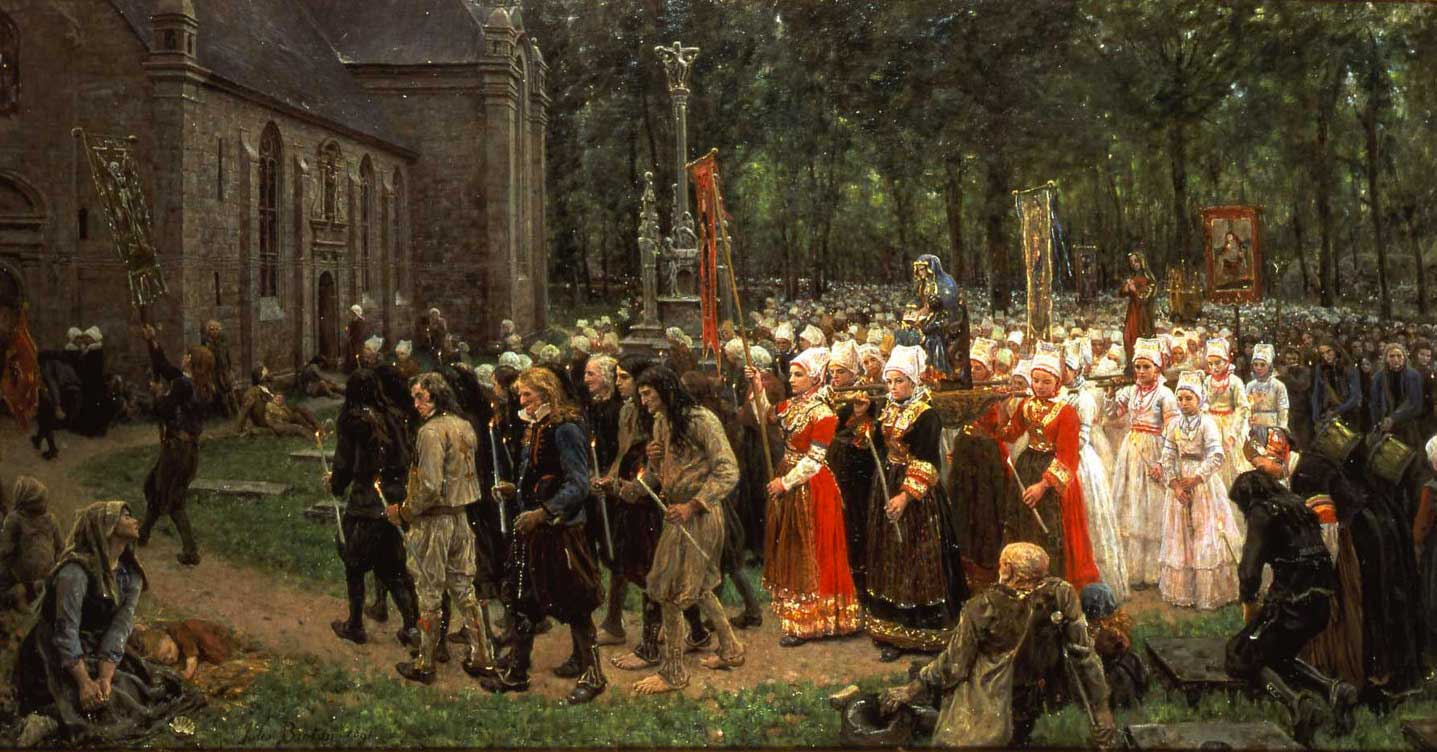
The Pardon at Kergoat (1891) by Jules Breton

A pardon (Breton: pardoniñ) is a typically Breton form of pilgrimage and one of the most traditional demonstrations of popular Catholicism in Brittany. Of very ancient origin, probably dating back to the conversion of the country by the Celtic monks, it is comparable to the pattern days of pre-famine Ireland.

A pardon is a penitential ceremony. A pardon occurs on the feast of the patron saint of a church or chapel, at which an indulgence is granted, hence the use of the word "pardon". Pardons only occur in the traditionally Breton language speaking Western part of Brittany. They do not extend further east than Guingamp.

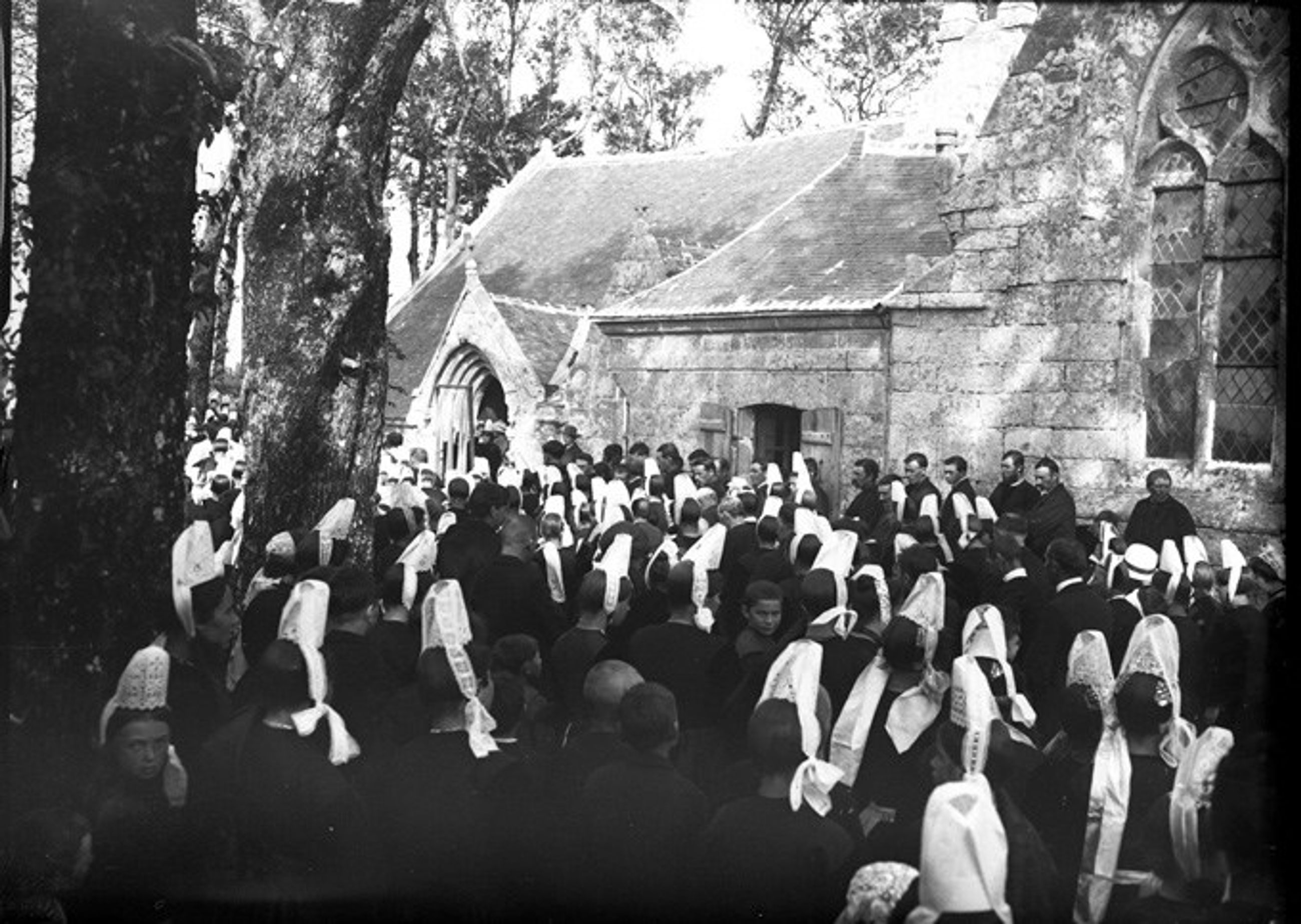
Pardon at the Notre-Dame de Tréminou chapel in Plomeur in 1920 captured by Jacques de Thézac

== Types ==
The faithful go on a pilgrimage either to the tomb of a saint or a place dedicated to a saint. The locations may be associated with miraculous appearances, as in Querrien, or holy relics.

The pardons begin in March and end in October, but the majority of them are between Easter and Michaelmas. Pilgrims traditionally wore their best costumes, each diocese and parish having a distinctive style, and otherwise only worn at weddings. However, traditional Breton costume is now not typically worn, except at the Locronan pardon, in honour of Saint Ronan. Penitents travel as a group in parishes, fraternities or other corporate bodies, bringing banners, crosses and various insignia in procession. Each group competes with the others for grandeur. The leader of the pardon, typically a high ranking ecclesiastic, has the title of "pardonnor". If relics are involved, he will normally carry them during part of the procession. For most of the pilgrimage, however, this honour falls to those who were considered to be worthiest of it by the various social groups represented.

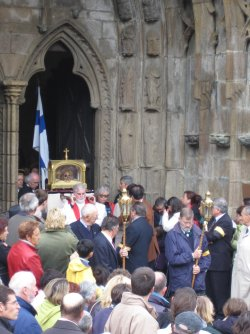
The Pardon of Saint Yves in Tréguier, 2005

The greater part of the day is spent in prayer, and the pardon begins with an early Mass at 4 AM. Its observance, however, has actually commenced earlier, for the preceding evening is devoted to confession, and the rosary is generally recited by the pilgrims the whole way to the place of the pardon. After the religious service, a great procession takes place around the church. This is the most picturesque part of the pardon and may be regarded as its mise en scène. At Ste-Anne d'Auray, this procession is especially striking. In the procession join all those who believe that the intercession of St. Anne has saved them in times of peril. Sailors will carry fragments of a vessel, upon which they escaped in a shipwreck; the once lame will carry on their shoulders crutches which they no longer need; and those rescued from fire will carry the rope or ladder by which they escaped from the flames.

The religious observances are usually followed by social events including picnics and, traditionally, wrestling matches.

== Significance ==
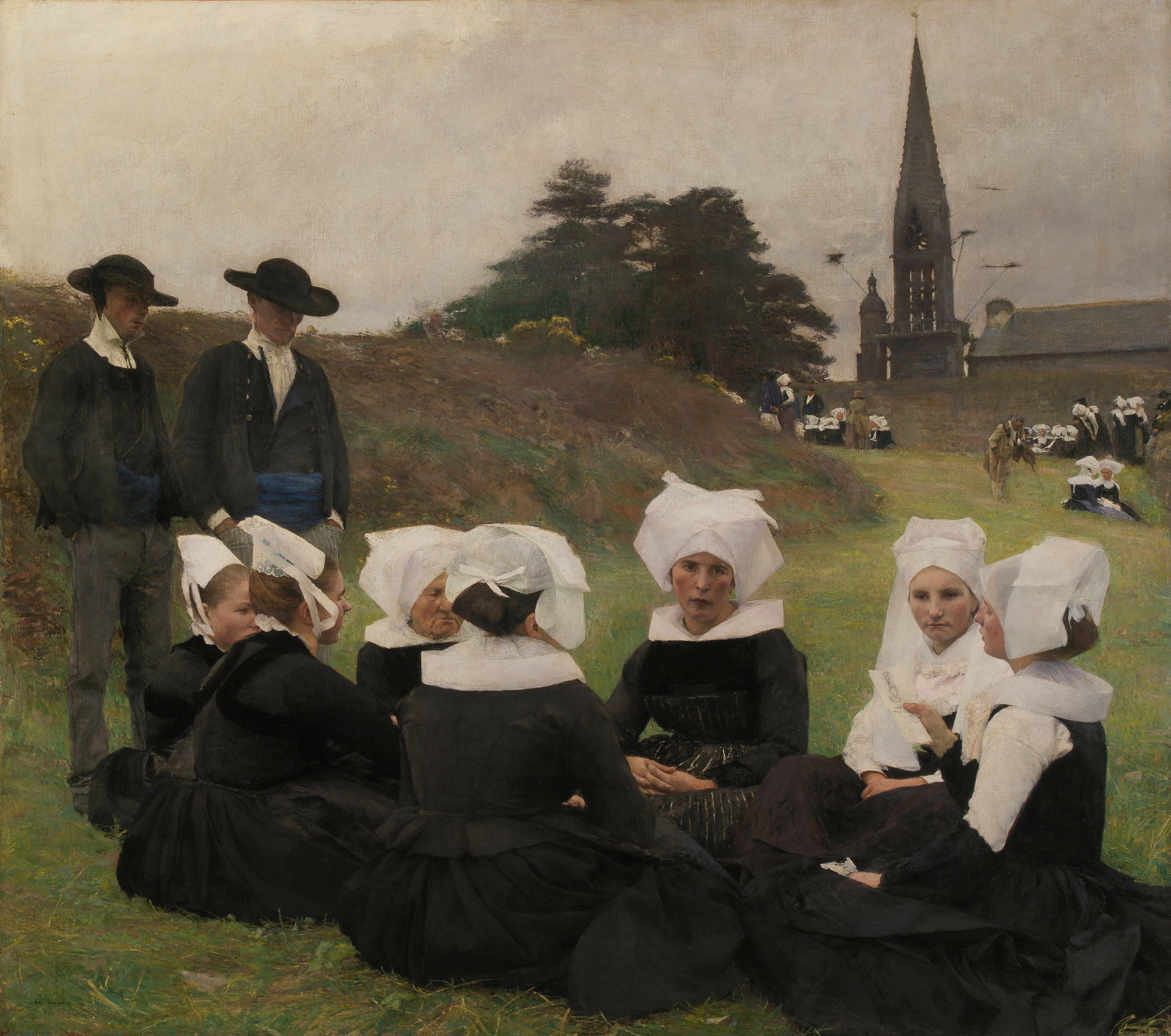
Breton Women at a Pardon, 1887, by Pascal Dagnan-Bouveret

The dispersal of the pilgrims until meeting at the appointed place, like the procession, symbolises the desire to obtain intercession from the celebrated saint by offering the effort of the journey as an act of faith. This reflects the Christian view that the human condition on Earth is a journey towards the Kingdom of heaven or the new Promised Land. Following this logic, the pilgrims are invited to confess their sins to their priests before taking part in the mass, which often precedes solemn vespers. Once they are granted absolution, the groups engage in communal festivities to express the joy of Christian redemption. This can take the form of a village fair or even resemble a funfair.

== Principal pardons ==
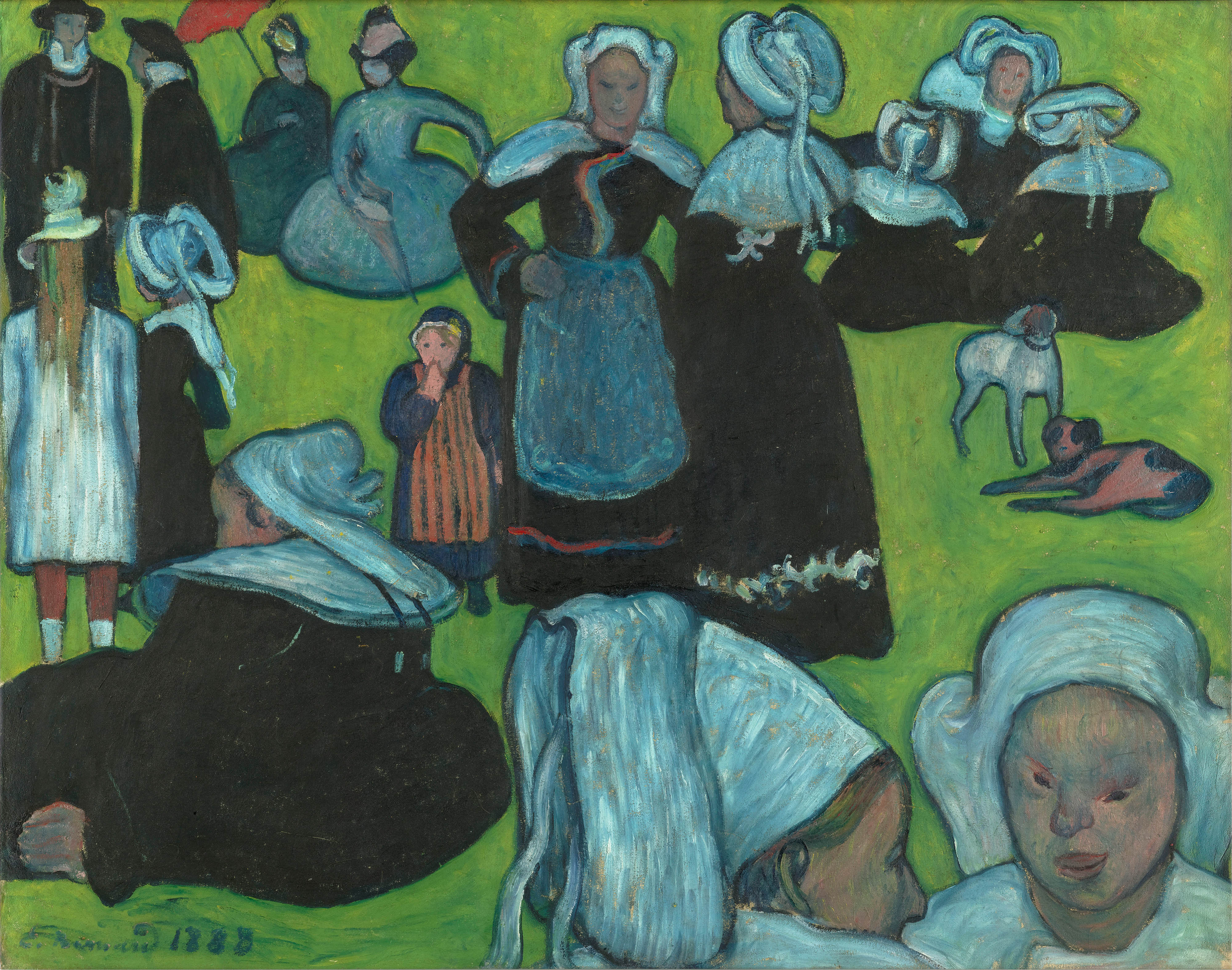
The Pardon, 1888, by Émile Bernard

There are five major pardons: Saint Yves at Tréguier, known as the pardon of the poor; Our Lady of Rumengol, known as the pardon of the singers; Saint-Jean-du-Doigt, near Morlaix, called the pardon of fire; Saint Ronan, or the pardon of the mountain; and Sainte Anne de la Palud, or the pardon of the sea. Very large pilgrimages are made to some pardons, including those of St. Jean-du-Doigt and Sainte-Anne-d'Auray in Morbihan. The Locronan pardon of Saint Ronan involves a troménie (a 12 km-long procession). The former occurs on 24 June, and that of Ste Anne d'Auray on 24 July, the anniversary of the finding of the miraculous statue of Saint Anne by the peasant Yves Nicolazic. The latter is regarded as the most famous pilgrimage in all Brittany, and attracts pilgrims from Tréguier, Léonnais, Cornouaille, and especially from Morbihan.

Some pardons are held during notable religious festivals, like the Feast of the Assumption on August 15. The pardons dedicated to the Virgin Mary are usually followed by those dedicated to Mary's mother Saint Anne, patron saint of Brittany. However, the majority honour local saints because of their patronage role to protect specific categories of people or activities. Thus there are pardons dedicated to Saint Gildas at the beginning of June in Trégor, to Saint Guirec, patron of girls about to marry, and to the patron saints of individual parishes.

The pardon of Saint Yves in Tréguier honours, though him, the legal profession, of which he is patron. Its influence is now international, since thousands of pilgrims, official or anonymous, from all the countries of the world, meet at his tomb in the parish of his birthplace, in fraternities of lawyers, judges and other legal professionals.

== Pardons in art ==
Pardons were a popular subject in 19th century French art, since the local people dressed in their elaborate traditional Breton costume for the ceremonies, and were also involved in open-air public festivities. Many artists came to Brittany to portray pardons. Jules Breton and Pascal Dagnan-Bouveret painted a number of such scenes.

Paintings by members of the Pont-Aven School such as Paul Sérusier and Paul Gauguin's 1888 Vision after the Sermon are also inspired by this aspect of Breton culture.

== See also ==
- Blessed Julian Maunoir, "Apostle of Brittany"
- Horses in Breton culture

== Literature ==
- Anatole Le Braz, Au pays des pardons
