= Yves Nicolazic =

Breton visionary (1591–1645)

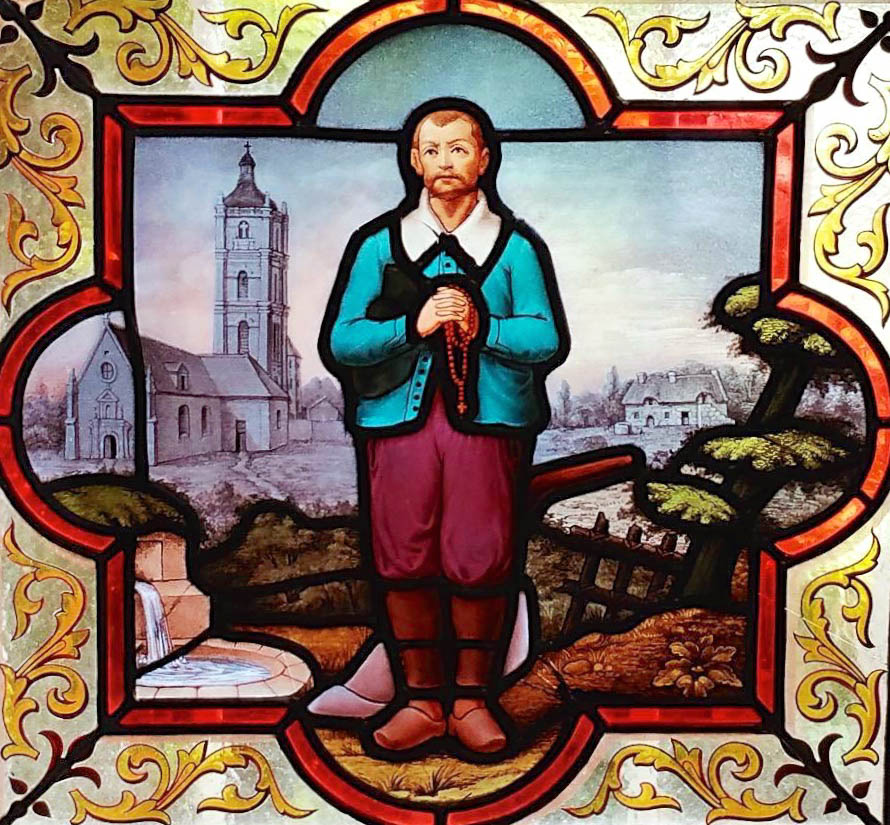
Yvon Nicolazic

Yves Nicolazic (3 April 1591 – 13 May 1645) was a Breton peasant who claimed he saw Saint Anne, the mother of the Virgin Mary, having unearthed a previously forgotten statue of Saint Anne in his field. This became the site of the great pilgrimage center of Keranna (Sainte-Anne-d'Auray). He is responsible for the building of the Basilica of Saint Anne.

Its history and that of the appearances are well known and well authenticated, especially with the "declaration which he himself made before Sir Jacques Bullion on 12 March 1625" in the presbytery of Pluneret.

== Biography ==
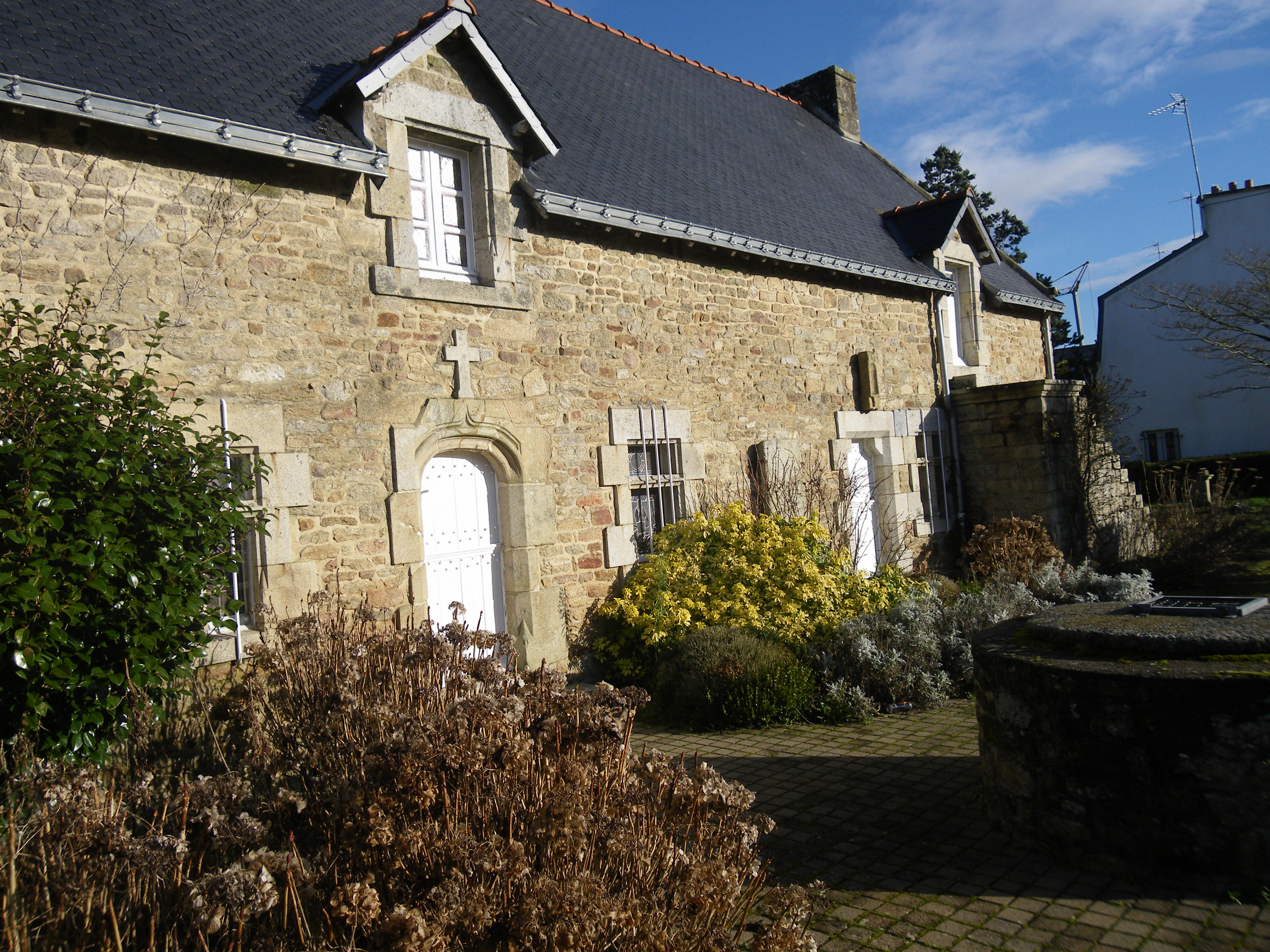
La maison de Yves Nicolazic a Sainte Anne d'Auray

Yves Nicolazic was born in Pluneret, in the diocese of Gwened (French: Vannes), on 3 April 1591. Nicolazic was a peasant who only spoke Breton and knew neither how to read nor write. He was however a capable farmer and well regarded. But he was also a man of simple and deep spiritual life, known to be always praying, helping others, and being charitable. The historians Buléon and Le Garrec, call him a secular saint.

Nicolazic and his wife, Guillemette Le Roux, – they didn't have any children yet – lived in the village of Ker Anna, "Anne’s village" in the Breton language, and their field of the Bocenno was, according to an ancient tradition, the site which once contained a chapel dedicated to Saint Anne. It was difficult to work this field where cattle would not enter with the cart. The father of Nicolazic, fifteen years earlier, had removed some cut granite stones to build a barn.

At the beginning of August 1623, at the end of the evening of a day's work, and while he thought especially of Saint Anne "his good Patron Saint", a very bright light burned in the House of Nicolazic and a hand appeared holding a torch of wax. On several occasions, Nicolazic, subsequently, saw this vision lighting the roads nearby.

One night with his brother-in-law, they saw a White Lady with a candle in her hand at the field of the Bocenno. All these events took place peacefully and slowly, and Nicolazic only increased his prayers.

On 25 July 1624, the eve of Saint Anne's feast, the ‘Lady’ again appeared at night on the road, told him words to reassure him and led him home with a torch in her hand.

Then in clarity, the mysterious Lady spoke: "Yves Nicolazic, don't be afraid. I'm Anne, mother of Mary. Tell your priest that in the piece of land called the Bocenno, there was once a chapel in my name. I want it to be rebuilt as soon as possible and that you take care of it because God desires that I be honoured there".

But it would take another year before the first mass for St. Anne would be said in the Bocenno field. The priests at the time were no hastier than today to believe in any alleged apparitions.

When on the night of 7 to 8 March 1625, Saint Anne appeared once again, she recommended that Yves take his neighbours with him and follow the ‘torch’. He found an ancient statue of Saint Anne. It was an old wooden statue, much eroded, with however still traces of white and azure.

Three days later, the pilgrims began to arrive in droves to pray before the statue. These multitudes have not stopped even up to these times. Despite the reservations of the Parish Priest, the first official mass was celebrated by decision of the Bishop of Gwened (Vannes), on 26 July 1625.

From that day on, Yves Nicolazic became ‘the Builder’. He directed the work and lent his strength to the construction of the Basilica.

He died on Sainte-Anne-d'Auray 13 May 1645.

== Legacy ==
The place took the name of Sainte-Anne-d'Auray and the 'pardon' which is taking place every year is the largest in Brittany. On 20 September 1996, John Paul II came there to pray in this Breton sanctuary, and with him there were 150,000 pilgrims.

A preliminary local investigation for Nicolazic's beatification was opened on 27 November 1937. He was later declared a Servant of God.

== Sources ==
- Jean-Loup Avril, 500 bretons à connaître, Saint-Malo (France), L'ancre de marine,1989
- Job an Irien and Y.P. Castel, Sainte Anne et les Bretons – Santez Anna, Mamm goz ar Vretonned, éditions Minihi Levenez, Bilingual Work in Breton and French, 1996, (OCLC 865315790).

== Related articles. ==
- Saint Anne
- Sainte-Anne-d'Auray
