= Sainte-Anne-d'Auray =

Sainte-Anne-d'Auray Santez-Anna-Wened
- Commune
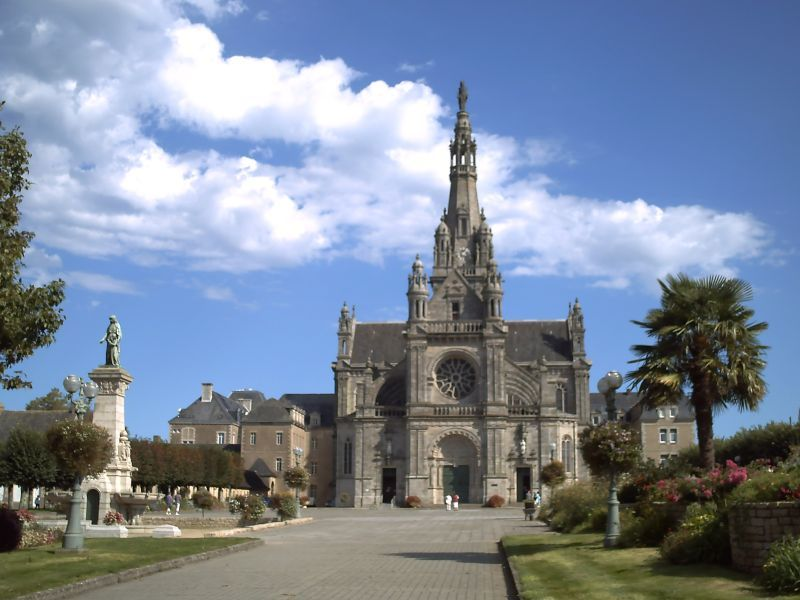
- Basilique Sainte-Anne d'Auray

- Coat of arms
- Location of Sainte-Anne-d'Auray
- Location within France Location within Brittany
- Coordinates: 47°42′15″N 2°57′10″W
- Country: France
- Region: Brittany
- Department: Morbihan
- Arrondissement: Lorient
- Canton: Auray
- Intercommunality: Auray Quiberon Terre Atlantique

Government
  - Mayor (2026–32): Kevin Forget
- Area^{1}: 4.97 km^{2} (1.92 sq mi)
- Highest elevation: 57 m (187 ft)
- Lowest elevation: 36 m (118 ft)
- Population (2023): 2,889
  - Density: 581/km^{2} (1,510/sq mi)
- Time zone: UTC+01:00 (CET)
  - Summer (DST): UTC+02:00 (CEST)
- INSEE/Postal code: 56263 /56400
- ^{1} French Land Register data, which excludes lakes, ponds, glaciers > 1 km^{2} (0.386 sq mi or 247 acres) and river estuaries.

Sainte-Anne-d'Auray (French pronunciation: [sɛ̃.t‿an doʁɛ]; Breton: Santez-Anna-Wened) is a commune in the Morbihan department of Brittany in north-western France. It is the third most popular pilgrimage site in France, after Lourdes and Lisieux.

== History ==
Sainte-Anne-d'Auray is a village in the Diocese of Vannes (Morbihan), in Brittany, famous for its sanctuary and for its pilgrimages, or "pardons", in honour of Saint Anne, to whom the Breton people, in very early times, on becoming Christian, had dedicated a chapel. This first chapel was destroyed about the end of the seventh century, but the memory of it was kept alive by tradition, and the hamlet was called "Keranna", i.e. "Village of Anne".

More than nine centuries later, at the beginning of the seventeenth century (1624–25), St. Anne is said to have appeared several times to a simple and pious village farmer, and commanded him to rebuild the ancient chapel. The apparitions became so frequent, and before so many witnesses, that Sebastien de Rosmadec, Bishop of Vannes, deemed it his duty to inquire into the matter. Yves Nicolazic, to whom St. Anne had appeared, and numerous witnesses, testified to the truth of events which had become famous throughout Brittany, and around 1630 the Bishop gave permission for the building of a chapel. Anne of Austria and Louis XIII enriched the sanctuary with many gifts, among them a relic of St. Anne brought from Jerusalem in the thirteenth century, and in 1641 the Queen obtained from the Pope the erection of a confraternity, which Pius IX raised to the rank of an archconfraternity in 1872. In the meanwhile pilgrimages had begun and became more numerous year by year, nor did the Revolution put a stop to them. The chapel, indeed was plundered, the Carmelites who served it driven out, and the miraculous statue of St. Anne was burned at Vannes in 1793; yet the faithful still flocked to the chapel, which was covered with ex-votos.

In 1810 the convent of the Carmelites was turned into a minor seminary. In 1866, the Cardinal Saint Marc laid and blessed the first stone of the present basilica. A new statue of Saint Anne was solemnly consecrated by order of Pius IX, 30 September 1868. St. Anne has continued to be the favourite pilgrimage of Brittany down to the present day. Pope John Paul II visited here in 1996. Every summer, there is the Grand Pardon of Sainte Anne, the largest pilgrimage in the region on 26 July, the feast of St. Anne. The religious services are followed by picnics, dancing and entertainment.

To mark the shared heritage between Bretons and the Cornish, Sainte-Anne-d'Auray is twinned with Camborne in Cornwall.

== Basilica status ==
The most notable feature of the village is the large Basilica of Sainte-Anne d'Auray, which is a major site of pilgrimage. Saint Anne is the patron saint of Brittany. The Basilica was built in Neo-Gothic style from 1865 to 1872 to replace an earlier church which had housed the ancient statue of Anne said to have been miraculously discovered by Yves Nicolazic.

Pope Pius IX granted a Pontifical decree to the Bishop of Vannes, Jean Marie Becel to crown the venerated Marian image on 22 May 1868. The ceremony was executed on 30 September 1868. The decree was republished again by Cardinal Costantino Patrizi Naro and notarized by the Secretary of the Sacred Congregation of Rites, Monsigneur Placidus Ralli on 23 March 1876.

== Nicolazic's house ==
Not far from the Basilica is the house where Yves Nicolazic and his family lived. The house was severely damaged in a fire in 1902, but restored five years later. A statue of St. Anne stands on the site of the barn, where the apparitions are said to have taken place.

== Population ==
Historical population
Year	Pop.	±% p.a.
1968	1,405	—
1975	1,395	−0.10%
1982	1,512	+1.16%
1990	1,630	+0.94%
1999	1,844	+1.38%
2007	2,175	+2.09%
2012	2,576	+3.44%
2017	2,708	+1.00%
2023	2,889	+1.08%
Source: INSEE

Inhabitants of Sainte-Anne-d'Auray are called in French Saintannois.

== Breton language ==
In 2008, 10,82% of all children in the area attended bilingual schools in primary school education.

== Gallery ==
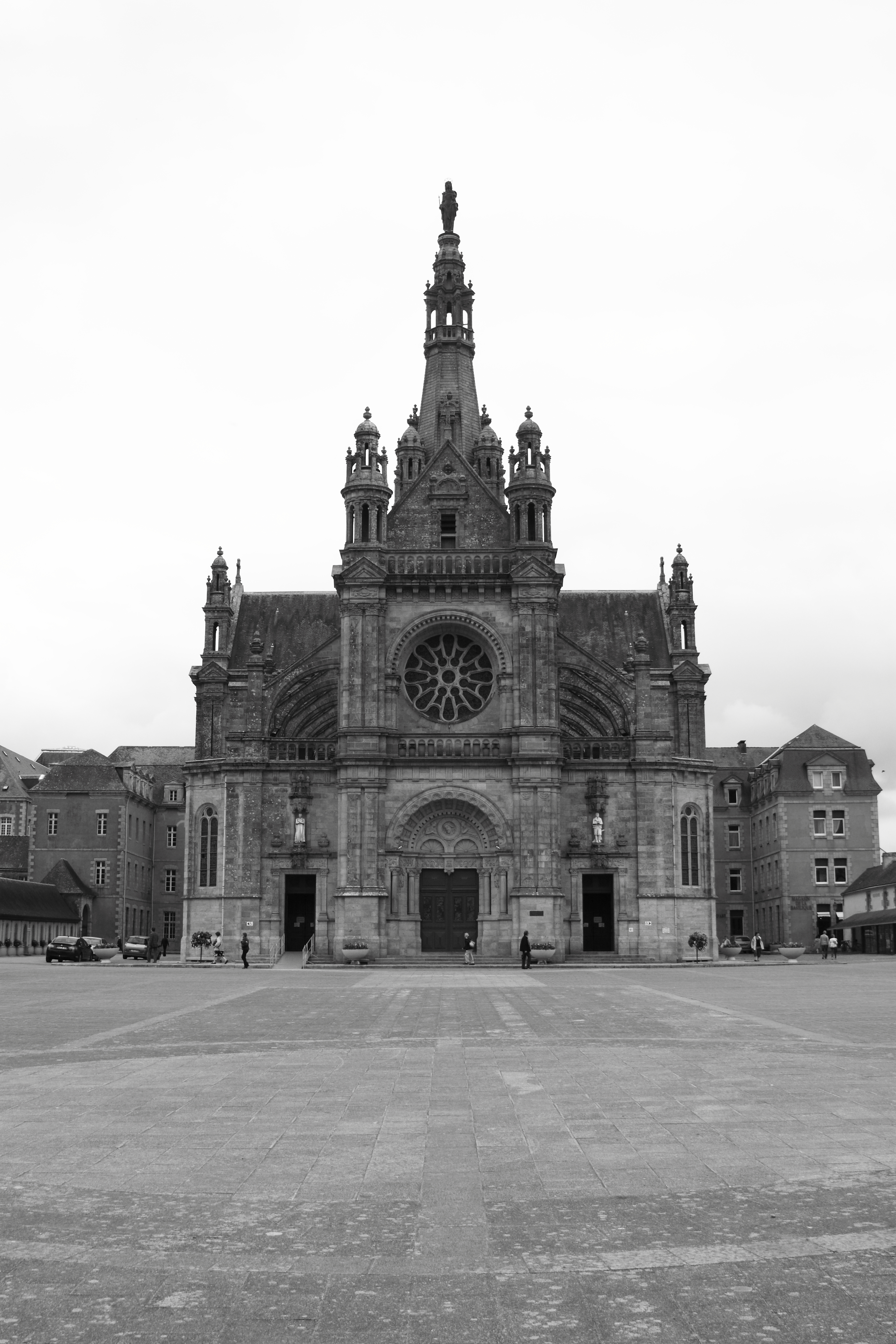
Basilica

Memorial to Breton victims of World War I

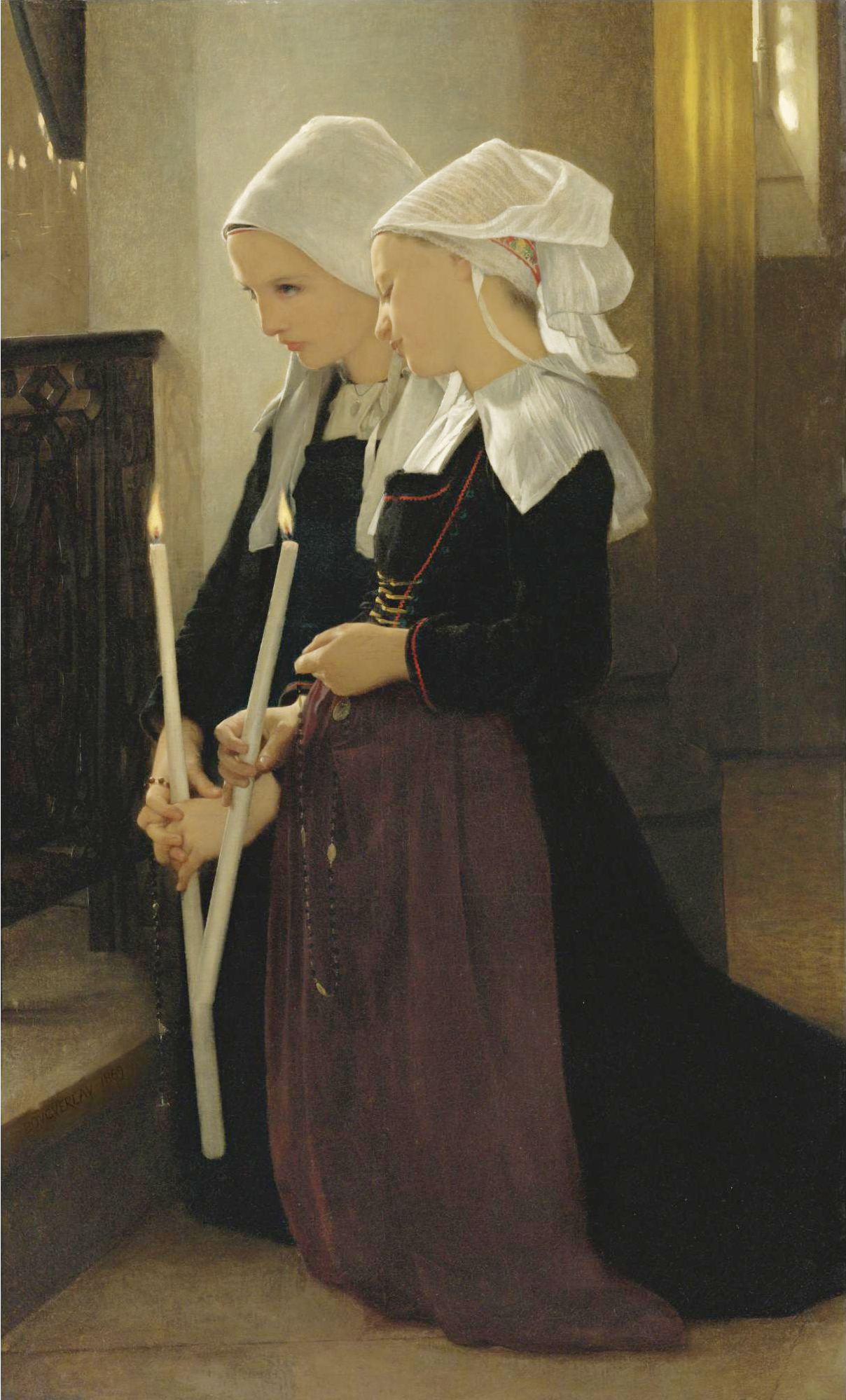
Le voeu à Sainte-Anne-d'Auray by William-Adolphe Bouguereau

== See also ==
- Communes of the Morbihan department
- Sainte-Anne-de-Beaupré -in Canada
