= Arzano (disambiguation) =

Arzano is an Italian municipality in the Metropolitan City of Naples.

Arzano may also refer to:

- Arzano, Finistère, a French commune in the Finistère department
- Aržano, a Croatian village
