= Muriel Jourda =

French politician (born 1967)

Senator for Morbihan
- Incumbent
- Assumed office 2 October 2017

Mayor of Port-Louis
- In office 22 March 2008 – 4 April 2014
- Preceded by: Monique Vergnaud
- Succeeded by: Daniel Martin

Personal details
- Born: 27 October 1967 (age 58)
- Party: The Republicans (2015–present)
- Other political affiliations: Union for a Popular Movement (2002–2015); New Energy
- Occupation: Lawyer

Muriel Jourda (French pronunciation: [myʁjɛl ʒuʁda]; born 27 October 1967) is a French lawyer and politician of The Republicans (LR) who has served as a Senator for Morbihan since 2017. From 2008 to 2014, she held the mayorship of Port-Louis, of which she was a municipal councillor from 2001 to 2017. She has also been a departmental councillor of Morbihan for the canton of Hennebont since 2015.
