= Locmiquélic =

Commune in Brittany, France

Locmiquélic Lokmikaelig
- Commune
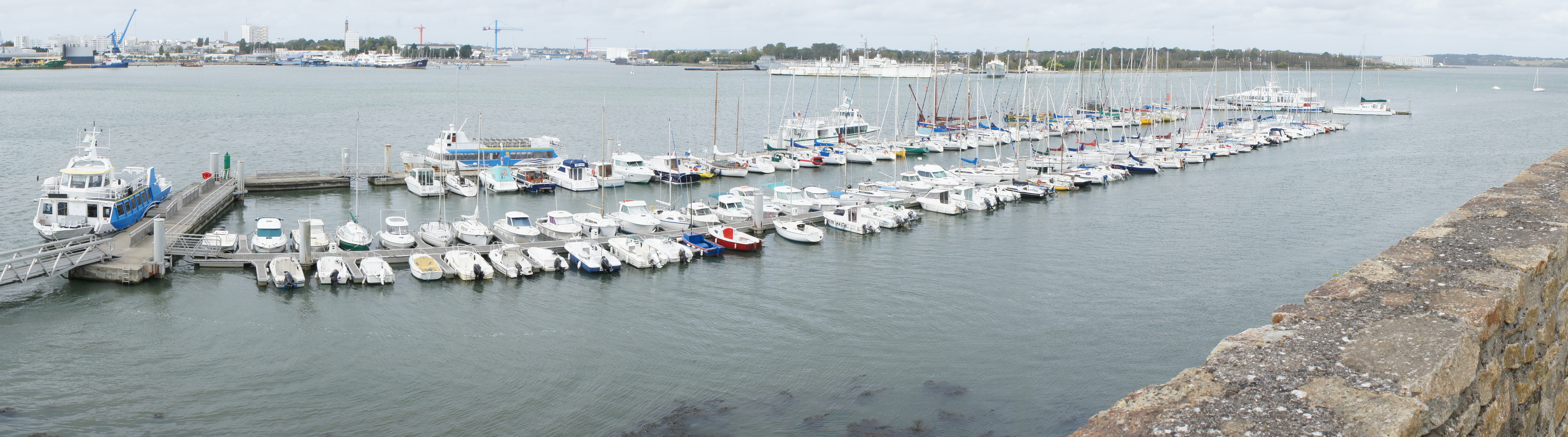
- The port of Pen Mané, in Locmiquélic

- Coat of arms
- Location of Locmiquélic
- Location within France Location within Brittany
- Coordinates: 47°43′34″N 3°20′22″W
- Country: France
- Region: Brittany
- Department: Morbihan
- Arrondissement: Lorient
- Canton: Hennebont
- Intercommunality: Lorient Agglomération

Government
  - Mayor (2026–32): Éric Paturel
- Area^{1}: 3.58 km^{2} (1.38 sq mi)
- Highest elevation: 24 m (79 ft)
- Lowest elevation: 0 m (0 ft)
- Population (2023): 4,093
  - Density: 1,140/km^{2} (2,960/sq mi)
- Time zone: UTC+01:00 (CET)
  - Summer (DST): UTC+02:00 (CEST)
- INSEE/Postal code: 56118 /56570
- ^{1} French Land Register data, which excludes lakes, ponds, glaciers > 1 km^{2} (0.386 sq mi or 247 acres) and river estuaries.

Locmiquélic (French pronunciation: [lɔkmikelik]; Breton: Lokmikaelig) is a commune in the Morbihan department of Brittany in north-western France.

== Toponymy ==
From the Breton loc which means hermitage (cf.: Locminé) and miquélic which means Little Michael.

== Population ==
Historical population
Year	Pop.	±% p.a.
1968	4,542	—
1975	4,284	−0.83%
1982	4,002	−0.97%
1990	4,094	+0.28%
1999	3,945	−0.41%
2007	4,151	+0.64%
2012	4,164	+0.06%
2017	4,046	−0.57%
2023	4,093	+0.19%
Source: INSEE

Inhabitants of Locmiquélic are called in French Locmiquélicains or Minahouëts.

== See also ==
- Communes of the Morbihan department
