= Languidic =

Commune in Brittany, France

Languidic Langedig
- Commune
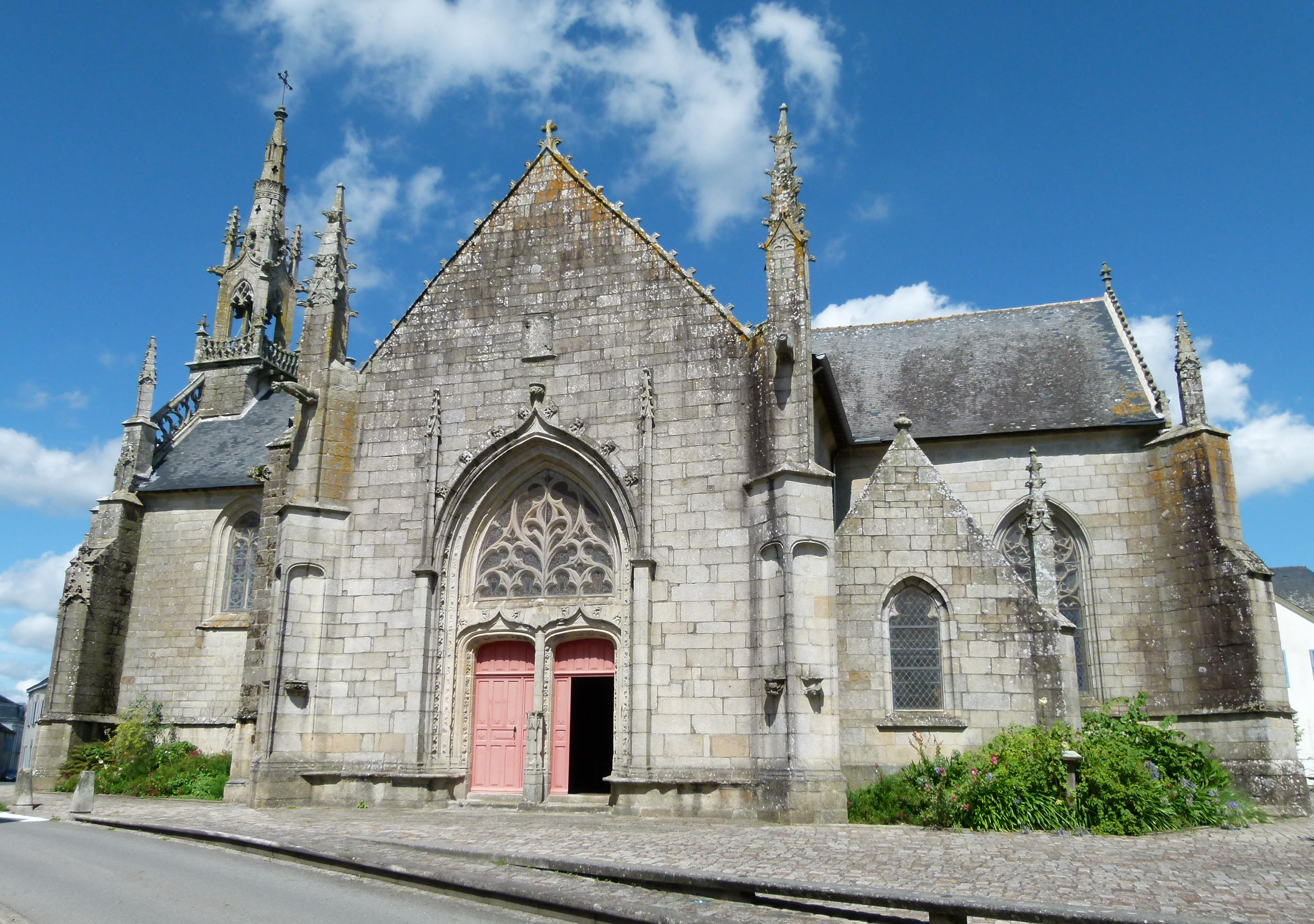
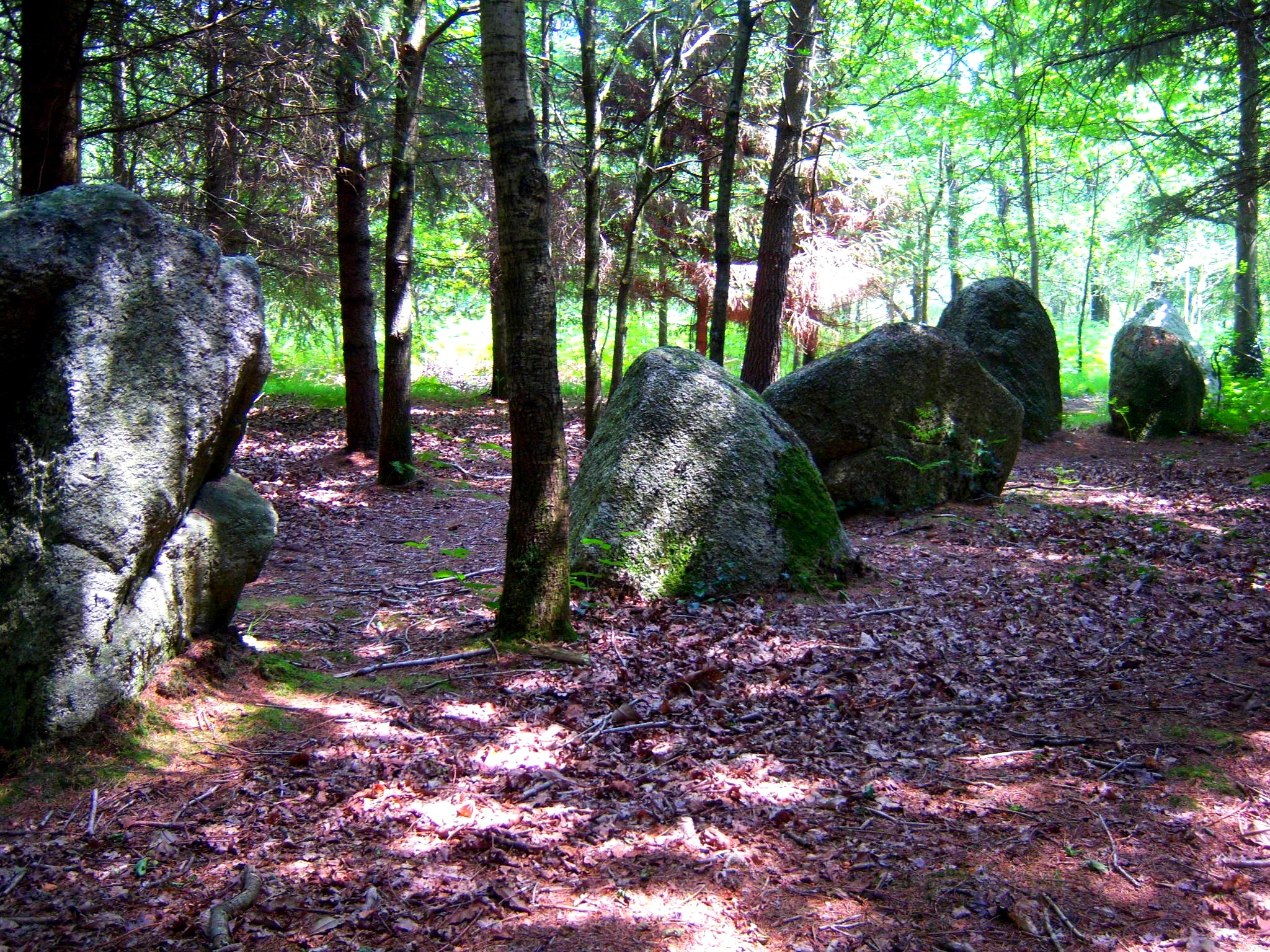
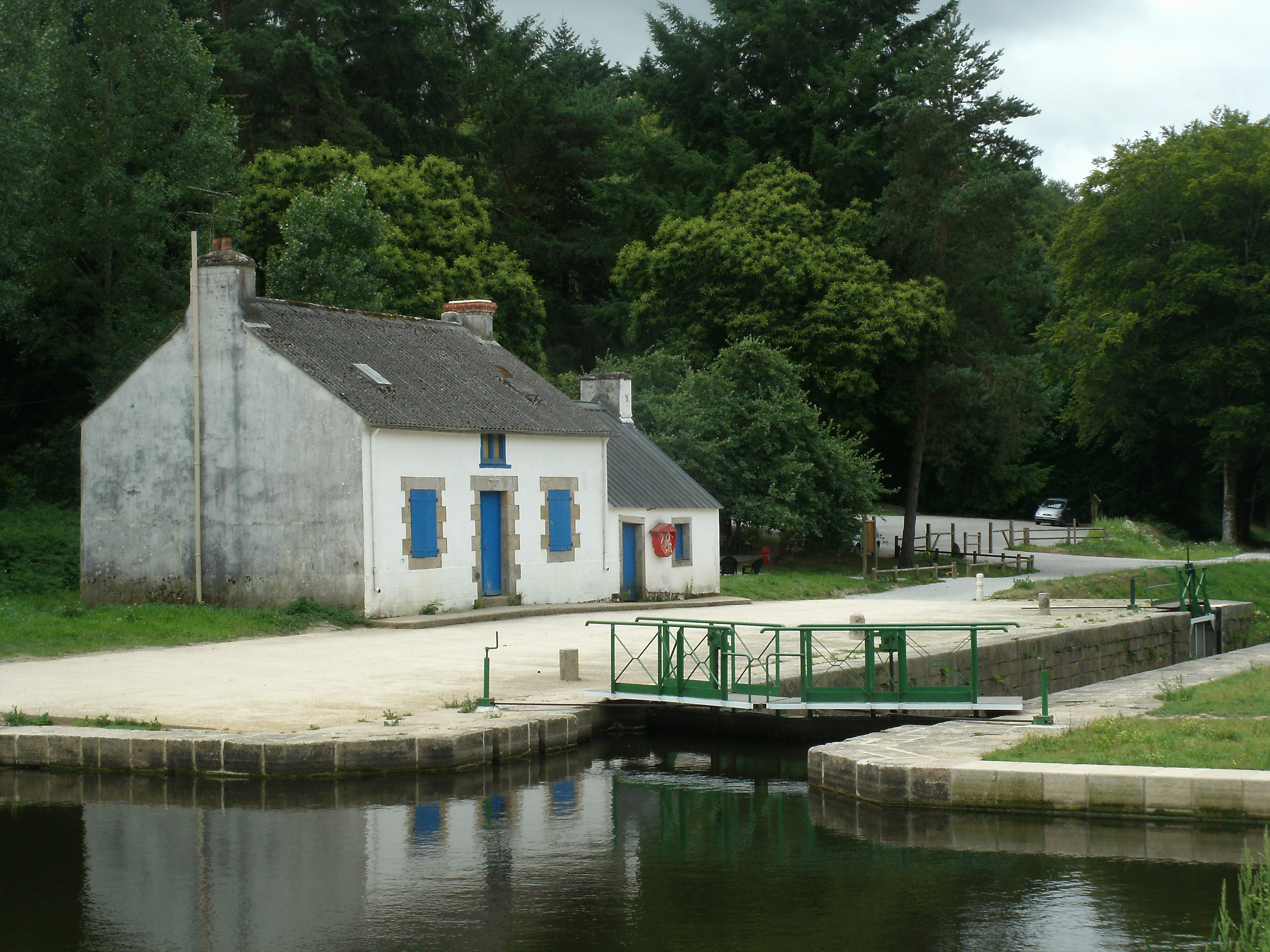
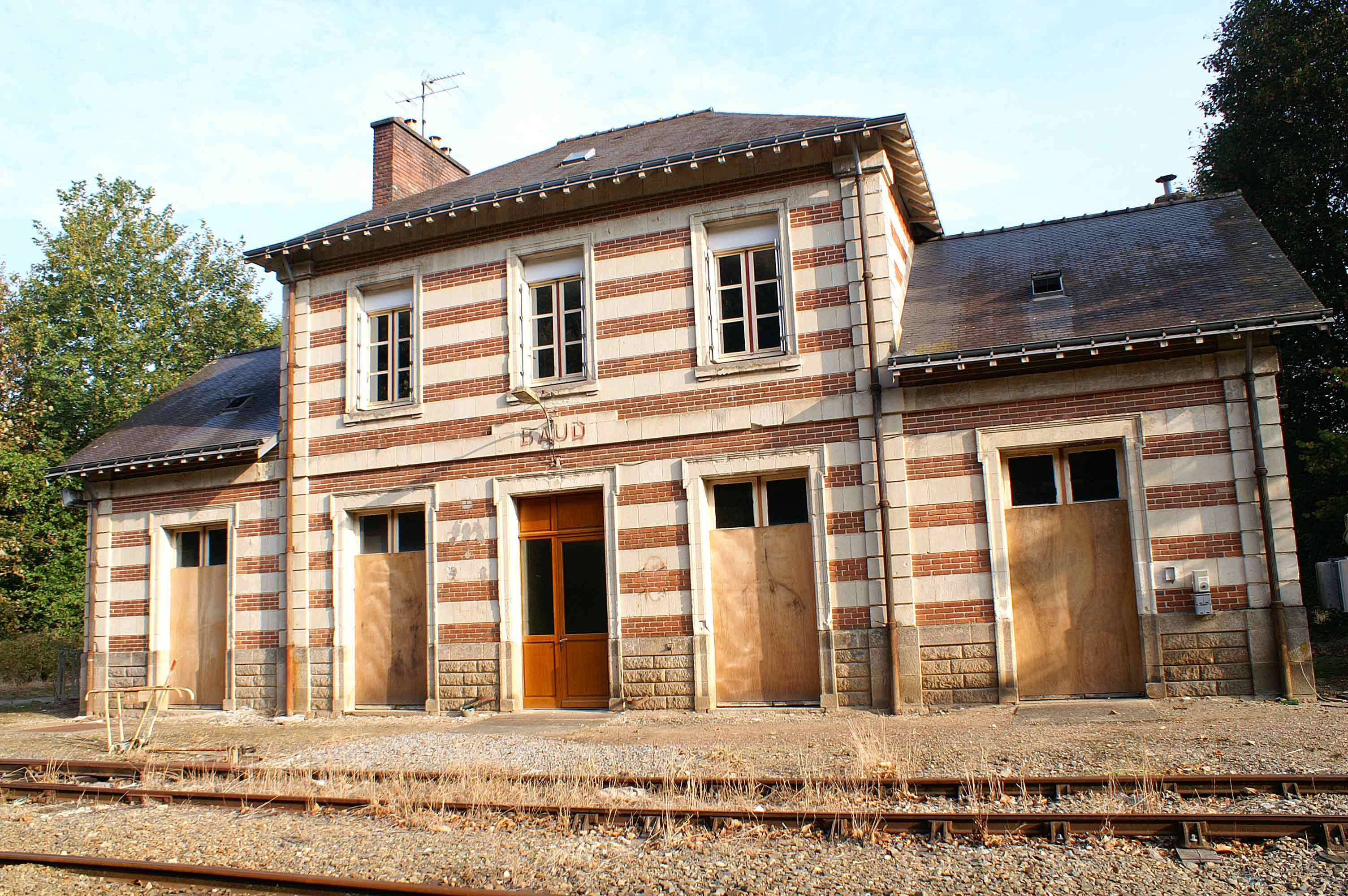
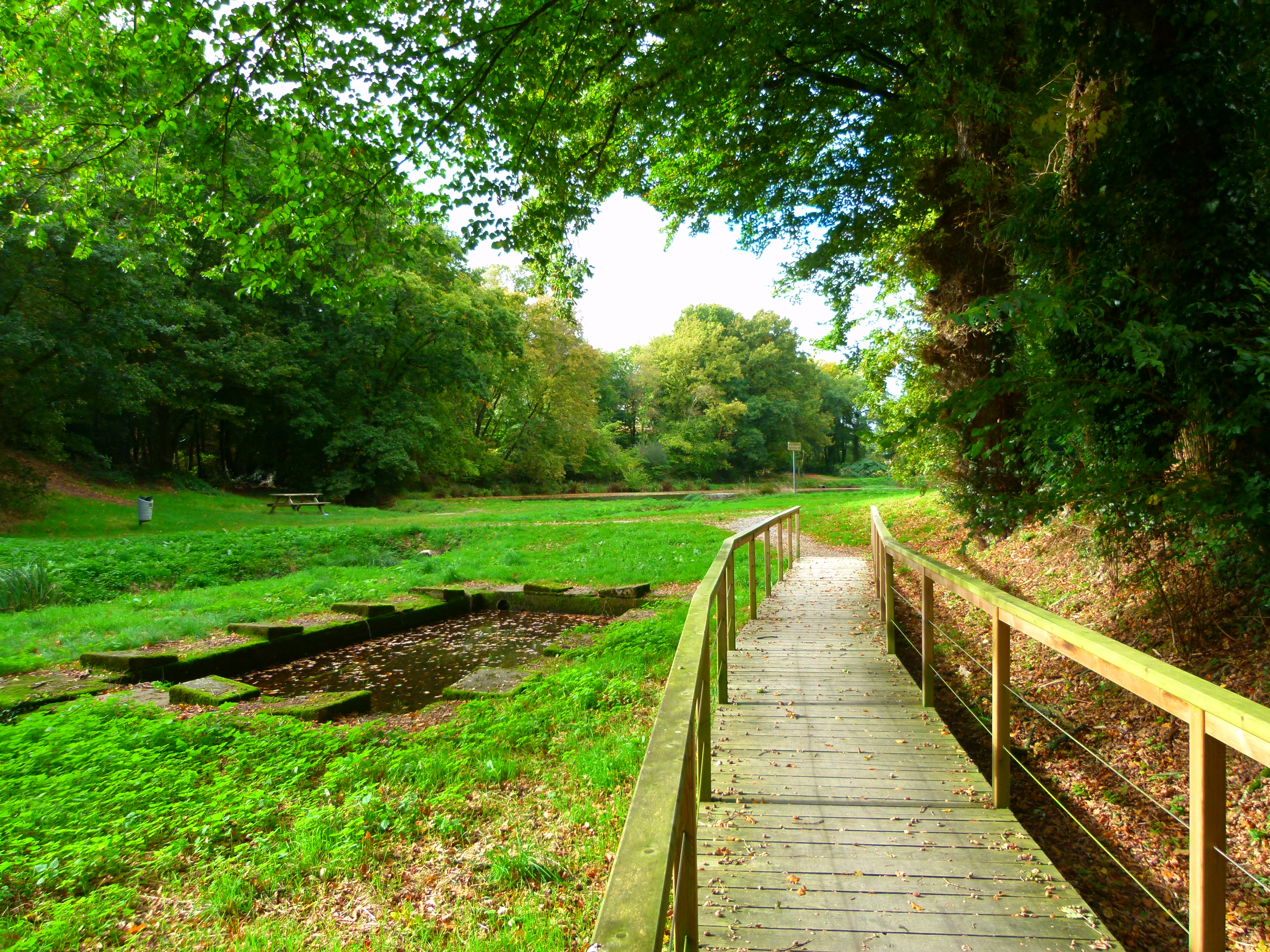
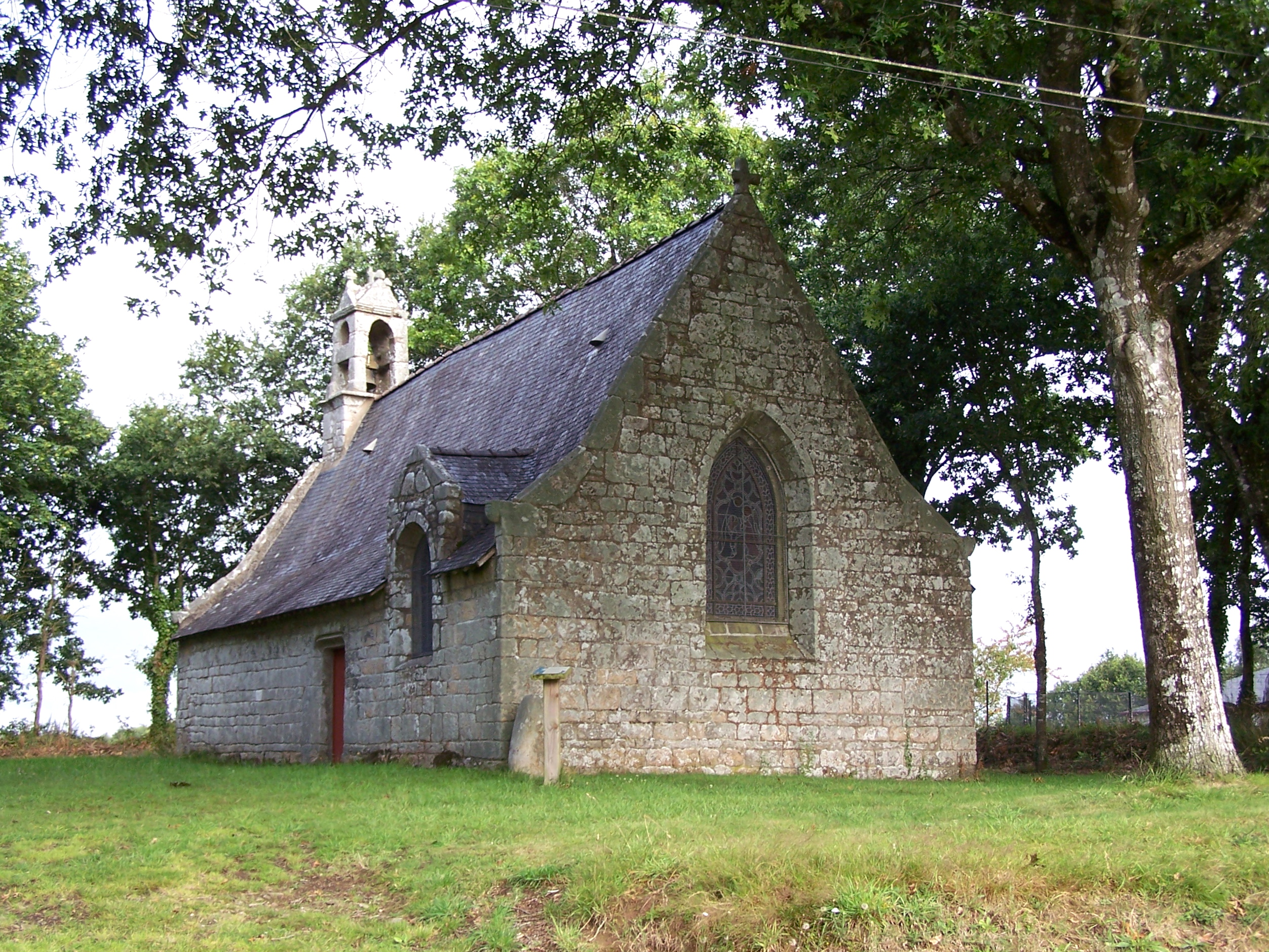
- Top to bottom; left to right : Our Lady of the Flowers chapel, Kersolan alignments, lockmaster's house of Minazen by th Blavet, Baud station, Pont-Screign wood, and the chapel of Kernec.

- Coat of arms
- Motto(s): To flower and to be fruitful (Breton: "Bleuein ha frehein", French: "Fleurir et fructifier")
- Location of Languidic
- Location within France Location within Brittany
- Coordinates: 47°50′03″N 3°09′24″W
- Country: France
- Region: Brittany
- Department: Morbihan
- Arrondissement: Lorient
- Canton: Hennebont
- Intercommunality: Lorient Agglomération

Government
  - Mayor (2026–32): Jérôme Le Dréan
- Area^{1}: 109.08 km^{2} (42.12 sq mi)
- Highest elevation: 126 m (413 ft)
- Lowest elevation: 7 m (23 ft)
- Population (2023): 8,042
  - Density: 73.73/km^{2} (190.9/sq mi)
- Time zone: UTC+01:00 (CET)
  - Summer (DST): UTC+02:00 (CEST)
- INSEE/Postal code: 56101 /56440
- Website: www.languidic.fr
- ^{1} French Land Register data, which excludes lakes, ponds, glaciers > 1 km^{2} (0.386 sq mi or 247 acres) and river estuaries.

Languidic (French pronunciation: [lɑ̃ɡidik]; Breton: Langedig) is a commune in the Morbihan department of Brittany in north-western France.

== History ==
The local church was previously associated with the cult of the Welsh saint Cenydd (Kenneth).

== Geography ==
Languidic, encompassing 10,908 hectares, is the most spread-out city in Morbihan and the third in Brittany. The river Ével forms part of the commune's north-eastern border, then flows into the Blavet, which forms its northern and north-western borders.

== Demographics ==
Inhabitants of Languidic are called in French Languidiciens.

Historical population
Year	Pop.	±% p.a.
1968	5,326	—
1975	5,223	−0.28%
1982	5,847	+1.63%
1990	6,350	+1.04%
1999	6,489	+0.24%
2007	7,175	+1.26%
2012	7,409	+0.64%
2017	7,971	+1.47%
2023	8,042	+0.15%
Source: INSEE

== Breton language ==
In 2008, there was 18,1% of the children attended the bilingual schools in primary education. In 2013, there was 200 children in bilingual schools (primary education).

== Twinning ==
Languidic is twinned with :

- Great Cornard, England since 21 October 1989.
- Rimpar, Germany since July 1997.

== See also ==
- Communes of the Morbihan department
- Henri Gouzien, sculptor of Languidic War Memorial
