= Henri Gouzien =

Henri Gouzien was born in 1889 in Lorient in Morbihan. Most of his recorded work involves sculptural work for war memorials in the Morbihan area and many of his compositions include a grieving woman in Breton costume.

== Works ==
Name	Date	Notes
The war memorial of Rochefort-en-Terre	1924	The first move to remember the men born in Rochefort-en-Terre who died in the 1914-1918 war was the erection in November 1919, of a plaque opposite the church listing the names of the dead. The artist Alfred Klots then completed a triptych painted in oils and showing scenes from the life of a soldier. Then a war memorial was inaugurated and Gouzien carried out the sculptural work which involved the depiction of a soldier.
The war memorial of Languidic		Gouzien's composition involves an obelisk which carries the inscriptions "REQUIEXANT IN PACE" and "Aux enfants de Languiduic morts pour la patrie" These inscriptions are written in Breton and French, and in front of the obelisk is a sculpture of a praying woman in Breton dress.
The war memorial of Baud	1923	Gouzien's composition is carved from granite and kersantite, and depicts a couple in mourning. They wear regional dress and the military helmet of the son they have lost lies at their feet. It is a most poignant composition. On the pedestal are four bas-reliefs by Gouzien, these showing various stages of a soldier's life. In the first he is depicted departing for the front by train. The second shows fighting in the trenches and the third shows him returning home. Gouzien however reminds us that many did not return and to underline this the fourth panel depicts soldier's graves.
The war memorial of Arzano	1922	The war memorial of Arzano depicts a helmeted soldier throwing a grenade.
The war memorial of Pluméliau	1924	Inscriptions read "PLUMELIAU A SES ENFANTS MORTS POUR LA FRANCE 1914-1918 1939-1945 ARTOIS CHAMPAGNE DIXMUDE-VERDUN-LA MARNE" and "CE MONUMENT A ETE ERIGE LE 8 MARS 1924 Mr GILLET ETANT MAIRE Mr SAUVAGE RECTEUR AVEC LE CONCOURS DE Mr BELLEC ANCIEN MAIRE Mr LE MAGUET ADJOINT"
The war memorial of Bignan	1923	159 men from this small town in Brittany laid down their lives during World War I as well as many who disappeared during the German occupation of World War II and some victims of the Algerian War. The old war memorial which had been inaugurated on 4 November 1923, had to be replaced when the town centre underwent major reconstruction. It was Gouzien who had carried out the sculptural work on the old memorial.
Monument dedicated to Louis Nail	1923	This monument involves a tall column decorated with a médaillon in bronze by Gouzien and stands at the entrance to the fishing port at Keroman. Nail was a local politician in Lorient and had supported Keroman becoming a fishing port for many years.
