= Rochefort-en-Terre =

Rochefort-en-Terre Roc'h-an-Argoed
- Commune
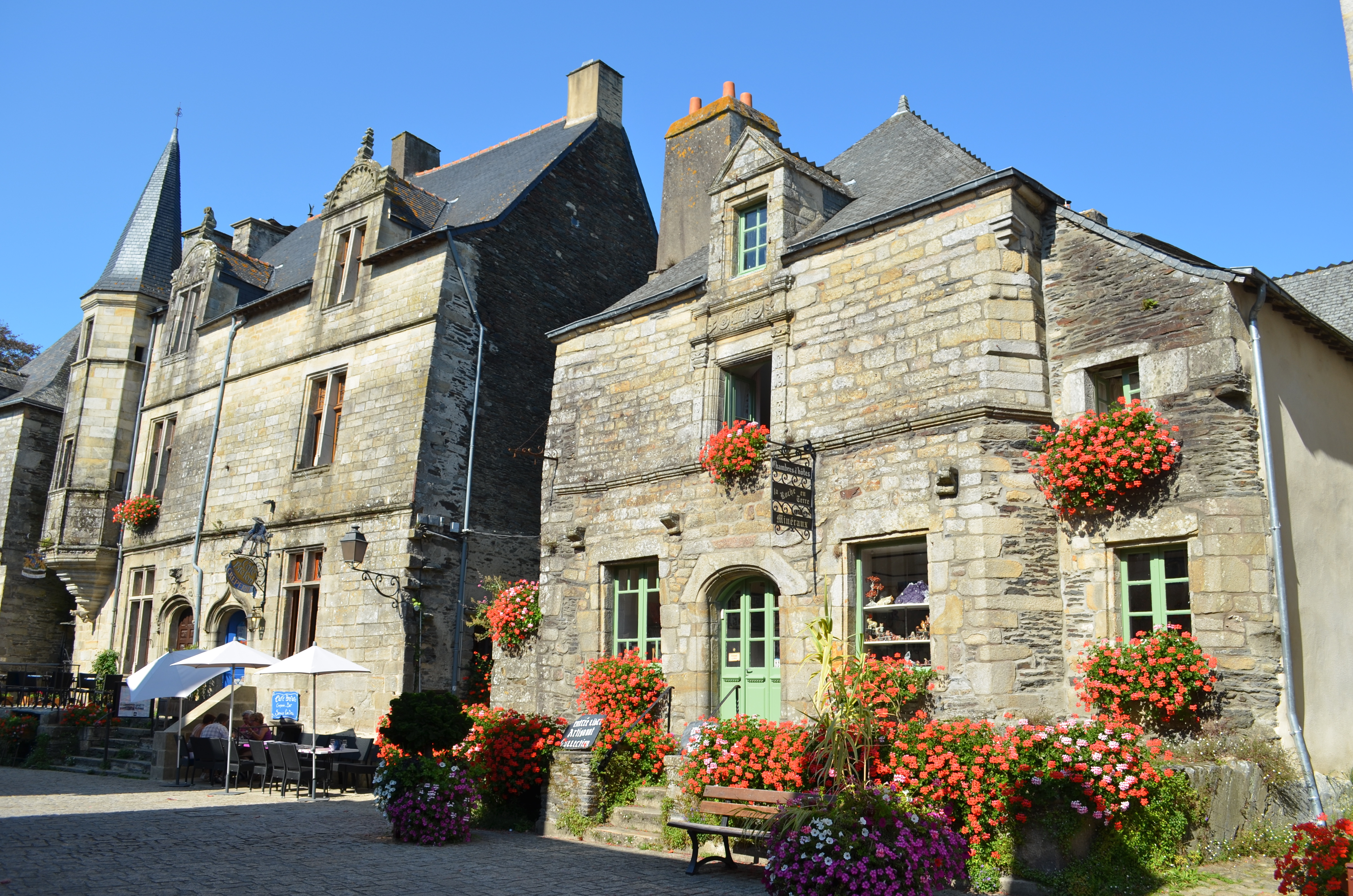
- Medieval houses at Rochefort-en-Terre

- Coat of arms
- Location of Rochefort-en-Terre
- Location within France Location within Brittany
- Coordinates: 47°42′01″N 2°20′07″W
- Country: France
- Region: Brittany
- Department: Morbihan
- Arrondissement: Vannes
- Canton: Questembert

Government
  - Mayor (2026–32): Stéphane Combeau
- Area^{1}: 1.22 km^{2} (0.47 sq mi)
- Highest elevation: 80 m (260 ft)
- Lowest elevation: 22 m (72 ft)
- Population (2023): 647
  - Density: 530/km^{2} (1,370/sq mi)
- Time zone: UTC+01:00 (CET)
  - Summer (DST): UTC+02:00 (CEST)
- INSEE/Postal code: 56196 /56220
- ^{1} French Land Register data, which excludes lakes, ponds, glaciers > 1 km^{2} (0.386 sq mi or 247 acres) and river estuaries.

Rochefort-en-Terre (French pronunciation: [ʁɔʃfɔʁ ɑ̃ tɛʁ]; Breton: Roc'h-an-Argoed) is a commune in the Morbihan department of Brittany, in north-western France.

Rochefort-en-Terre is a designated Petite Cité de Caractère and one of Les Plus Beaux Villages de France.

The medieval château in the town was the home of American painter Alfred Klots. He purchased it in the early 1900s and oversaw its restoration. His son Trafford Klots inherited the château and continued to paint there and entertain other visiting artists. After his death his wife gave the building to the French government. In the grounds of the building is the NAIA museum, named after an early-twentieth-century witch who lived in the town. It houses a small collection of fantasy and kinetic art and sculpture.

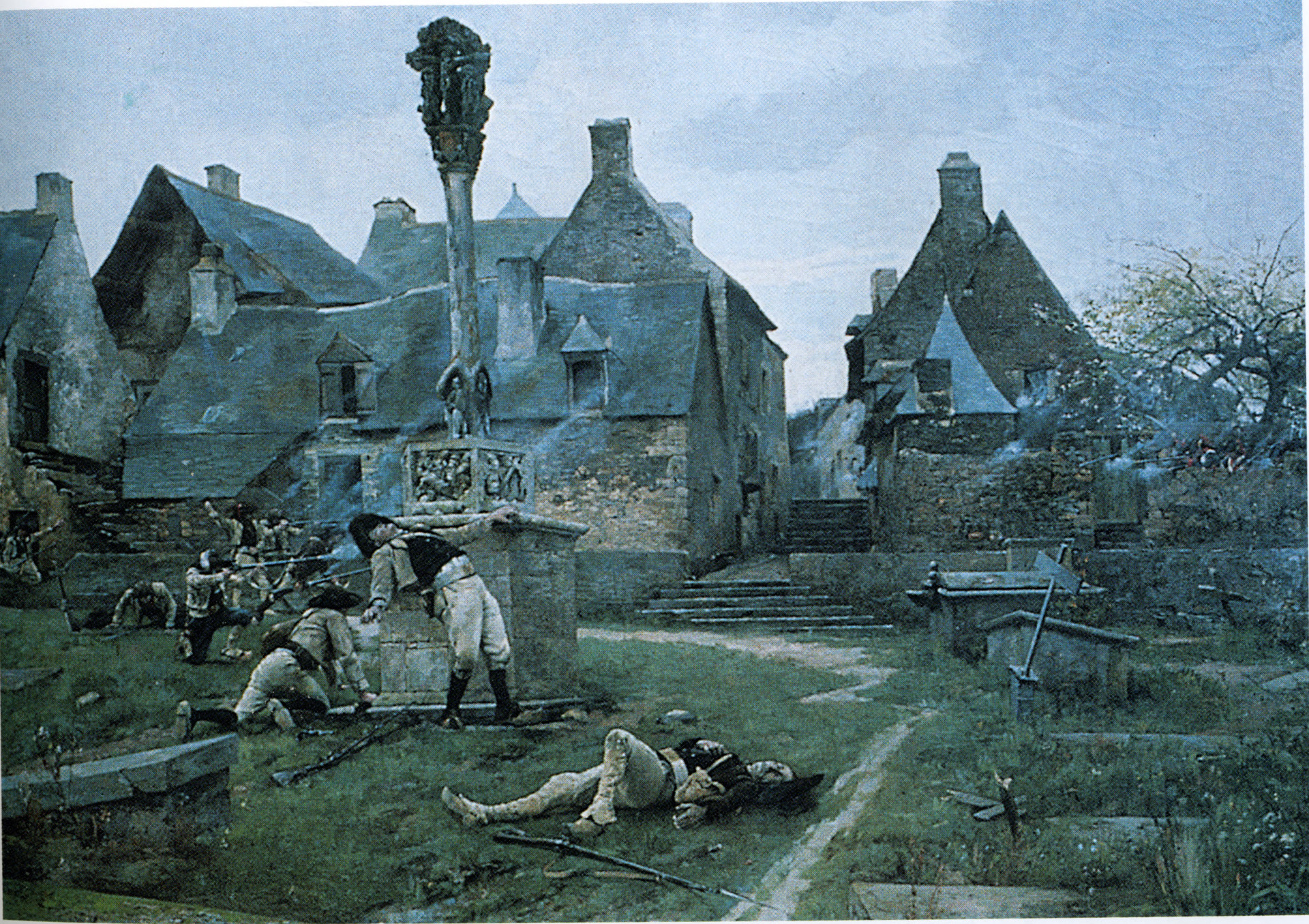
The defence of Rochefort-en-Terre during the Chouannerie (Royalist uprising against the French Revolution) - painting by Alexandre Bloch, 1885.

== Demographics ==
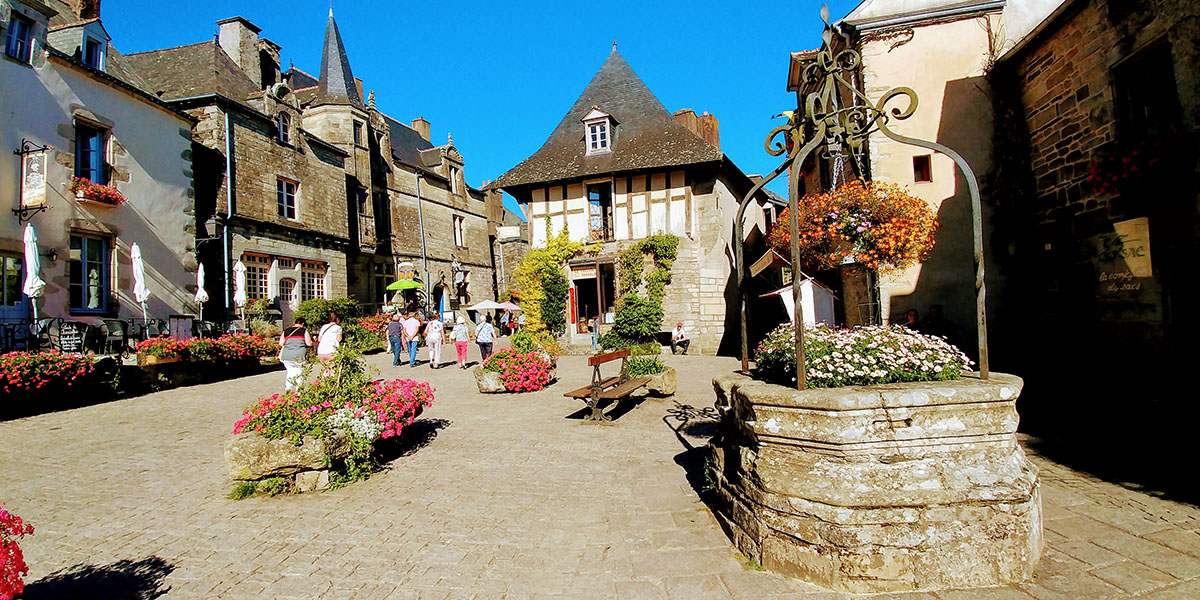
The Well Square in Rochefort-en-Terre

Inhabitants of Rochefort-en-Terre are called in French Rochefortais.

== See also ==
- Communes of the Morbihan department
- Henri Gouzien Sculptor of Rochefort-en-Terre War Memorial
