= Canton of Hennebont =

Coordinates: 47.80°N 3.28°W

Hennebont
- Canton
- Interactive map of Hennebont
- Country: France
- Region: Brittany
- Department: Morbihan
- No. of communes: {{{nbcomm}}}

Government
  - Representatives (2021–2028): Muriel Jourda; Stephane Lohezic
- Area: 185.92 km^{2} (71.78 sq mi)
- Population (2023): 43,722
  - Density: 235.17/km^{2} (609.08/sq mi)
- INSEE code: 56 06

The canton of Hennebont is an administrative division of the Morbihan department, northwestern France. Its borders were modified at the French canton reorganisation which came into effect in March 2015. Its seat is in Hennebont.

== Composition ==
It consists of the following communes:

1. Hennebont
2. Kervignac
3. Languidic
4. Locmiquélic
5. Port-Louis
6. Riantec

== Councillors ==
Election	Councillors	Party	Occupation
2015	Muriel Jourda	LR	Former Mayor of Port-Louis; Former Councillor of Port-Louis; Senator for Morbihan
2015	Jacques Le Ludec	LR	Mayor of Kervignac

== Pictures of the canton ==
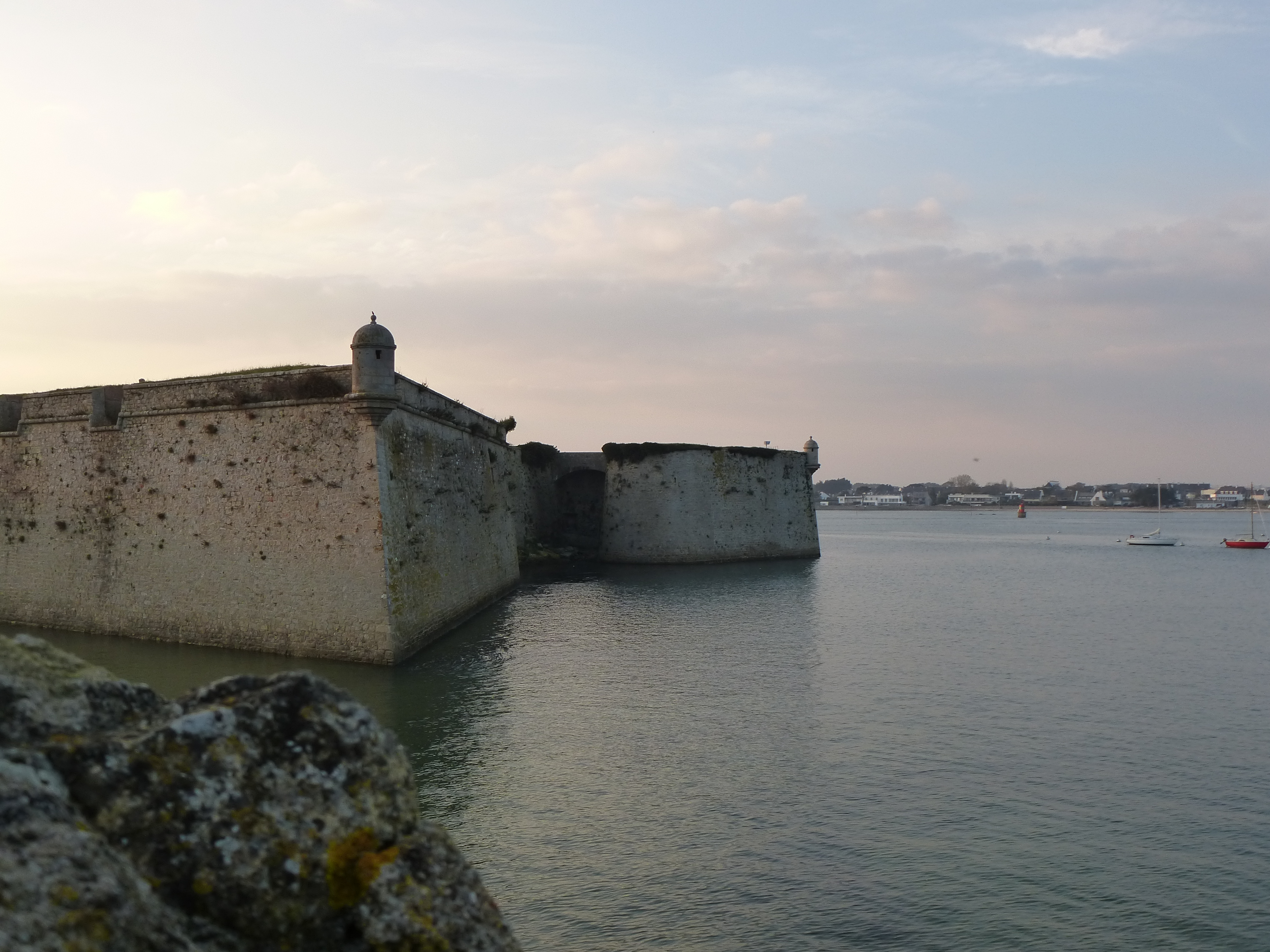
Citadel of Port-Louis

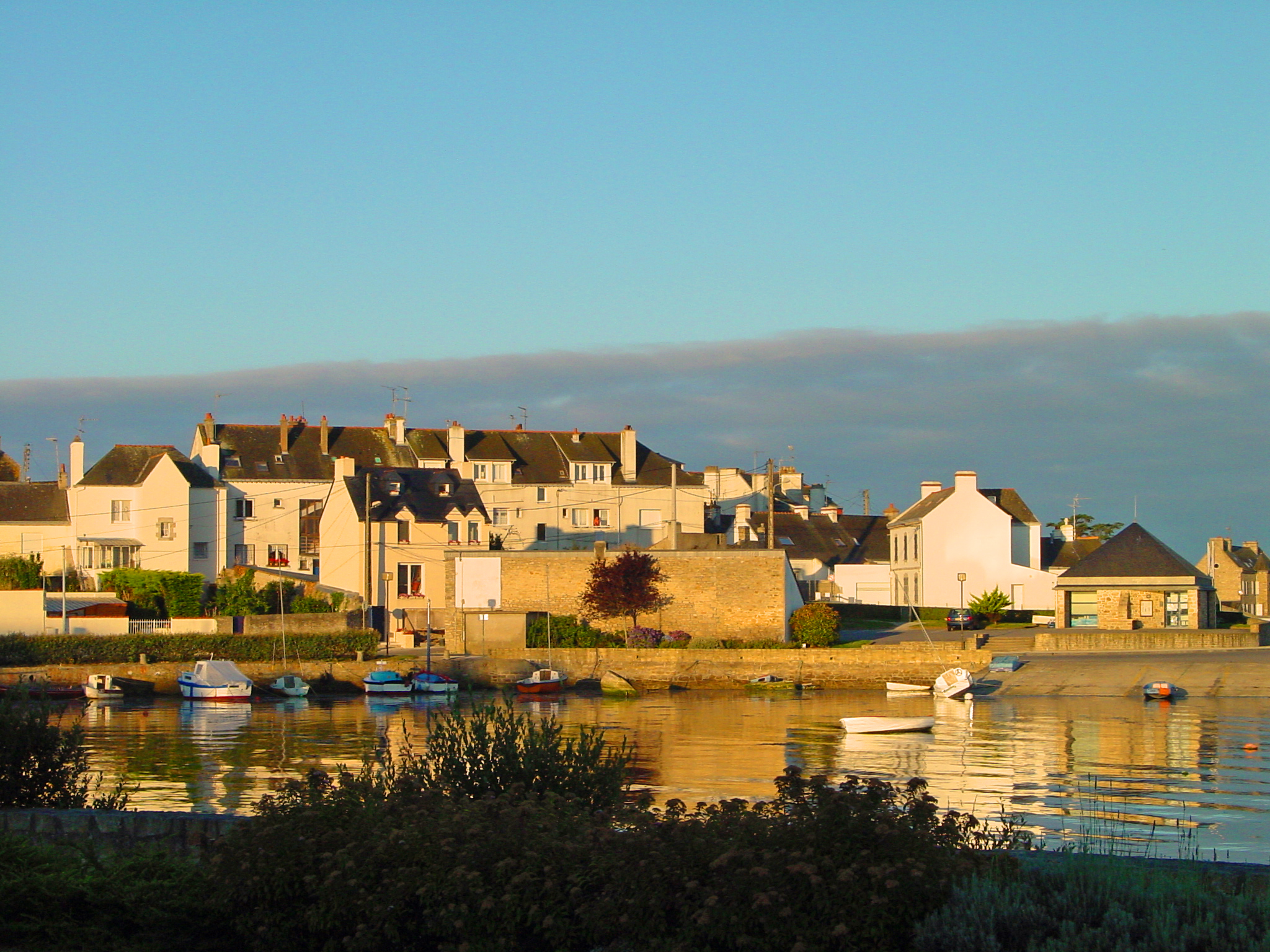
View of Locmiquélic

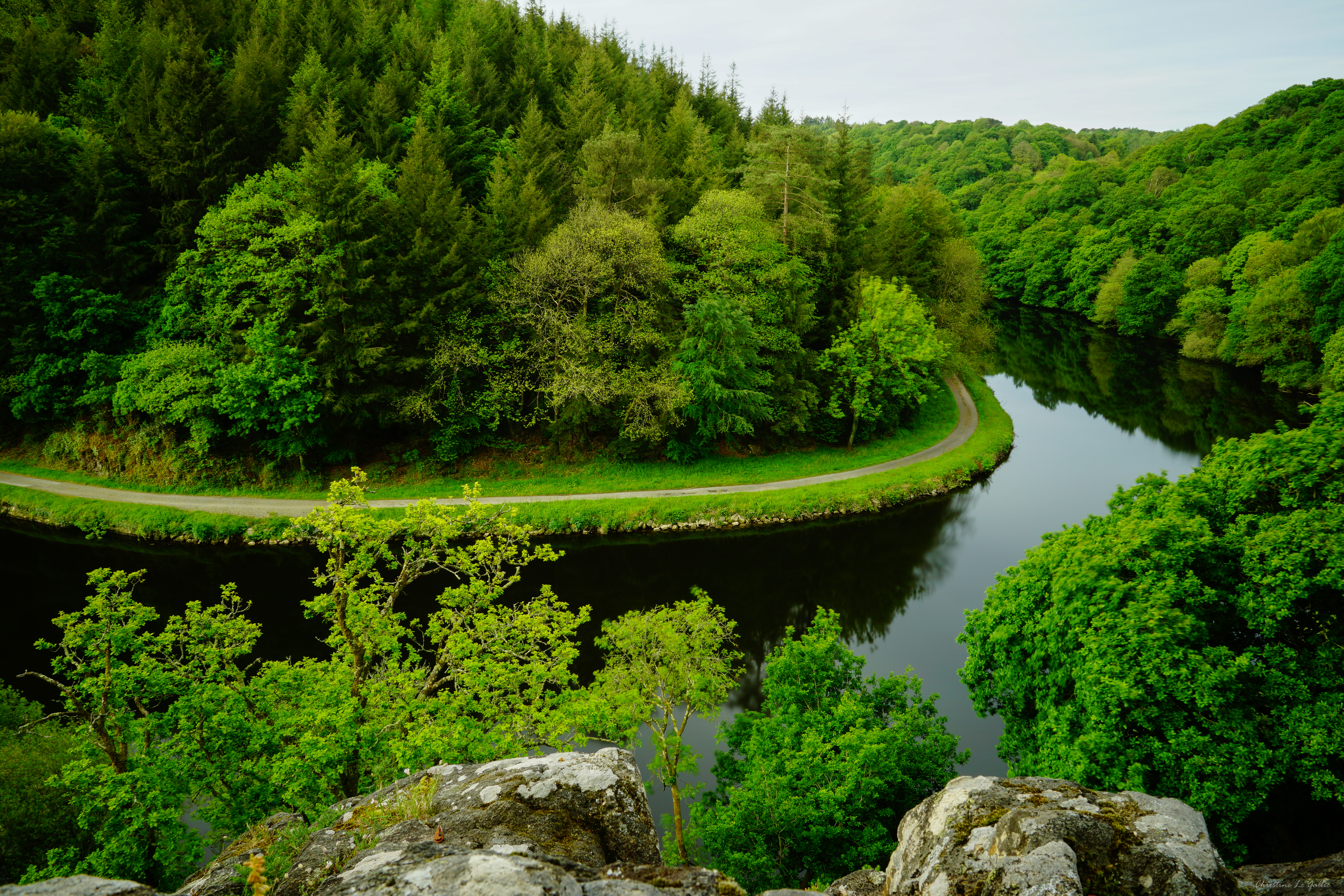
View of Blavet valley in Languidic
