= Arzano =

- Comune
- Comune di Arzano
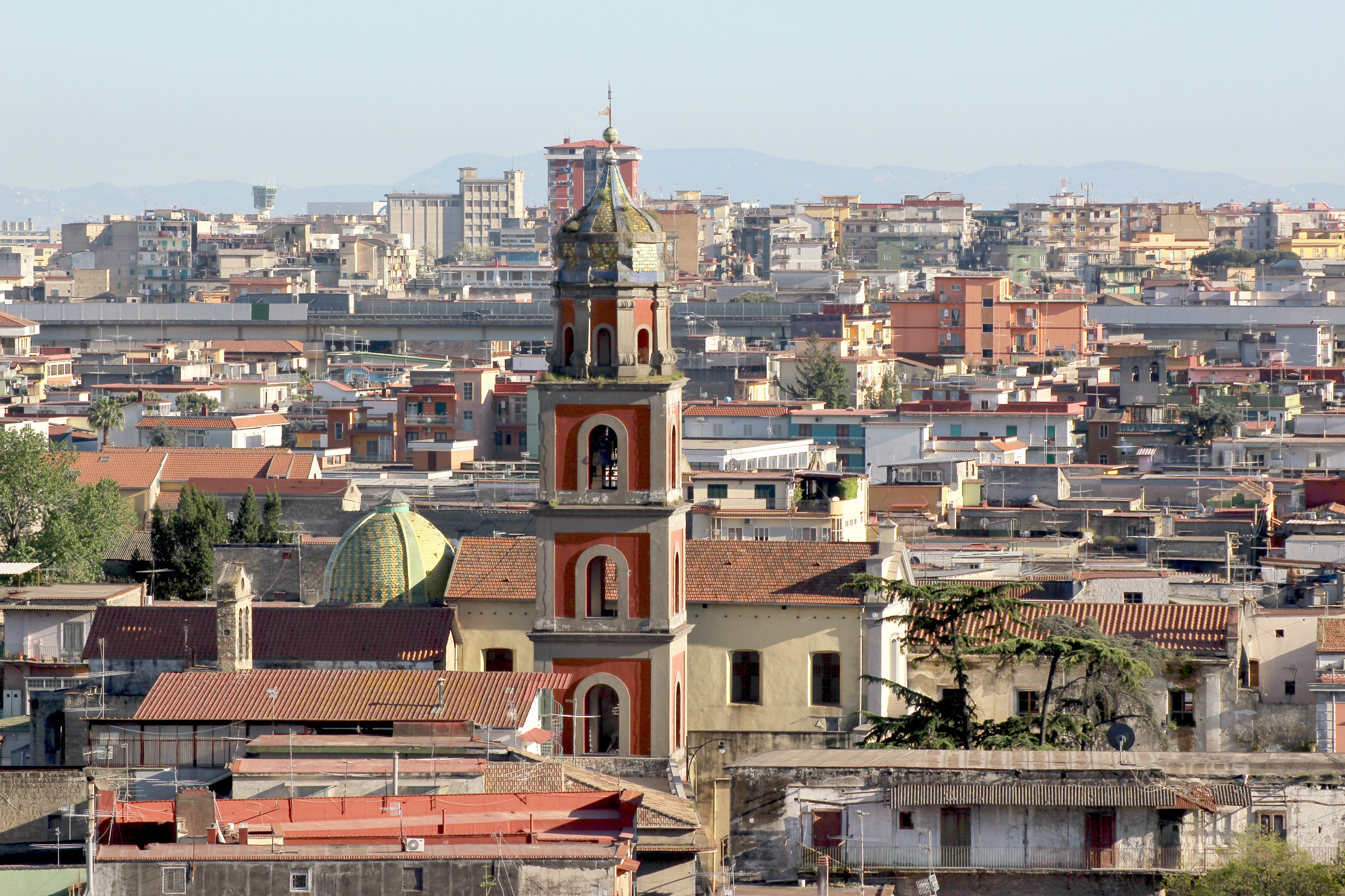

- Coat of arms

- Location within Italy Location within Campania
- Coordinates: 40°55′N 14°16′E
- Country: Italy
- Region: Campania
- Metropolitan city: Naples (NA)

Government
  - Mayor: Umberto Cimmino, Savina Macchiarella, Cinzia Picucci (commissars)

Area
  - Total: 4.68 km^{2} (1.81 sq mi)
- Elevation: 74 m (243 ft)

Population (31 August 2015)
  - Total: 34,922
  - Density: 7,460/km^{2} (19,300/sq mi)
- Demonym: Arzanesi
- Time zone: UTC+1 (CET)
  - Summer (DST): UTC+2 (CEST)
- Postal code: 80022
- Dialing code: (+39) 081

Arzano is a comune (municipality) in the Metropolitan City of Naples in the Italian region Campania, located about 9 km (5.6 mi) north of Naples.

Arzano borders the following municipalities: Casandrino, Casavatore, Casoria, Frattamaggiore, Grumo Nevano, Naples.

== Twin towns ==
- Arzano, France
- Cléguer, France
