= Port-Louis, Morbihan =

Port-Louis Porzh-Loeiz
- Commune
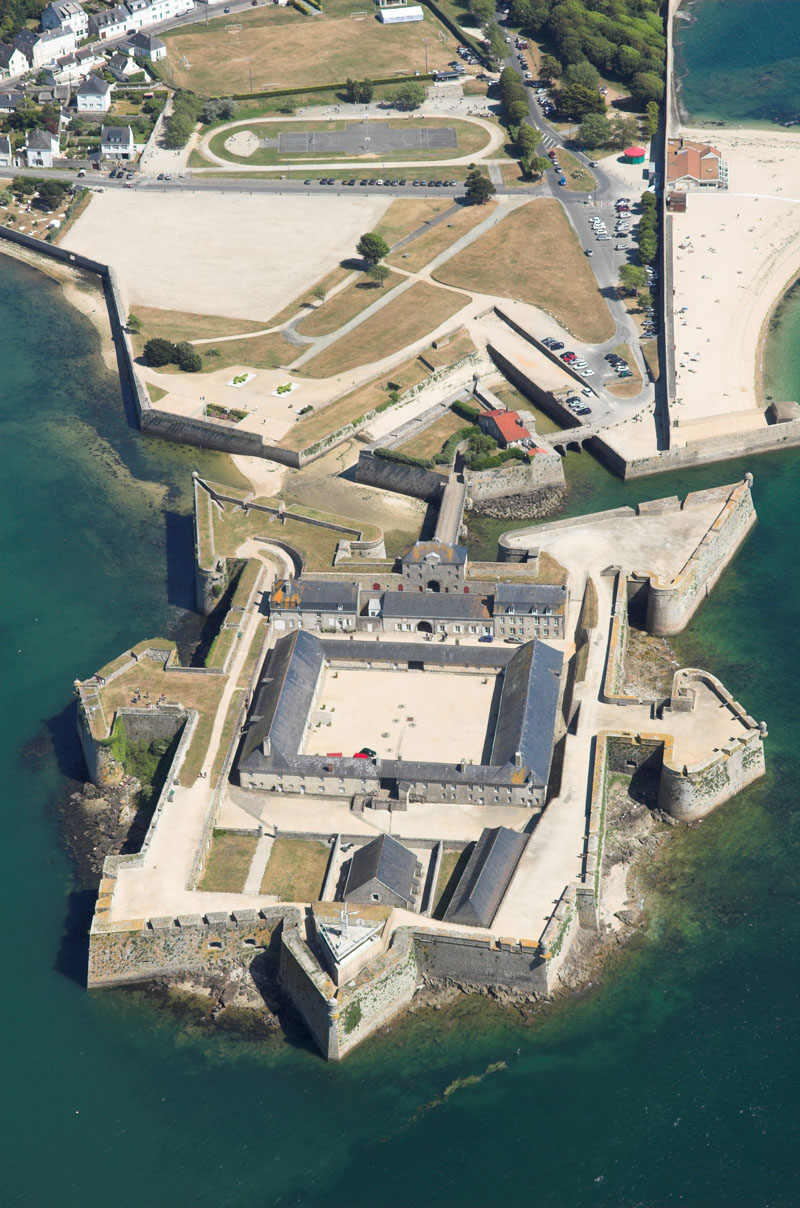
- Citadel of Port-Louis

- Flag Coat of arms
- Location of Port-Louis
- Location within France Location within Brittany
- Coordinates: 47°42′26″N 3°21′07″W
- Country: France
- Region: Brittany
- Department: Morbihan
- Arrondissement: Lorient
- Canton: Hennebont
- Intercommunality: Lorient Agglomération

Government
  - Mayor (2026–32): Martine Pasgrimaud
- Area^{1}: 1.07 km^{2} (0.41 sq mi)
- Highest elevation: 14 m (46 ft)
- Lowest elevation: 0 m (0 ft)
- Population (2023): 2,608
  - Density: 2,440/km^{2} (6,310/sq mi)
- Time zone: UTC+01:00 (CET)
  - Summer (DST): UTC+02:00 (CEST)
- INSEE/Postal code: 56181 /56290
- ^{1} French Land Register data, which excludes lakes, ponds, glaciers > 1 km^{2} (0.386 sq mi or 247 acres) and river estuaries.

Port-Louis (French pronunciation: [pɔʁ lwi]; Breton: Porzh-Loeiz) is a commune in the Morbihan department of Brittany in northwestern France.

== History ==
At the beginning of the 17th century, merchants who were trading with India established warehouses in Port-Louis. They later built additional warehouses across the bay in 1628, at the location which became known as "L'Orient" (the Orient in French). In 1664, during the reign of King Louis XIV, the French East India Company was established at Port-Louis. The company established a shipyard at Lorient. The Company was not able to maintain itself financially, and it was abolished in 1769. In 1770, King Louis XVI issued an edict that required the Company to transfer to the state all its properties, in return for which the King agreed to pay all of the Company’s debts and obligations. The French government then took over the shipyards as a naval port and arsenal.

== Citadel ==
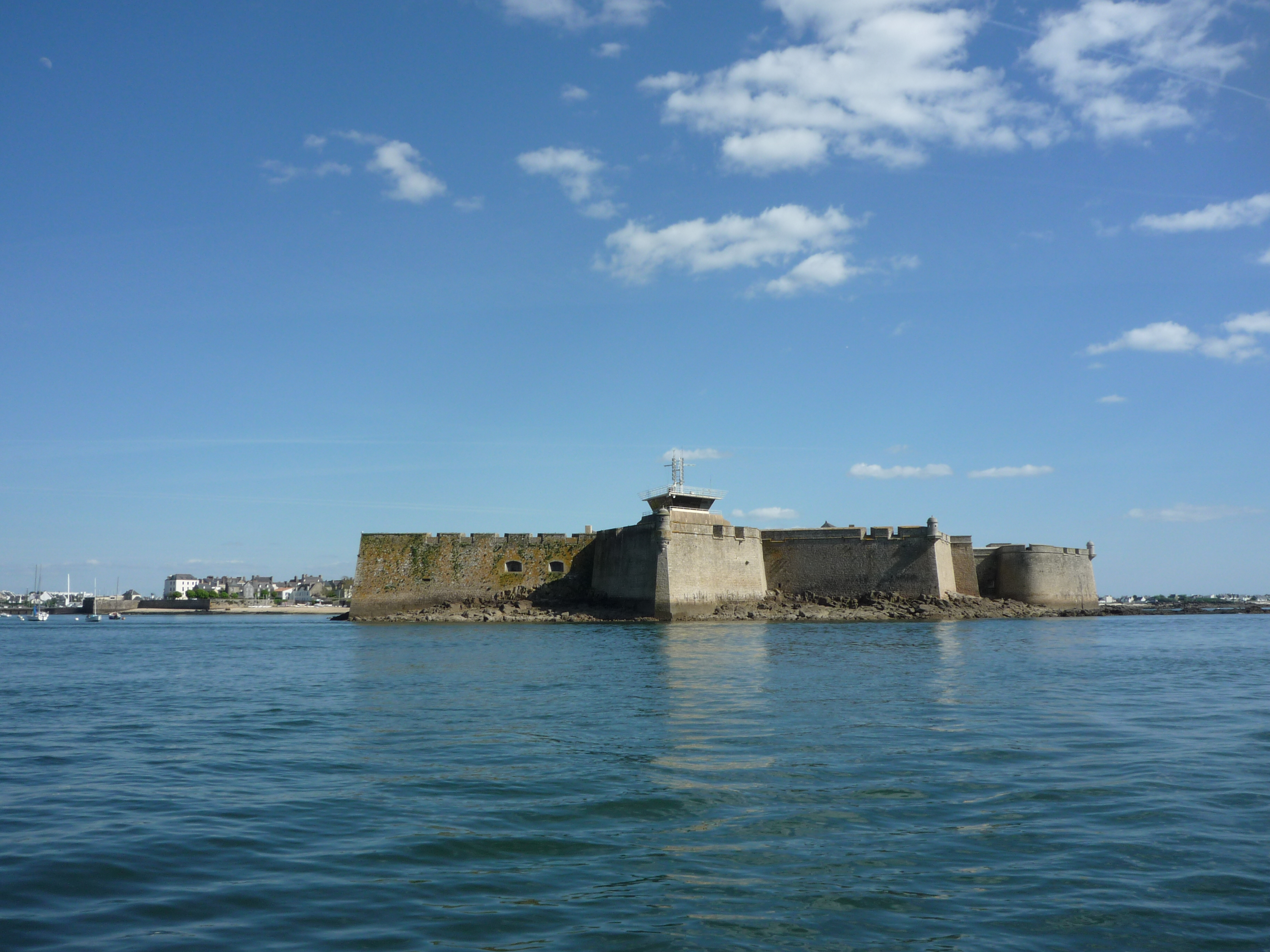
The Citadel of Port-Louis, viewed from the water.

The Spanish engineer Cristóbal de Rojas built the Fuerte de Águila at the start of the Brittany Campaign in 1590 at what was then known as Port Blavet during the War of the Catholic League. At the time, the governor of Brittany, Philippe Emmanuel, Duke of Mercœur, a Catholic, was in revolt against the new Protestant king Henry IV, and the Spanish were invited to provide support to their coreligionists. Henry converted to Catholicism in 1593, and eventually defeated de Mercœur in 1598, gaining control of the fort. The fort was extended in 1616–1636, during the reign of King Louis XIII. In 1836 Louis Napoleon, who would later become the emperor Napoleon III, was a prisoner in the citadel. Later prisoners included 1836 Communards and members of the French Resistance, among others.

Today, the citadel houses four museums:

- Museum of the French East India Company (Musée de la Compagnie des Indes)
- Museum of Naval Weapons (Musée des Armes Navales)
- Museum of Port-Louis and the Citadel (Musée de Port-Louis et de la Citadelle)
- Museum of the Arsenal (Musée de l'Arsenal)

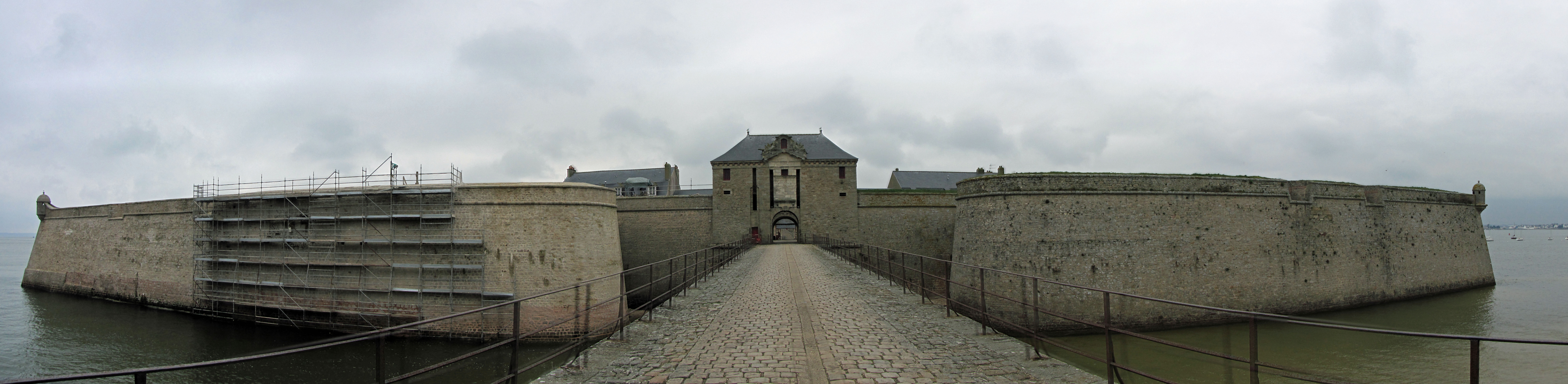
Citadel

== Population ==
Inhabitants of Port-Louis are called in French Port-Louisiens.

Historical population
Year	Pop.	±% p.a.
1968	3,921	—
1975	3,715	−0.77%
1982	3,327	−1.56%
1990	2,986	−1.34%
1999	2,808	−0.68%
2007	2,992	+0.80%
2012	2,685	−2.14%
2017	2,618	−0.50%
2023	2,608	−0.06%
Source: INSEE

== See also ==
- Communes of the Morbihan department
