= Arzano, Finistère =

Arzano An Arzhanaou
- Commune
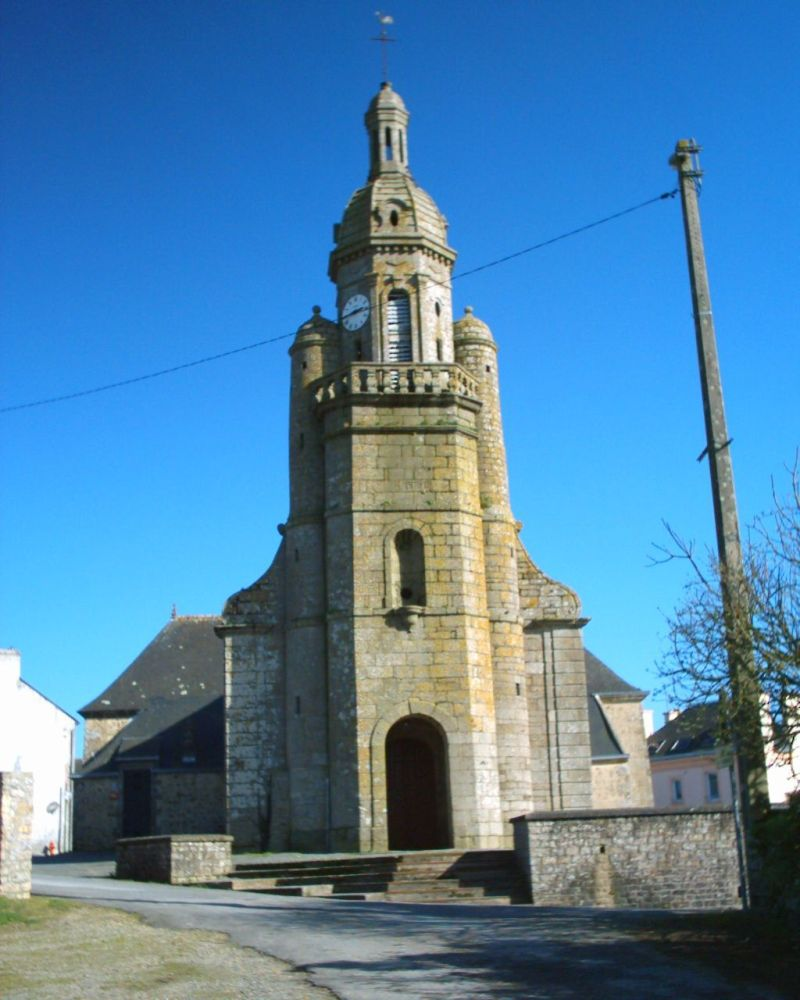
- The parish church of Saint-Pierre-aux-Liens, in Arzano

- Coat of arms
- Location of Arzano
- Location within France Location within Brittany
- Coordinates: 47°54′07″N 3°26′20″W
- Country: France
- Region: Brittany
- Department: Finistère
- Arrondissement: Quimper
- Canton: Quimperlé
- Intercommunality: CA Quimperlé Communauté

Government
  - Mayor (2020–2026): Anne Borry
- Area^{1}: 34.04 km^{2} (13.14 sq mi)
- Population (2023): 1,441
  - Density: 42.33/km^{2} (109.6/sq mi)
- Time zone: UTC+01:00 (CET)
  - Summer (DST): UTC+02:00 (CEST)
- INSEE/Postal code: 29002 /29300
- ^{1} French Land Register data, which excludes lakes, ponds, glaciers > 1 km^{2} (0.386 sq mi or 247 acres) and river estuaries.

Arzano (French pronunciation: [aʁzano]; Breton: An Arzhanaou) is a commune in the Finistère department in Brittany in northwestern France. It lies on the D22 road.

== Population ==
Inhabitants of Arzano are called Arzanois.

Historical population

Year	Pop.	±% p.a.
1806	1,757	—
1821	1,834	+0.29%
1831	1,873	+0.21%
1836	1,957	+0.88%
1841	1,801	−1.65%
1846	1,917	+1.26%
1851	1,957	+0.41%
1856	1,874	−0.86%
1861	1,862	−0.13%
1866	1,877	+0.16%
1872	1,779	−0.89%
1876	1,861	+1.13%
1881	1,948	+0.92%
1886	1,952	+0.04%
1891	1,943	−0.09%
1896	1,948	+0.05%
1901	1,851	−1.02%
1906	1,917	+0.70%

Year	Pop.	±% p.a.
1911	1,941	+0.25%
1921	1,738	−1.10%
1926	1,839	+1.14%
1931	1,793	−0.51%
1936	1,676	−1.34%
1946	1,766	+0.52%
1954	1,524	−1.83%
1962	1,310	−1.87%
1968	1,206	−1.37%
1975	1,103	−1.27%
1982	1,113	+0.13%
1990	1,224	+1.20%
1999	1,324	+0.88%
2007	1,363	+0.36%
2012	1,396	+0.48%
2017	1,387	−0.13%
2023	1,441	+0.64%

Source: EHESS and INSEE (1968–2023)

== Geography ==
The village centre is located 9 km (5.6 mi) northeast of Quimperlé. Arzano belongs historically to Vannetais. The river Ellé forms the commune's western border and the river Scorff forms the commune's eastern border.

== Map ==
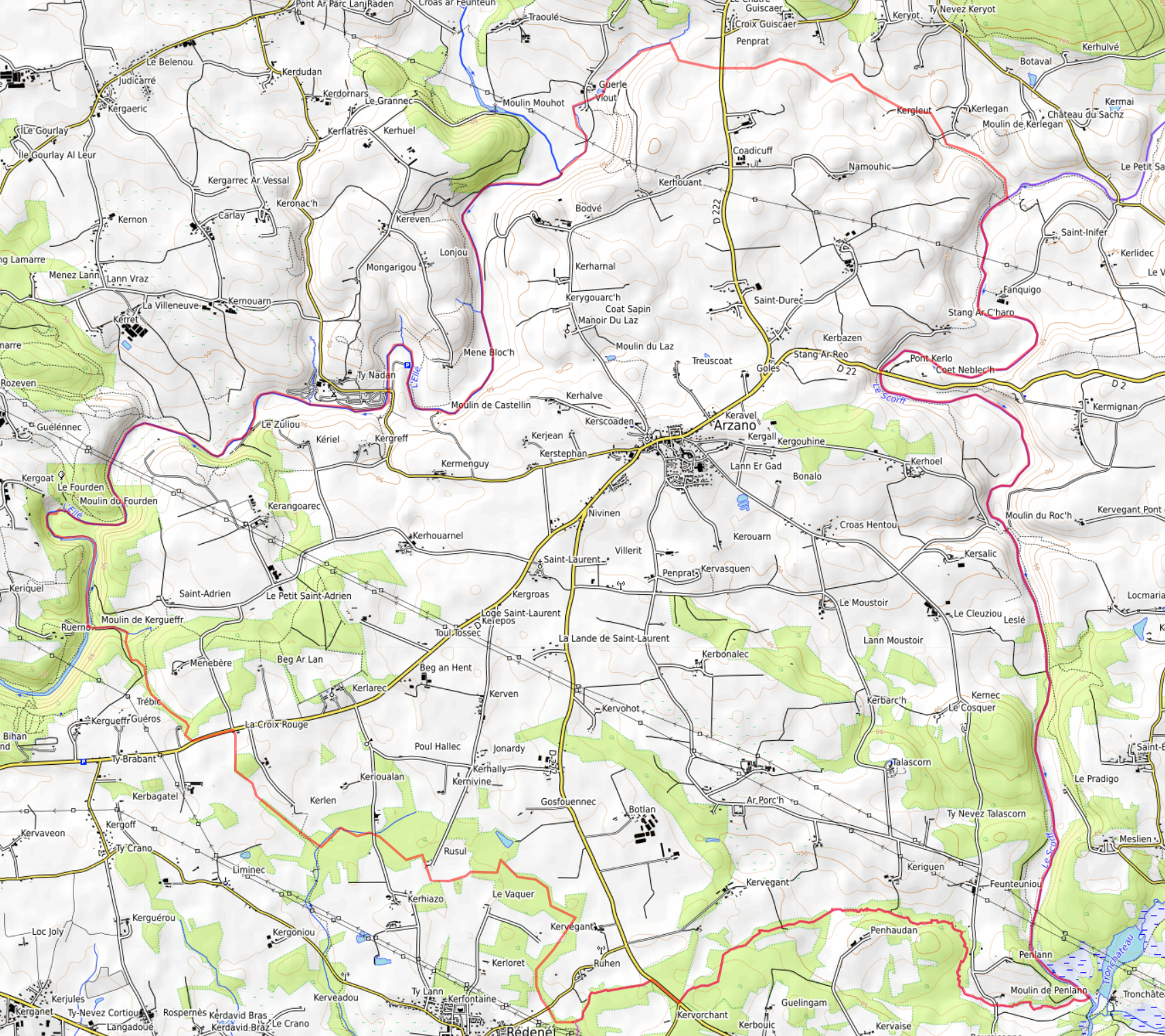
Topographic map

== Sights ==
The commune contains the ruins of the Château de La Roche-Moysan, Château de Kerlarec (19th century) and the 16th century Saint-Laurent church.

== See also ==
- Communes of the Finistère department
- Henri Gouzien, sculptor of Arzano War Memorial
