= History of Lorient =

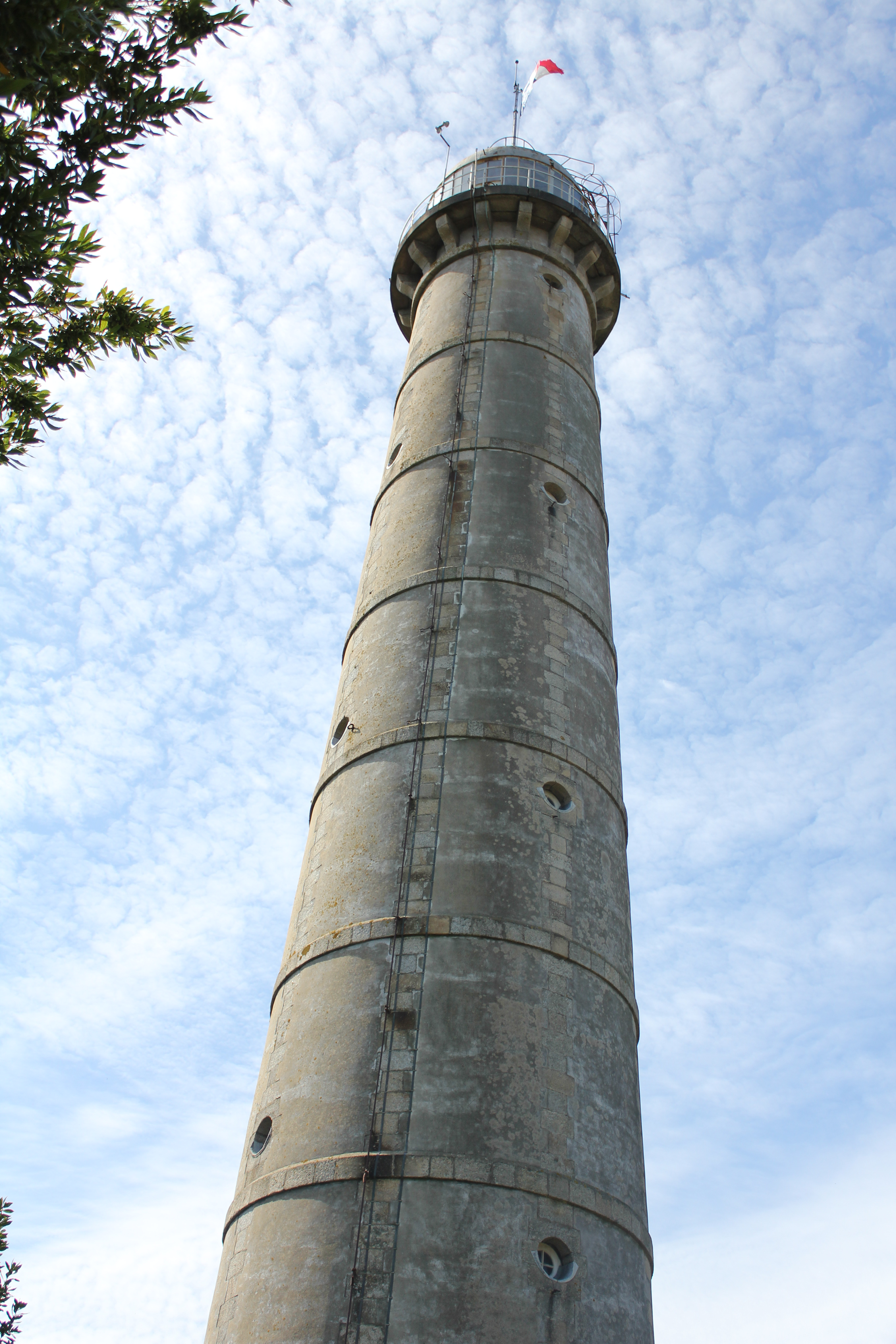
The Discovery Tower in the harbor enclosure, dating back to the Compagnie Perpétuelle des Indes, is one of the last vestiges of this era still visible.

The history of Lorient begins with the town's foundation in 1666 as a base for the French East India Company. This role was reinforced in 1675 during the Dutch War, when it was decided to abandon the company's other base in Le Havre in favor of Lorient alone. Other monopoly trading companies subsequently moved in and used the port and surrounding enclosure until the end of the Ancien Régime, helping to provide the town with its facilities; the site thus became the main agglomeration in southern Brittany from the mid-18th century onwards. From 1688, the port was also used by the Royal Navy, which had its ships built and armed there.

Lorient's political influence grew stronger after the French Revolution, and the city took on an administrative role under the First Empire. While commercial activities remained low-key in the first half of the 19th century due to frequent conflicts, military activities gained in importance. The arsenals benefited from successive waves of modernization driven by steam power, followed by steel construction. From the end of the 19th century, the development of the fishing industry brought a new pole of activity to the town, which was strengthened by the creation of the Keroman fishing port in the early 1920s.

The Second World War was a key period in the town's history. The Keroman peninsula was chosen by the occupying forces to house the largest submarine base of the time, leading to the almost total destruction of the town by Allied bombing between January and February 1943. The occupation of the city lasted until the surrender of the Lorient pocket on May 10, 1945. This marked the start of an era of reconstruction that would create a new face for the city, lasting until the early 1960s.

The town's recent history has been marked by a series of successive crises, caused by the decline in activity at the Keroman fishing port in the 1980s and 1990s, and the closure of the submarine base in 1997. The city then embarked on a phase of reconversion, marked by cultural development driven by its Interceltic Festival, university development driven by the opening of the University of Southern Brittany in 1995, and economic development based on activities linked to yachting and offshore racing.

== Before the town ==
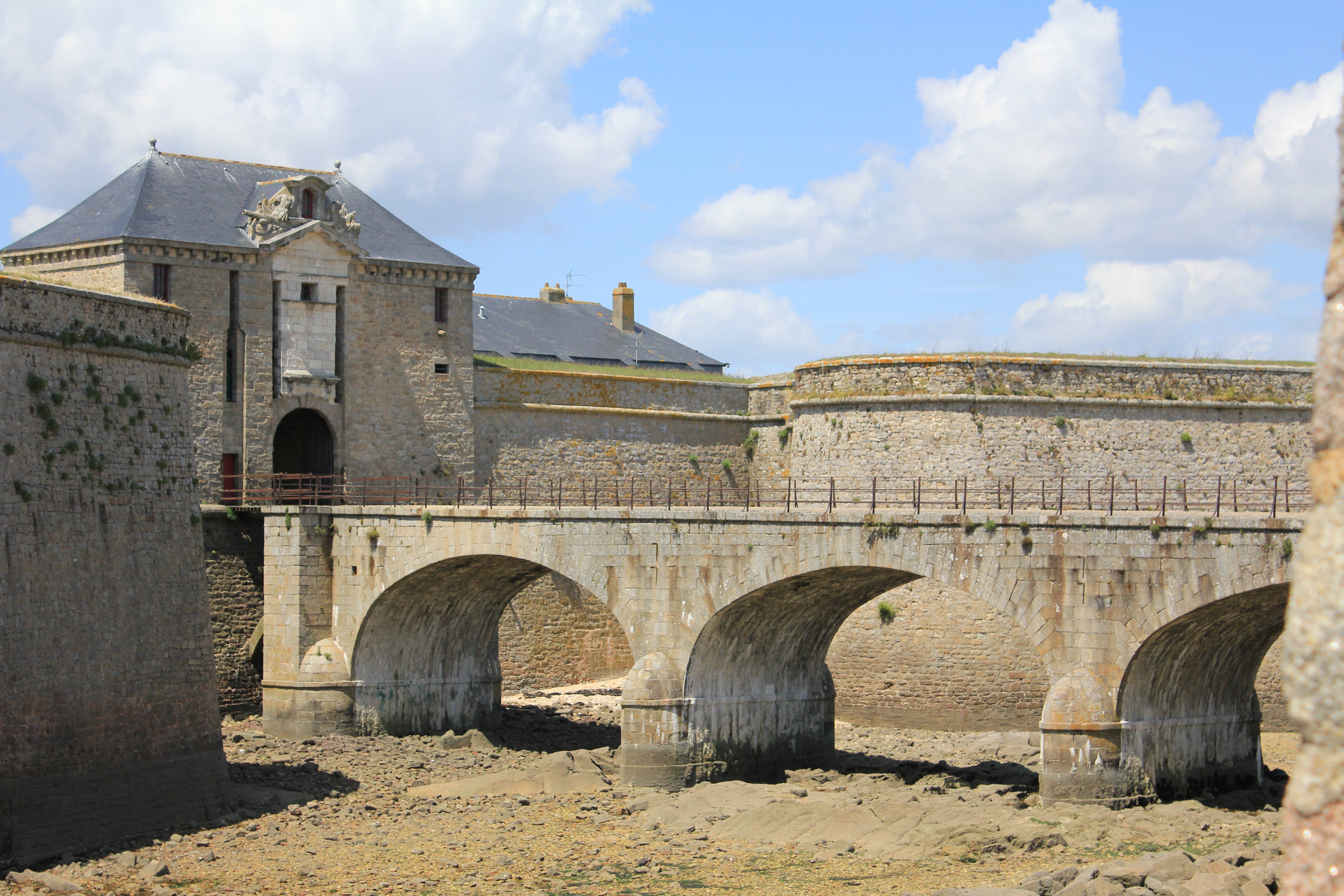
The Port-Louis citadel.

The oldest traces of human presence in the region date back to the Neolithic period, and are attested by the discovery of polished axes in the Kerolay district.

In the Middle Ages, the mouth of the Blavet became a frontier zone from the 11th century onwards. Its left bank belonged to the châtellenie de Nostang, a ducal and then royal land, while its right bank, where Lorient was to be established, belonged to the Kemenet-Héboé, long a possession of the Viscounts of Rohan. Between 1264 and 1278, the walled town of Hennebont was founded on the left bank of the Blavet and became the seat of the châtellenie de Nostang.

At the end of the 16th century, the town of Port-Louis at the mouth of the Blavet began to take on military and commercial importance following the wars of the League, and a citadel was built there from 1590 to secure the entrance to the harbor where the Blavet flows. The shipowners who had been based in Hennebont up until this time abandoned the town in favor of Port-Louis, and Hennebont began to turn its activities towards the hinterland.

== Modern period ==
=== Creation and early development of the town ===
The French East India Company (Compagnie française pour le commerce des Indes orientales) was created by Colbert in 1664, to compete with the Dutch East India Company, which had a virtual monopoly on trade to the Indian Ocean. In October 1664, the company set up in the port of Le Havre, but lacked the space to expand, and the anchorage was exposed to English and Dutch aggression. At the end of the same year, the company bought land in Bayonne. Trouble broke out in the town in 1665, as the inhabitants were opposed to the project, and the company had to look for another location. The town of Paimbœuf was considered, but the Governor of Port-Louis, then the King's Lieutenant General in Brittany, used all his influence and Colbert ordered the company's directors to settle in the well-protected harbor of Port-Louis.

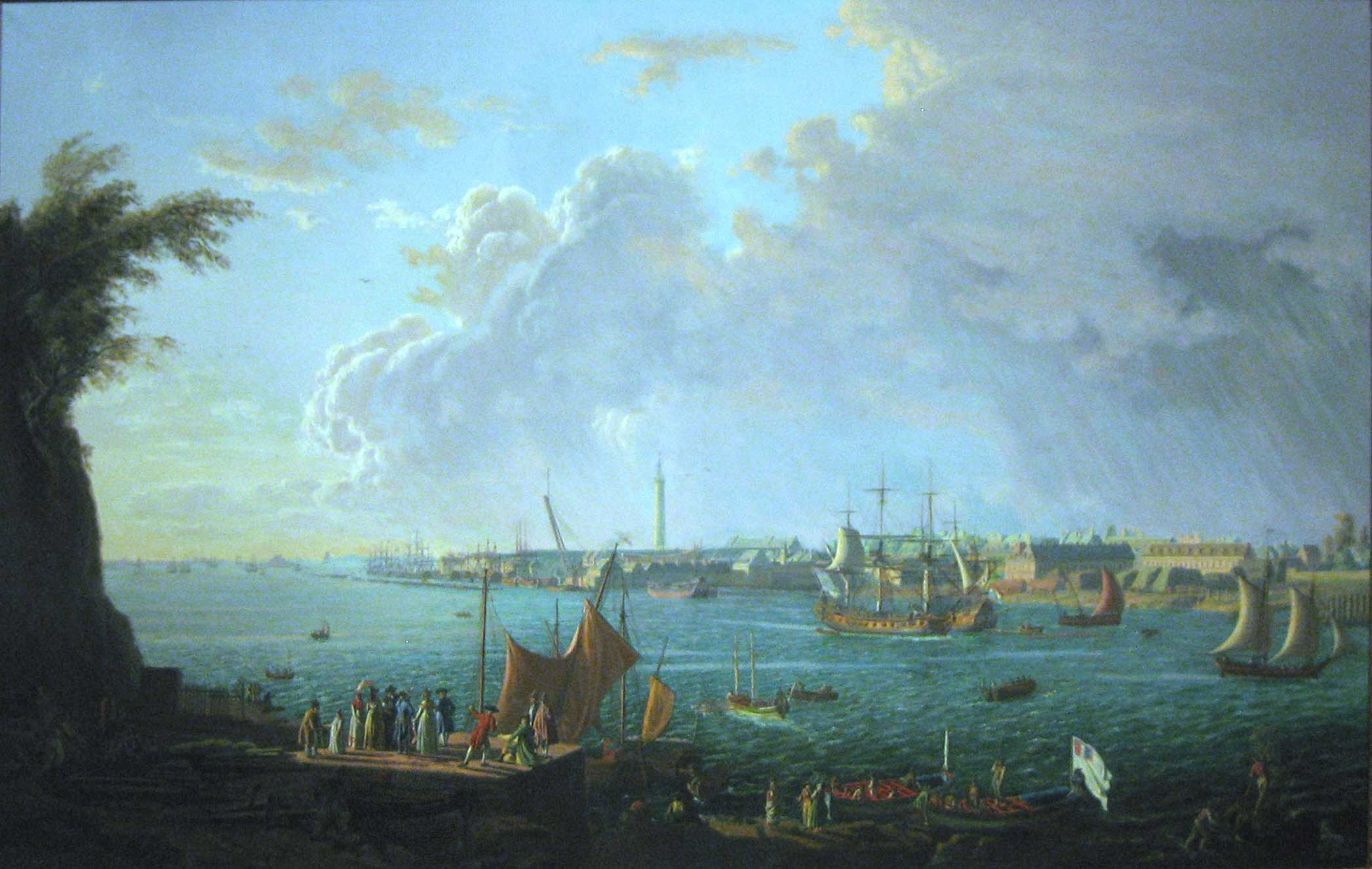
The port of Lorient in the 18th century

In June 1666, Louis XIV issued a decree granting the Compagnie land in Port-Louis, as well as on the other side of the harbor at Le Faouédic. (Note: Literally "little beech wood", this Faouédic moor lies at the confluence of the Blavet and Scorff rivers.) In August 1666, one of the company's directors, Denis Langlois, bought land at the end of the harbor, at the confluence of the Scorff and Blavet rivers, and had slipways built. At first, the site functioned solely as an annex to the Port-Louis facilities, where the company's offices and stores were located. Over the following years, the site was threatened with abandonment several times, but in 1675, in the midst of the Franco Dutch War, the French East India Company decided to abandon its Le Havre base, which was too exposed in wartime, and transfer its infrastructure there. A chapel, workshops, forges and offices were built on the site, which became known as "l'Enclos", and the company left the shores of Port-Louis for good.

The Royal Navy also established itself on the site, under the impetus of Jean-Baptiste Colbert de Seignelay, son of Colbert, who had inherited his father's position as Secretary of State for the Navy. Privateers from Saint-Malo also found refuge here at the same time. Work to adapt the port began in 1687. The yard was requisitioned for the Royal Navy in 1688 when the League of Augsburg war broke out, and the first warships were armed there in 1690. Several ships were also built here, and between 1690 and 1708, eighteen military vessels left the yard. These shipyards attracted between 800 and 900 workers, mainly from Provence, Normandy, the Basque Country and Nantes. The Compagnie des Indes was also forced to cede several structures to the Royale: the general store, the rope works and the sail loft were sold in 1689, as well as part of the living quarters the following year.

The town developed outside the perimeter of the Enclos, in compliance with a 1700 ruling that forced people to leave the area around the Enclos and settle on the Faouédic moor. In 1709, the parish of Lorient was created from that of Plœmeur. By 1702, the town had some 6,000 inhabitants, but the activities of both the East India Company and the Royal Navy remained limited, and the town began to decline.

In 1903, Alfred Trescat superimposed the 1903 and 1703 plans of Lorient.

=== Developments under the Perpetual Company of the East Indies (Compagnie perpétuelle des Indes) ===
==== Commercial boom ====
The town experienced a new boom when John Law de Lauriston created the Compagnie perpétuelle des Indes (Perpetual Company of the East Indies) in 1719 by purchasing several other trading companies, and chose Lorient as his base of operations. The Royal Navy was reluctant to let the new company use the facilities at l'Enclos, but on June 28, 1719, the Conseil de Marine ordered the company to vacate the premises, which it did by the end of the same year.

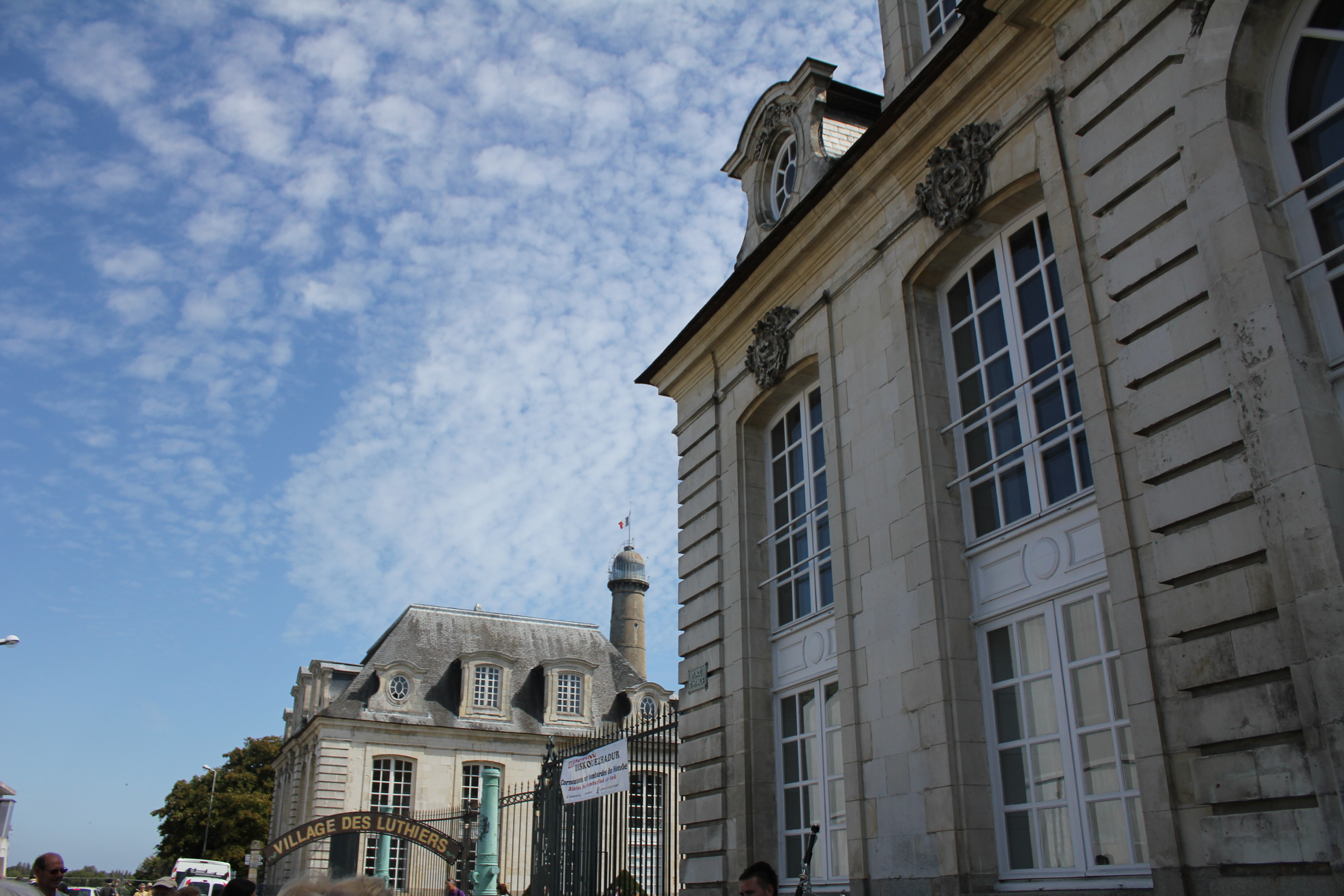
The Gabriel Hotel was built in 1732.

Despite the collapse of the Law system in 1720, the city underwent a new phase of development. On average, 400,000 pounds of pepper, 500,000 pounds of tea, 1.5 to 2 million pounds of coffee, 150,000 pieces of cotton and muslin and 150,000 pieces of Chinese porcelain pass through the city every year. It was during this period that the town took part in the triangular trade, with 156 ships deporting some 43,000 slaves between 1720 and 1790. At a time when the Nantes trade was slowing down and the Compagnie des Indes obtained "the exclusive privilege of trading in Guinea, which includes the slave trade", Lorient established itself as France's leading slave port between 1723 and 1725. In 1732, the Compagnie perpétuelle des Indes decided to transfer the headquarters of all its sales from Nantes to Lorient, and commissioned architect Jean-Charles Gabriel to build new ashlar buildings to accommodate these activities and embellish the Enclos area. From 1734 onwards, sales were held here, and up to twenty-five million livres tournois were transacted. However, the company's monopoly was abolished in 1769 under the influence of the physiocrats.

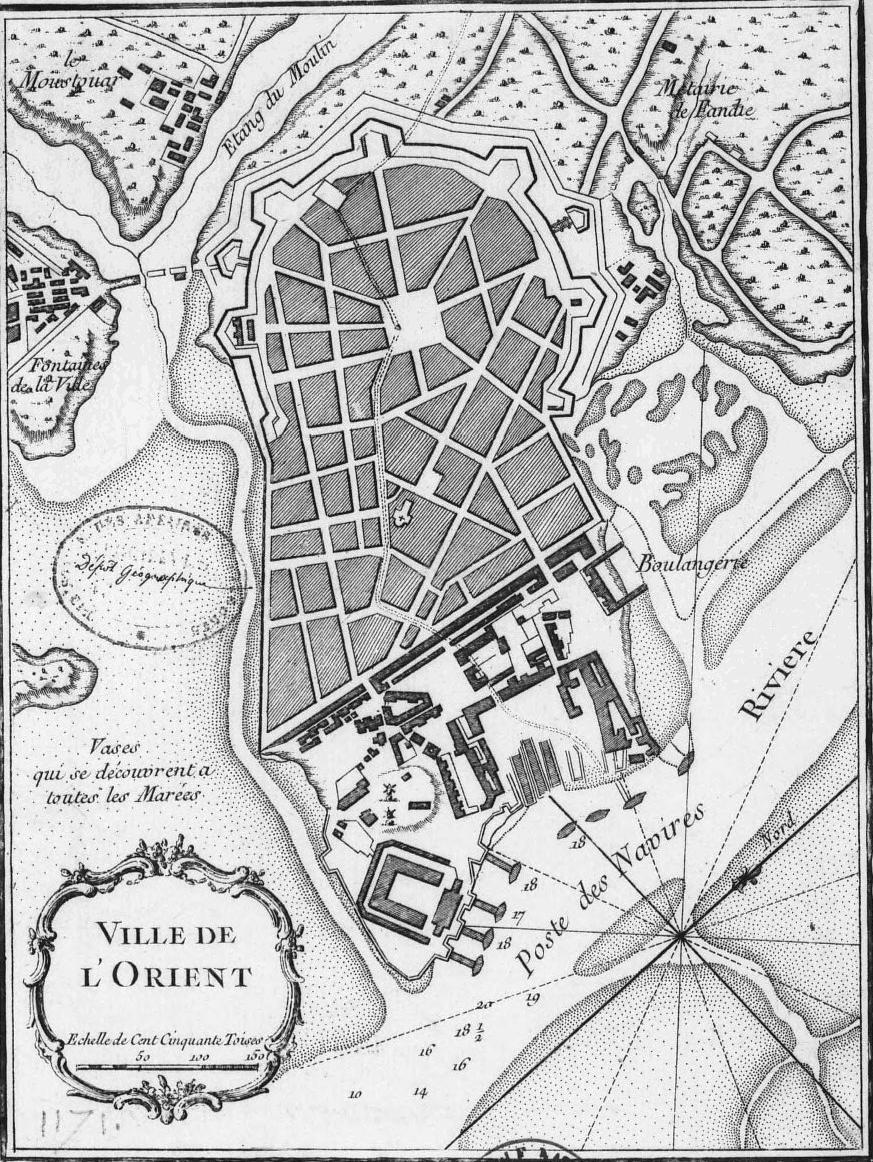
Map of the town and its fortifications in 1764.

Shipbuilding capacity increased with the construction of a new slipway in 1728, and the first 600-ton vessel, the Philibert, was built in 1730. From 1732 onwards, three ships were built each year, enabling the company to renew its entire fleet within twelve years. In 1755, three new slipways were opened at Caudan on the opposite bank of the Scorff.

==== Structure of the town ====
The town benefited from the company's prosperity. In 1738, it had a population of 14,000, rising to 20,000 including the suburbs of Kerentrech, Merville, La Perrière, Calvin and Keryado. Most of the town's population came from Brittany. Of the sailing personnel present, 42.8% came from the parish of Port-Louis and 25.1% from that of Saint-Malo. As for officers, 40% came from the parish of Saint-Malo and 28% from Port-Louis. The remaining 88% of immigrants came from the Breton-speaking departments of Morbihan, Finistère and Côtes-d'Armor, forcing the town to take this linguistic element into account on several occasions. (Note: Yann Lukas gives the example of the 1756 recruitment of Bretonnants to control the city's entrances.)

In 1735, new streets were laid out within the city walls. In 1738, the town acquired the status of "communauté de ville". (Note: This provided the town with a mayor and local administration, and enabled it to send a representative to the Parlement of Rennes. In 1752, a building was purchased to serve as the town hall, and in 1763 the town council gave the streets their first names.) Beautification work began, including street paving, the construction of quays and docks along the banks of the Faouédic stream, and the demolition of thatched cottages to be replaced by houses modelled on the Enclos. Walls were erected in 1744 to close off the town, and were put to the test in September 1746 by a British raid against the town (Siege of Lorient). A municipal hospital, the Hôtel-Dieu, was opened in 1740 thanks to a philanthropist's donation to the town, and as early as 1754 the town and the Compagnie perpétuelle des Indes were planning to build a joint health establishment. In 1766, this was achieved by merging the municipal structure with another of the company's, and in 1771 it was upgraded to a second-class hospital. The disappearance of the Compagnie perpétuelle des Indes in 1769 led to a one-seventh reduction in the town's population.

The town's status as a "communauté de ville", granted in 1738, enabled it to send representatives to the Parlement of Rennes. Between 1738 and 1751, it obtained some 170,000 pounds to modernize its port facilities, as well as a reduction in its capitation tax (per capita tax) between 1746 and 1750 following the British raid on the town. However, the town's administrative and political weight remained below its economic weight, and it depended on other nearby towns such as Hennebont for justice and other matters.

=== End of the ancien régime ===
The American War of Independence brought a surge of activity to the town from 1775 onwards, and several privateers used the town as a home port. From 1778, John Paul Jones used the town and its port as a base for his ship, the Bonhomme Richard, and many of his war catches were repatriated here. In all, 121 catches made on the British by John Paul Jones and others were brought to and sold in Lorient. At the end of the war in 1783, several transatlantic lines were opened from Lorient to the United States.

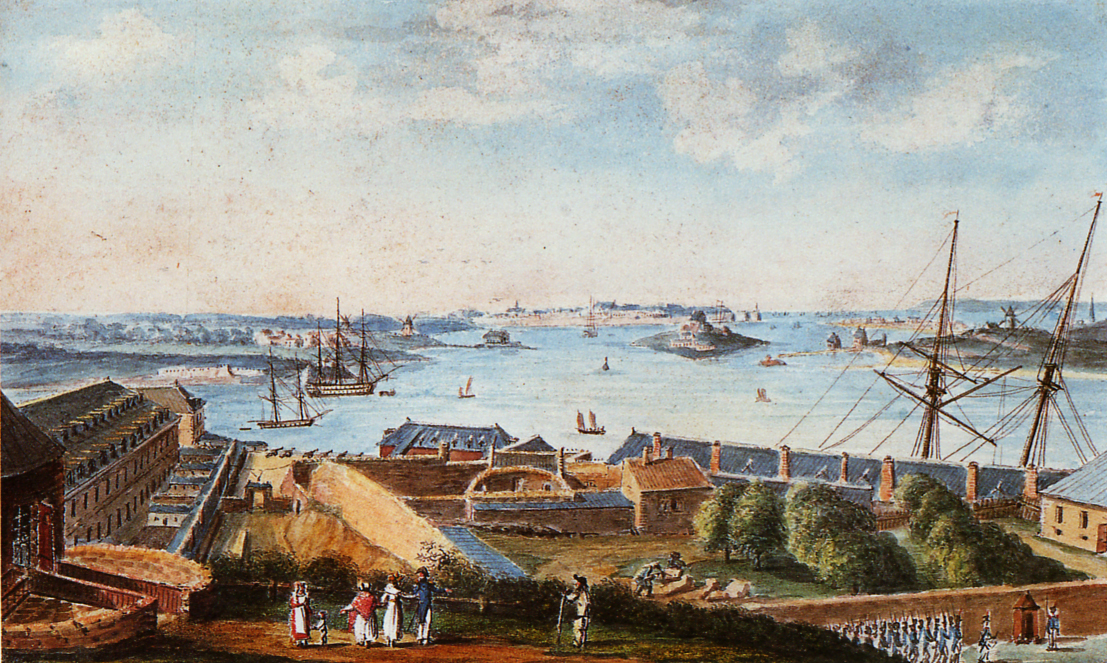
L'Enclos in the late 18th century

The town's conversion began when the king purchased the company's facilities for 17,500,000 tours pound to house his navy. Private shipbuilding expanded, and between 1769 and 1777, the equivalent of 13,000 tons were built. The tonnage built by the Compagnie and then the Royale represented only 39% of total production in Lorient. Private trade developed at the same time, and between 1769 and 1785, when the Calonne Company was founded, Lorient accounted for 57,800 of the 151,955 barrels built in France. In 1785, at the request of Charles Alexandre de Calonne, General Inspector of Finances, a new trading company was created, the East India and China Company, which settled in Lorient.

A bourgeoisie began to emerge, representing 6% of the population at the time of the 1788 capitation. Shipbuilding accounted for 24% and trade for 43.7%. Its development led to the emergence of a cultural life: in 1778, an auditorium with 790 seats was opened. The following year, the town had a permanent theater troupe. The Lorient Masonic Lodge was influential at the time, with 105 members in 1786. It was initially linked to the presence of the Compagnie des Indes. (Note: In 1745, the Grand Master of French Freemasonry was Louis XV's cousin, the Comte de Clermont, who was also director of the Compagnie des Indes.)

== Contemporary age ==
=== Revolution and Empire ===
The French Revolution and the wars against the United Kingdom that followed put an end to commercial activities in Lorient for almost two decades.

The town was one of the few in Morbihan to support the Revolution. The merchant bourgeoisie played an important role in spreading its ideas, and the large presence of construction workers played a part in radicalizing the movement in the town. Thanks to its support for the Revolution, the town acquired the title of county town in 1790, as well as a prison in 1795.

In June 1793, the town council sided with the Girondins against the Montagnards, leading to the arrest of its mayor and the ousting of the town council in favor of elements more sympathetic to the Montagnards. The Terror hit the town in 1793–1794, and thirty people, including fifteen refractory priests, were executed.

A peasant revolt swept through the countryside of the département, but died down at the end of March 1793, only to be revived by the arrival of Chouan general Georges Cadoudal in spring 1794 and the consequences of the Quiberon expedition in summer 1795. The port's commercial activities continued until the British blockade of 1793. From then on, shipbuilding for the Republic took over the town's activities. Between 1793 and 1815, 96 new ships were built and 86 put into service.

The Consulate, then the First Empire, provided the town with new administrative structures. In 1800, Lorient became chief town of the fourth maritime district. A court of first instance was set up the same year. In 1801, the city was granted a Conseil du Commerce, which led to the creation of a Chamber of commerce in 1807.

The town expanded, absorbing the suburb of Kerentrech in 1791 and Merville in 1808.

=== From the Restoration to the Second Empire ===
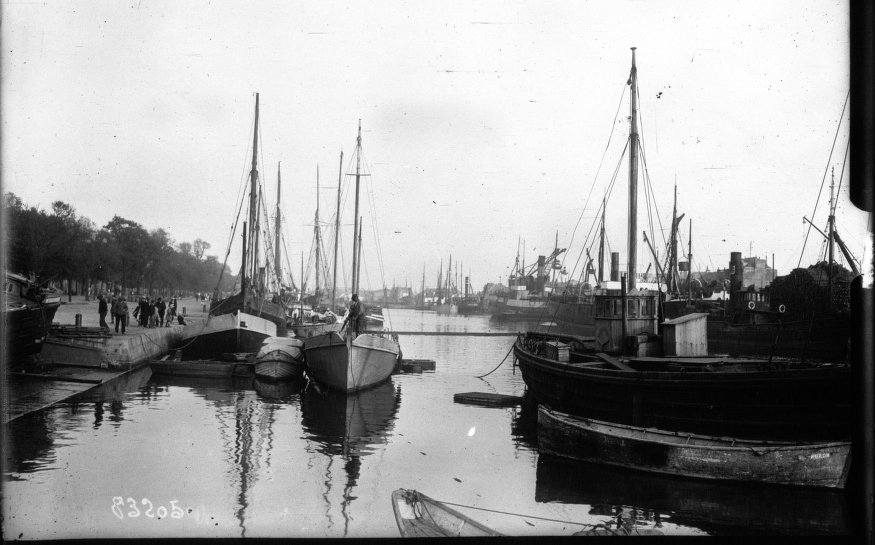
The wet dock, shown here in 1920, was built between 1839 and 1848.

The town's maritime activities declined at the beginning of the 19th century, and both the arsenal and the naval port operated at low capacity for a period that lasted until the Restoration and the July Monarchy. Lorient then turned to administrative activities: a lazaretto was created in 1823 on Saint-Michel Island, and a barracks in 1839. However, the town remained dependent on naval activities until the turn of the 1860s and 1880s. The Chamber of Commerce tried unsuccessfully on several occasions to obtain government funding for a transatlantic trading port to diversify the town's activities. A wet dock and outer harbor were built between 1839 and 1848. By 1860, however, Lorient was only France's 26th-largest commercial port, and the town began to focus on agricultural trade.

The city's morphology changed. The inner city was completely built out in 1833, and the extension to the west of Le Faouëdic was decided between 1857 and 1861. The Nouvelle-Ville district was built in 1873, doubling the city's surface area.

In 1822, the town was given a secondary school, foreshadowing a college and later a high school. Courses were offered to prepare students for the competitive examination for the École navale, and its principal, Louis-Antoine Dufilhol, soon added preparatory courses for the competitive examination for the Polytechnic School. By 1853, the college had 350 students preparing for the Polytechnique, Navale, Saint-Cyr and the École normale supérieure. Between 1840 and 1860, the college trained 187 students for Saint-Cyr, 314 for Navale and future polytechnicians such as Guieysse and Dupuy de Lôme. A maritime engineering school was also created in 1827, with applications at the arsenal.

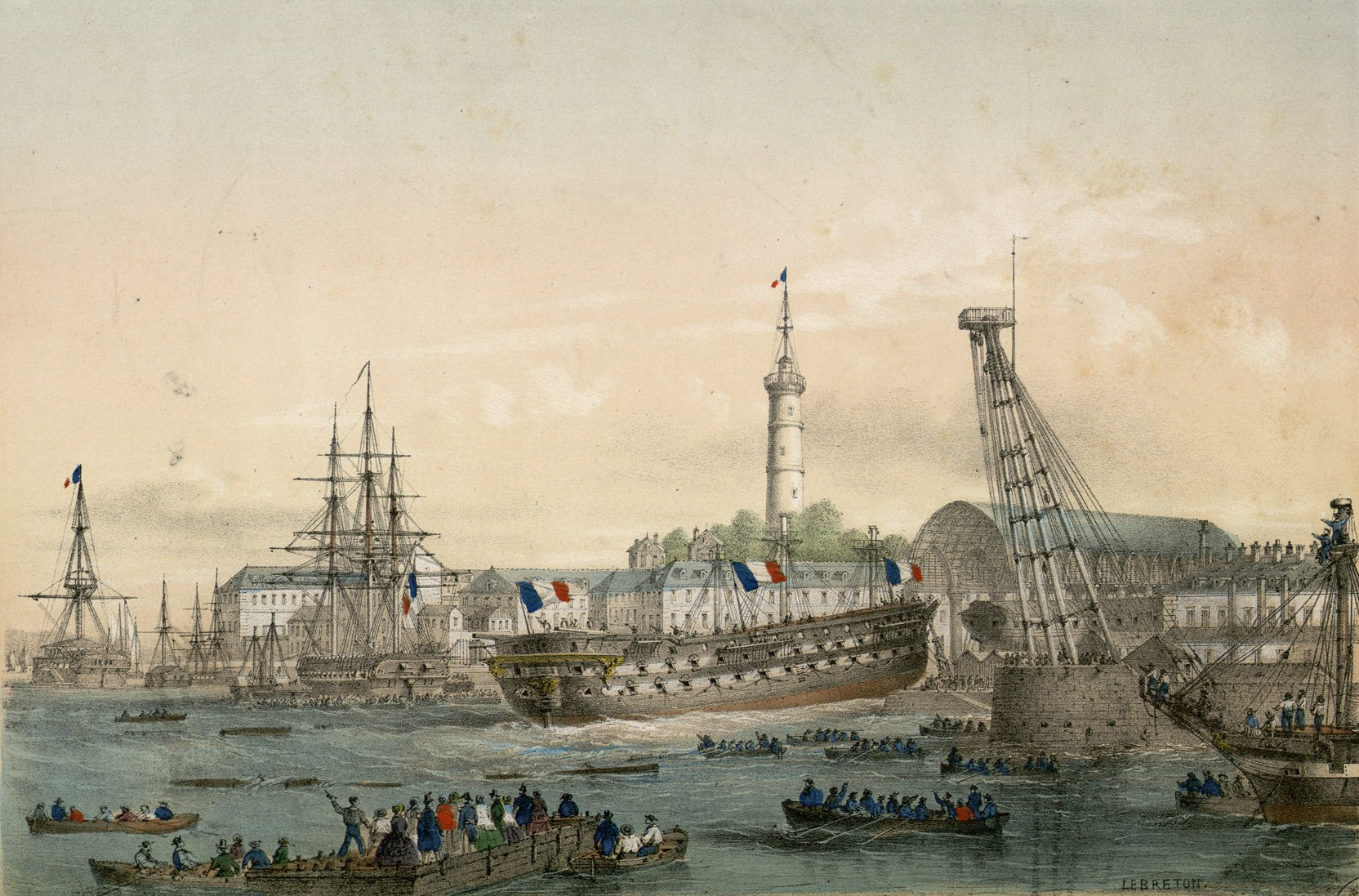
The Enclos area in the 1860s

The town modernized in the second quarter of the nineteenth century: the arsenal began its renovation with the opening of a first covered slipway and a first dry dock in 1825, a sardine canning factory using the Appert method opened in 1825, and a gasworks opened in 1845. The arrival of the steam engine in the second half of the 19th century enabled the ports to revive their activities. The first locomotive crossed the Scorff in 1865 on a viaduct built for the arrival of the railway. The first dry dock was enlarged and a second opened in 1861. The same year, the battleship La Couronne left the arsenal, followed in 1876 and 1879 by the battleships La Dévastation and Le Redoutable, the town having already built the navy's first two paddle steamers: L'Africain in 1818 and Le Voyageur in 1819.

Socially, the town remained predominantly working-class. In 1839, the town had just 840 census voters, and in 1848, the arsenal accounted for 60% of the electorate. In the presidential elections of 1848, Cavaignac won 66% of the vote, Ledru-Rollin 23% and Bonaparte 12%, (Note: In Morbihan, the scores were 37.7% for Bonaparte, 60% for Cavaignac, and 2.3% for Ledru-Rollin.) but this did not prevent the town from voting for Bonaparte in the plebiscite of 1851, approving the establishment of the Second Empire the following year, and voting 73% for him in the plebiscite of May 8, 1870.

=== The town under the Third Republic ===
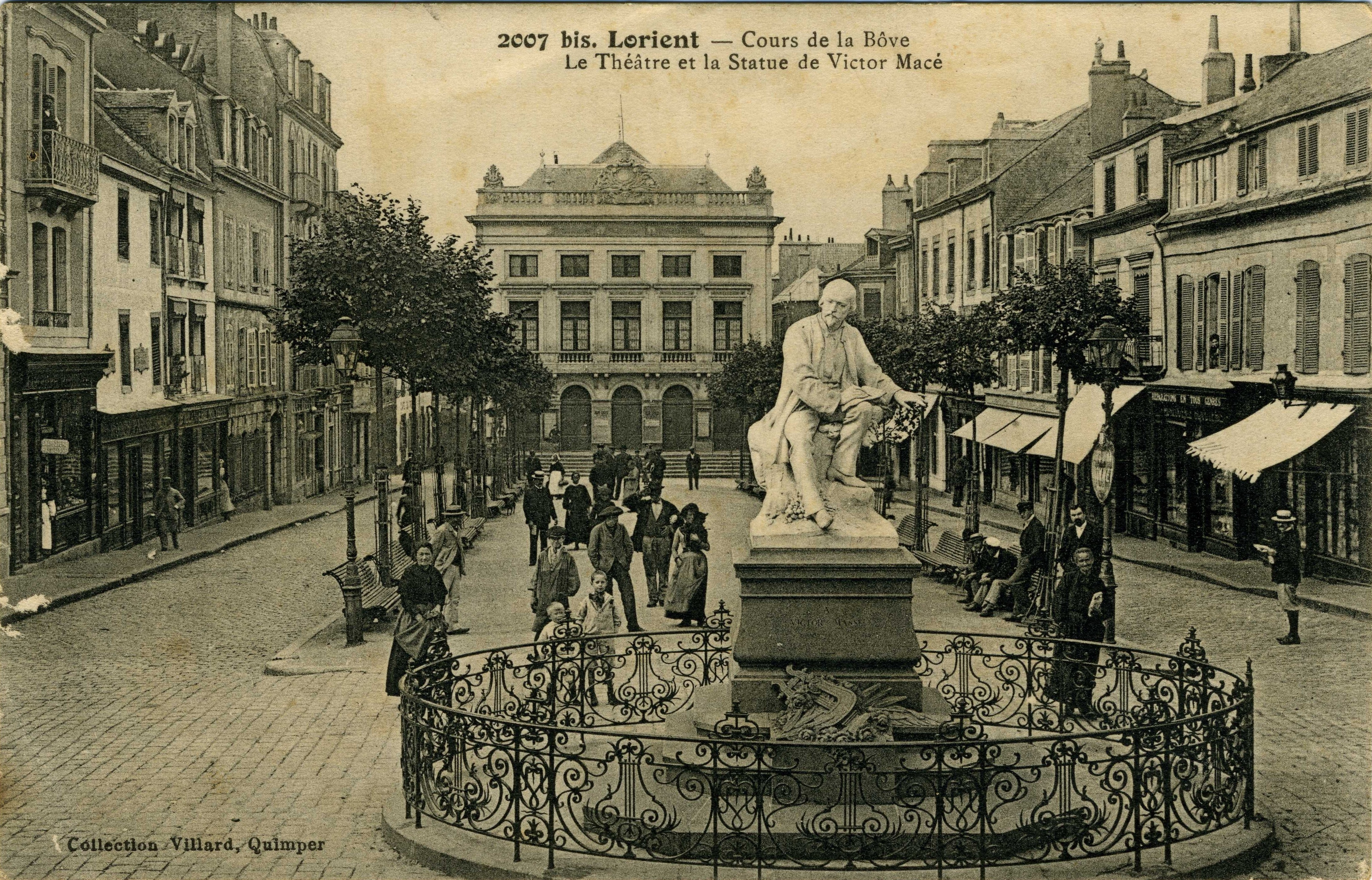
The course of the Bôve in 1907

The city's morphology was again changing at this time. The fortifications were gradually demolished: the ramparts were demolished in 1906, and the following year the Morbihan and Plœmeur gates, built in 1745, were also demolished. Transport was developed, with the introduction of a tramway and a sea link with Groix in 1901, followed by the construction of the Bonhomme bridge between Caudan and Kervignac in 1904 and the Kermelo bridge in 1913. A sub-prefecture and a commercial court were built in 1901, followed in 1902 by a village hall, in 1906 by the Bodelio hospital, in 1924 by the sports park and in 1935 by a bus station.

Politically, unlike the rest of the department, the town was governed by left-wing mayors during this period, and experienced opposition between Radical-Socialists and socialists. The mayors were anti-clerical, which led to the banning of religious processions in 1898. The policy of radical Émile Combes, who banned the use of Breton in sermons, led to the development of a Breton movement in the town. The 1930s were more difficult, with the effects of the economic crisis hitting the town hard. The number of unemployed rose from 927 in 1929 to 1,952 in 1930. The political climate became tense, and opposition between the town's left-wing circles and the Croix-de-Feu, led at the time by a native of the town, François de La Rocque, led to violent demonstrations in 1934 and 1936.

Lorient's arsenal and harbor were modernized, and the town once again became a military port. In 1889, the workshops switched from cast iron to cast steel, an electric plant was built in 1894 and an electric forge the following year. In 1900, the works undertaken made the harbor navigable for the largest battleships of the era, such as the Mirabeau, launched in 1908. A 150-t Titan crane was added to the port in 1912, and a third basin was dug between 1919 and 1922.

The town developed a commercial activity with Wales, from where coal was imported for the town's steam engines and to which maritime pine wood was exported for shoring Welsh mines, enabling the town to balance its trade. This trade collapsed towards the end of the 1920s, (Note: 28,756 tons of wooden poles were exported in 1918, compared with 17,148 in 1930 and 4,245 in 1931.) and the town had to turn to sardine exports.

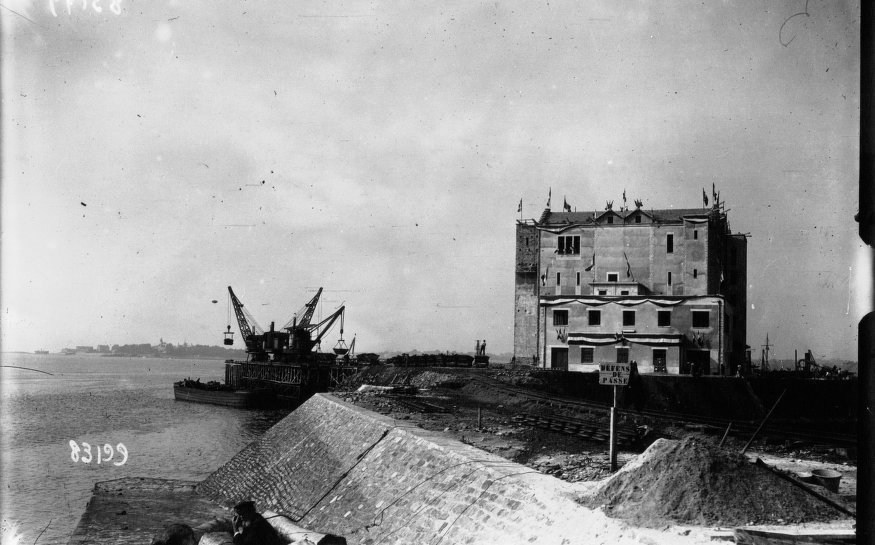
Keroman under construction in 1920

Fishing began to develop with the creation of the municipal fish market in 1889, linked to the railroads in 1906, and the arrival of the first steam trawler in 1900. By 1909, traffic in Lorient equaled that of the three ports of Douarnenez, Pont-l'Abbé and Concarneau combined, but development came to a halt during the First World War, when trawlers were requisitioned by the army. A project by engineer Henri Verrière obtained over thirty million francs in state funding, and work was carried out from 1919 to 1927. It included the development of the Keroman cove, with 1,530 m of quays, a 7.90-hectare stretch of water and several buildings, including a refrigeration plant. These works enabled a 50% increase in the volume of fish caught between 1926 and 1939, but the canneries were hit by the crisis and had difficulty selling their production.

=== The First World War ===
Le Grondin, a fishing trawler from Lorient, was attacked on April 8, 1917, by a German submarine, which, armed, managed to sink it. On August 9, 1917, the same trawler saved the 37-man crew of the torpedoed Portuguese steamer Berlinga; then on August 26, 1917, 13 of the 60-man crew of the large cunarder Volodia; on November 29, 1917, it rescued 21 shipwrecked crew from the Jeanne Conseil and 3 from the sailing ship Notre-Dame-de-Rostrenen; finally, on January 8, 1918, it saved 24 crew from the steamer Voltaire II.

Several trawlers from Lorient fell victim to mines (Providence, Saint-Corentin, Stella, La Tanche); the Eider sank following a collision.

=== The Second World War ===
==== The city in the war ====
The Phoney War period in Lorient was marked by the city's disorganization. Numerous civil servants were sent to the front, and means of transport and trawlers were confiscated by the army, while the first official restrictions were imposed in January 1940. The city's maritime prefect was in charge of coastal defense and maritime traffic in the fifth region, stretching from the Pointe de la Torche to the Spanish border. Lorient was used as a fallback base in the face of the German advance in June 1940. The gold of the Belgian and Polish national banks was evacuated through its port on June 17 and 18, 1940. On the same day, Admiral Darlan, who had retreated to Bordeaux, ordered local forces to resist the German advance. On June 19, the trawler La Tanche exploded on a sea mine as it tried to flee the town with the last refugees, killing over 200 people. Vice-Admiral Penfentenyo, in charge of the city's defense, applied a scorched-earth policy: oil tanks in the city's ports were set on fire, ammunition was drowned in the harbor, and the gates of the arsenal's dry docks were dynamited. On June 21, 1940, German troops regrouped in Quimperlé and attacked Guidel. Lorient fell the same day.

The losses caused to Allied convoys by Dönitz's "gray wolves" during the Battle of the Atlantic forced them to react. An American raid was launched on the base on October 12, 1942, to test the strength of the bunkers, but the damage inflicted was minimal. On January 14, 1943, Churchill ordered the destruction of the towns surrounding the bases, to limit their supply. Lorient was designated as the priority target, and between January 14 and February 17, 1943, over 4,000 tons of bombs were dropped on the town. Only the Keroman bases remained intact, while in the town where the evacuation order had been issued on February 3, 3,500 buildings were destroyed, with 230 deaths.

The French Resistance also developed on and around the construction site. In December 1940, geological surveys were faked to slow down construction. Plans for the base were sent to London in December 1941 by Alphonse Tanguy, an arsenal engineer. The arsenal's deputy director, Jacques Stosskopf, informed the Allies of the U-boats' movements. Within the arsenal, eighteen actions were officially recorded between December 1940 and January 1944. From July 1943 onwards, sabotage in and around the town increased, as did acts of passive resistance such as demonstrations.

==== The Keroman submarine base ====
At the beginning of June 1940, Vice-Admiral Karl Dönitz sent officers from his staff to inspect ports along the French coast that could serve as bases for his submarines, and he arrived in Lorient on June 23, 1940. He decided to establish his headquarters and the 2nd U-boat Flotilla there on June 28, 1940, and moved into a villa in the Kernével district of Larmor-Plage, opposite the Keroman peninsula, on October 16, 1940. German workers from the Wilhelmshaven base set off for the town at the end of June, carrying out repairs on site from August 2. The harbor was inspected for magnetic mines and declared open on July 6. The first U-boat, the U-30, arrives for refuelling the following day. Work begins on refurbishing port infrastructures, and some, such as the slipway in the fishing port, are reinforced to allow submarines to use them.

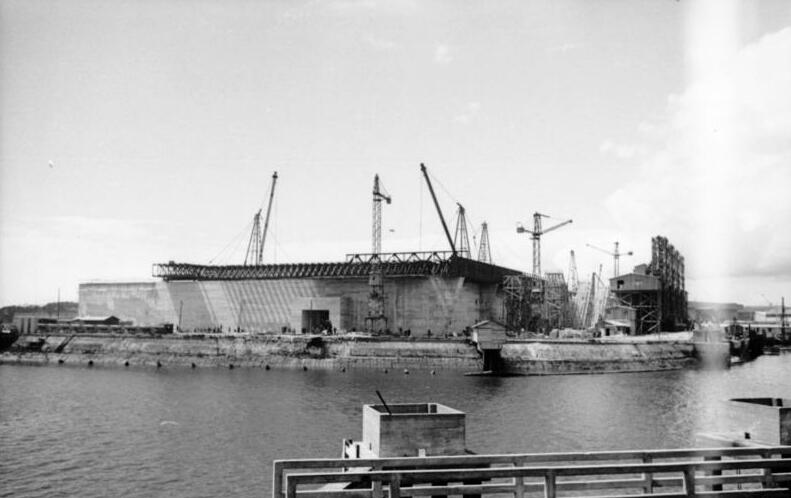
The Lorient Submarine Base under construction in 1942

The Keroman peninsula is chosen as the site for a U-boat base. The project was structured around a slipway, with the submarines kept dry in the cells. The project was accepted by Hitler, and work began in January 1941. Work began in January 1940, and in May 1941 two Dom-Bunkers (Note: The name "Dom-Bunkers" comes from their shape. Some authors also refer to them as "Cathedral Bunkers".) were inaugurated around the slipway in the fishing port. Construction of the Keroman I base began in February 1941, and Keroman II three months later, in May. Keroman I was inaugurated on September 1, 1941, and Keroman II in December of the same year. In Lanester, a shelter bunker for two U-boats was built from November 1940 and inaugurated on October 1, 1941. Nearly a million cubic meters of concrete were used to build the fortress, representing almost a quarter of the concrete used in France for the German military effort, as well as 40,000 m3 of formwork wood.

==== The Lorient pocket and the liberation ====
Brittany began to be liberated by the Allies in August 1944, and the city of Brest surrendered in mid-September. The human cost for the Allies was high, with over 10,000 soldiers wounded or killed. The cities of Lorient and Saint-Nazaire no longer had the same strategic priority, and the US Army counted only 32 deaths there until the end of the conflict. The first G.I.s arrived north of the city's defences on August 7. The day before, the Royal Air Force had unsuccessfully attempted to destroy the roof of one of Keroman's bunkers by dropping a six-ton bomb. In the pocket, some 25,000 soldiers organized their defense. The Keroman bunkers were converted into accommodation, and the Lann-Bihoué naval aeronautical base continued to liaise with Germany until August 8, 1944. The Lorient pocket held out against attack for nine months, before surrendering on May 10, 1945.

=== Reconstruction ===
90% of the city's buildings were destroyed when the city was returned to France: (4,095 buildings were destroyed in Lorient and Keryado, with a further 3,245 in urgent need of repair. The delayed date of its liberation prevented it from benefiting from the first funds released by the Ministry of Reconstruction and Urban Planning, and the municipality had to introduce a system of residence permits to limit the number of inhabitants. In the winter of 1945, there were 8,000 inhabitants and 6,500 workers engaged in reconstruction, most of them living in temporary dwellings. In 1946, there were 436 barracks spread over eleven settlements; in 1947, the number of settlements was increased to 29, and in 1948, this number was further increased. By 1961, there were still 856 wooden dwellings on the outskirts of the town and a further 1,062 outside the city limits.

The details of the reconstruction were discussed between the municipality and local residents, as well as with the town-planning architect Georges Tourry. It was decided to preserve pre-existing commercial trends, while remodeling street widths, the location of certain buildings and building heights. The plan was approved by the municipality on January 13, 1946, and on March 7, 1946, the issue of land consolidation was raised. This continued until 1947, when the national urban planning committee accepted the reconstruction plan on December 19, 1946. The city had to cope with the difficulties of financing reconstruction: war damage reimbursements only covered the value of the property, not the cost of rebuilding it, and the city obtained only 70% of the necessary sum.

The 1,700,000 m3 of rubble were used to fill in the Kergroise cove, providing the town with a deep-water port, as well as part of the wet dock to provide a public space for the population. A series of buildings were constructed from the 1950s onwards: the "Le Royal" (Note: Currently used by a Fnac store.) cinema opened in 1951, followed by the Merville school in 1952 and the Bisson school in 1954, while the Lycée Dupuy-de-Lôme opened the previous year. The Parc des Sports opened in 1958, the same year as the Pont d'Oradour, and the Hôtel de Ville in 1960, followed by the Halles de Merville in 1964.

=== The city under the Fifth Republic ===
==== Development and crisis ====
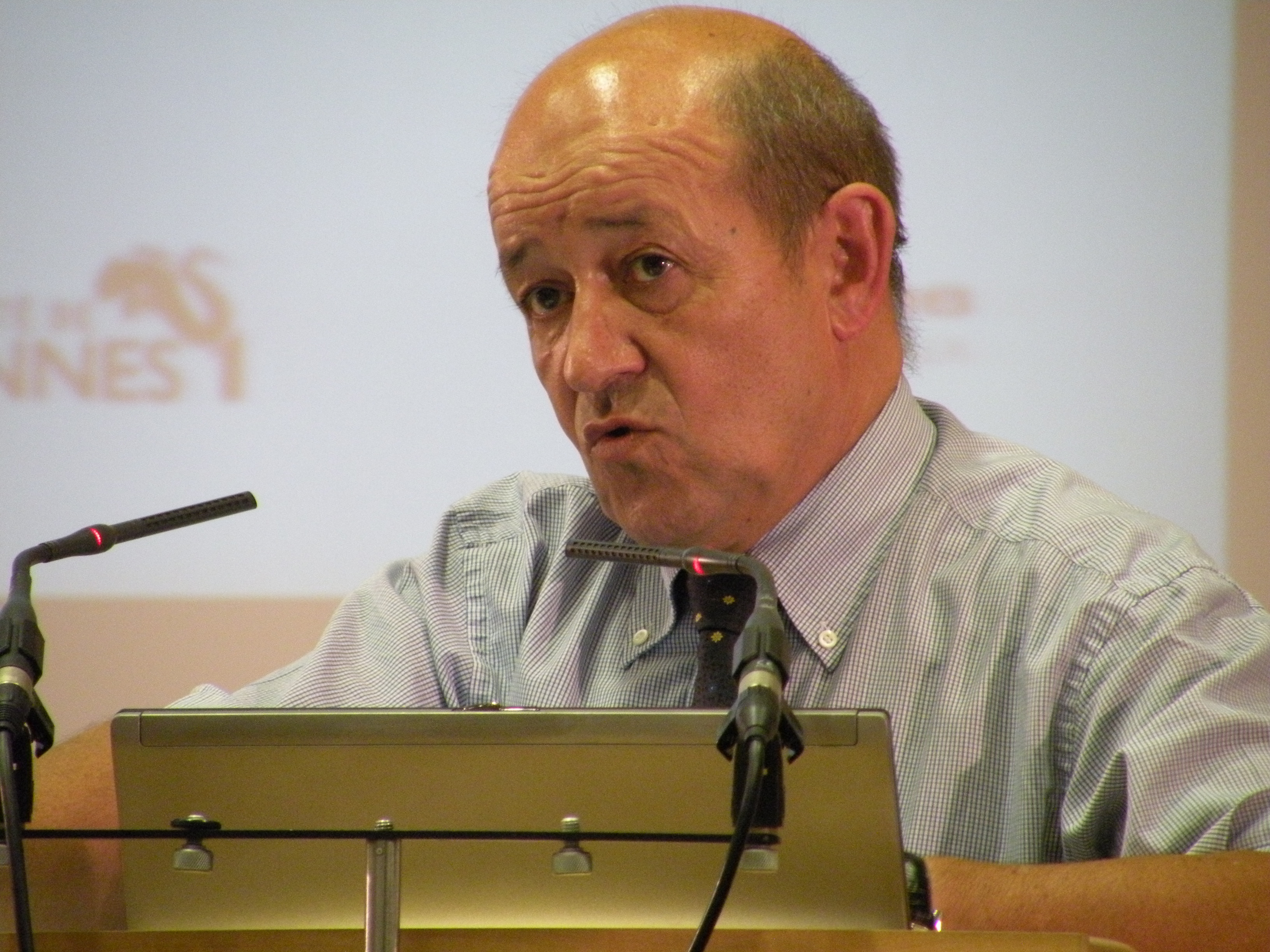
Jean-Yves Le Drian, mayor from 1981 to 1998, helped set up the Lorient conurbation.

In the 1960s, the city expanded with the construction of new neighborhoods. The Kerguillette, Kervenanec and Bois-du-Château low-income housing estates began construction in 1966, and were completed in 1971. In 1962, the municipal council voted in favor of joining forces with the neighboring commune of Larmor-Plage, but this failed in 1965. At the same time, an administration was being set up to link the communes bordering the town. The "syndicat intercommunal à vocation multiple (SIVOM)" was created in 1974. It brought together Caudan, Lanester, Lorient, Larmor-Plage, Plœmeur and Quéven. In 1990, it was replaced by the "District du pays de Lorient", and in the following decade eleven new communes joined. A new agglomeration community took over in 2000, under the name of Cap l'Orient.

Lorient remained politically left-wing, with the Socialist Party providing most of its mayors, with two exceptions: the Communist Charles Le Samedy led the city from 1951 to 1953, after outvoting the previous mayor, Julien Le Pan, on the council and provoking an early election; and Louis Glotin, the only right-wing mayor in the city's history, was in power from 1959 to 1965, taking advantage of a split in the left-wing at the time. Presidential elections produced different results, with de Gaulle taking 66.56% of the vote in 1965, Pompidou winning the most votes in 1969, and Giscard d'Estaing in 1974.

In the 1970s, roads linking the city to other Breton towns were developed. The Breton road plan led to the construction of Route Nationale 165 to Nantes and Brest, and Route Nationale 24 to Ploermel and Rennes. The Lann-Bihoué air base opened its first link to Paris in 1961. In 1991, Lorient station welcomed its first TGV trains.

Port activities continued to expand. The commercial port of Kergroise was upgraded to accommodate larger vessels, and enlarged, enabling commercial traffic to increase by 90.9% between 1965 and 1975. 365 million francs were invested between 1968 and 1983 to increase the quay length to 1,000 m. The Keroman fishing port saw its fleet gradually modernized: the first steel trawler was purchased from a Saint-Malo shipyard in 1958, in 1962 the town received a stern trawler for the first time in France, a conveyor-belt landing line was opened in 1956, a new fish market was opened in 1975, and 190 m of quay were added between 1975 and 1976. Yachting began to develop: in 1975, the Club Nautique de Lorient brought together some one hundred and fifteen boats in the old outer harbor, and in 1986 a Maison de la Mer was opened alongside it. The Lorient Submarine Base was reused by the French Navy until February 11, 1997, when it was returned to civilian use. The city then entered a period of crisis, caused by the slowdown in activity at the Keroman fishing port and the closure of the submarine base.

==== Recent conversions ====
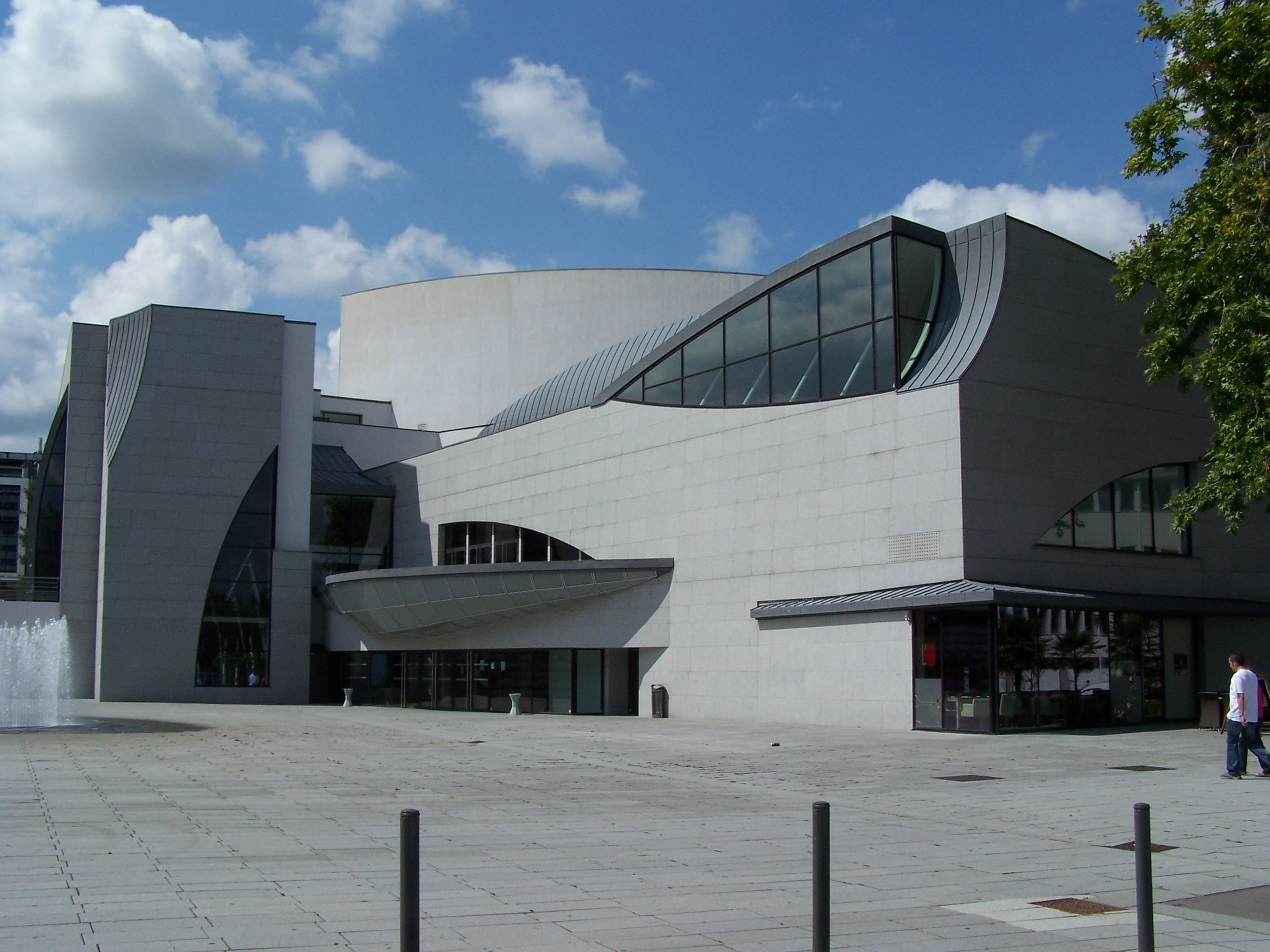
The Grand Théâtre, inaugurated in 2003

The town received funding from the European Economic Community to support industrial conversion and military restructuring in the 1980s and 1990s. More jobs were created than lost between 1980 and 1995.

The Quai de Rohan area was redesigned by architect Roland Castro in the late 1990s. The Enclos du Port site, reclaimed by the municipality after the departure of the French Navy, also underwent a redevelopment project in the late 2000s.

The town has added new facilities, such as a new municipal library in the Orientis area, opened in 1992, and a large theater inaugurated in 2003 near the town hall. In 2007, the Cité de la voile Éric Tabarly and an ocean racing center were built on the former site of the submarine base. An image center has also been created in the Enclos du Port, which since September 2000 has been home to the TV Breizh channel, serving as a nucleus of development for a wider sector of activity by attracting other companies of the same type: four of the sixteen audiovisual production companies present in Brittany in 2000 are now based in Lorient.

The city's influence grew thanks to a number of events. The University of Southern Brittany opened in 1995, following the establishment of the first IUT in 1975. In 1998, Football Club Lorient-Bretagne Sud entered First Ligue for the first time, and remained there from the second half of the 2000s. The Lorient Interceltic Festival grew in stature and became one of France's biggest festivals in the 1990s.

== See also ==
- French Est India Company
- Raid on Lorient

== Bibliography ==
- Louis Chaumeil (1939). "Abrégé d'histoire de Lorient de la fondation (1666) à nos jours (1939)". Annales de Bretagne. 46: 66–87. doi:10.3406/abpo.1939.1788.
- Claude Nières (1988). Histoire de Lorient (in French). Toulouse: Privat. ISBN 978-2-7089-8268-0. LCCN 89121626.
- Yann Lukas (1997). Lorient: Histoire d'une ville (in French). Quimper: Palantines. ISBN 978-2-911434-02-0. LCCN 2001348498.
- François Jégou (1870). Histoire de la fondation de Lorient: Étude archéologique (in French). Lorient: Ad. Lesnard, imprimeur-libraire.
- H.-F. Buffet (1937). "Lorient sous Louis XIV". Annales de Bretagne. 44 (1–2): 58–99. doi:10.3406/abpo.1937.1757.
- J.-L. Debauve (1977). "Un Américain en Bretagne: séjours dans L'Ouest de John Paul Jones (1778–1780". Annales de Bretagne et des pays de l'Ouest. 84 (3): 203–221.
- Philippe Haudrère, "La Compagnie des Indes en Bretagne", ArMen, Quimper, Éditions Fitamant, n^{o} 201, July–August 2014, p. 18–25 (ISSN 0297-8644)
- Louis Bourget-Maurice; Josyane Grand Colas (1997). Et la tanière devient village: La base de sous-marins de Lorient-Kéroman (1940-1997). Éditions du Quantième. ISBN 978-2-9511948-1-6.
- Luc Braeuer (2008). La base de sous-marins de Lorient. Le Pouliguen: Liv'Édition. ISBN 978-2-9525651-2-7.
- Christophe Cérino; Yann Lukas (2003). Keroman: base de sous-marin, 1940-2003. Plomelin: Éditions Palantines. ISBN 978-2-911434-34-1.
- Nicole Bruté de Rémur, "La reconstruction de Lorient", Norois, vol. 26, n^{o} 26, 1960, p. 147–160
- François Frey (1987). 60e anniversaire du port de pêche de Lorient-Kéroman: 1927-1987 (in French). Lorient: Chambre de commerce et d'industrie du Morbihan. ISBN 978-2-900770-04-7. LCCN 90202546.
- Frederico J. Martinez-Roda, "L'ensemble portuaire de Lorient", Norois, n^{o} 119, July–September 1983, p. 407–420
- Alain Cabon (2010). Festival interceltique de Lorient (in French). Rennes: Éditions Ouest-France. ISBN 978-2-7373-5223-2.
- Florence Gourlay (2004). Lorient: Une ville dans la mondialisation (in French). Rennes: Presses universitaires de Rennes. ISBN 978-2-86847-968-6.
