= French West =

French West can refer to:

- French West Africa
- French Western Australia
- French West Indies
- French American West, i.e. the Louisiana (New France) (French West in the North America)

== See also ==
- Western France
- West Francia
