= Notre-Dame-de-Victoire, Lorient =

Church located in Lorient, France

Church of Our Lady of Victory
- Église Notre-Dame-de-Victoire
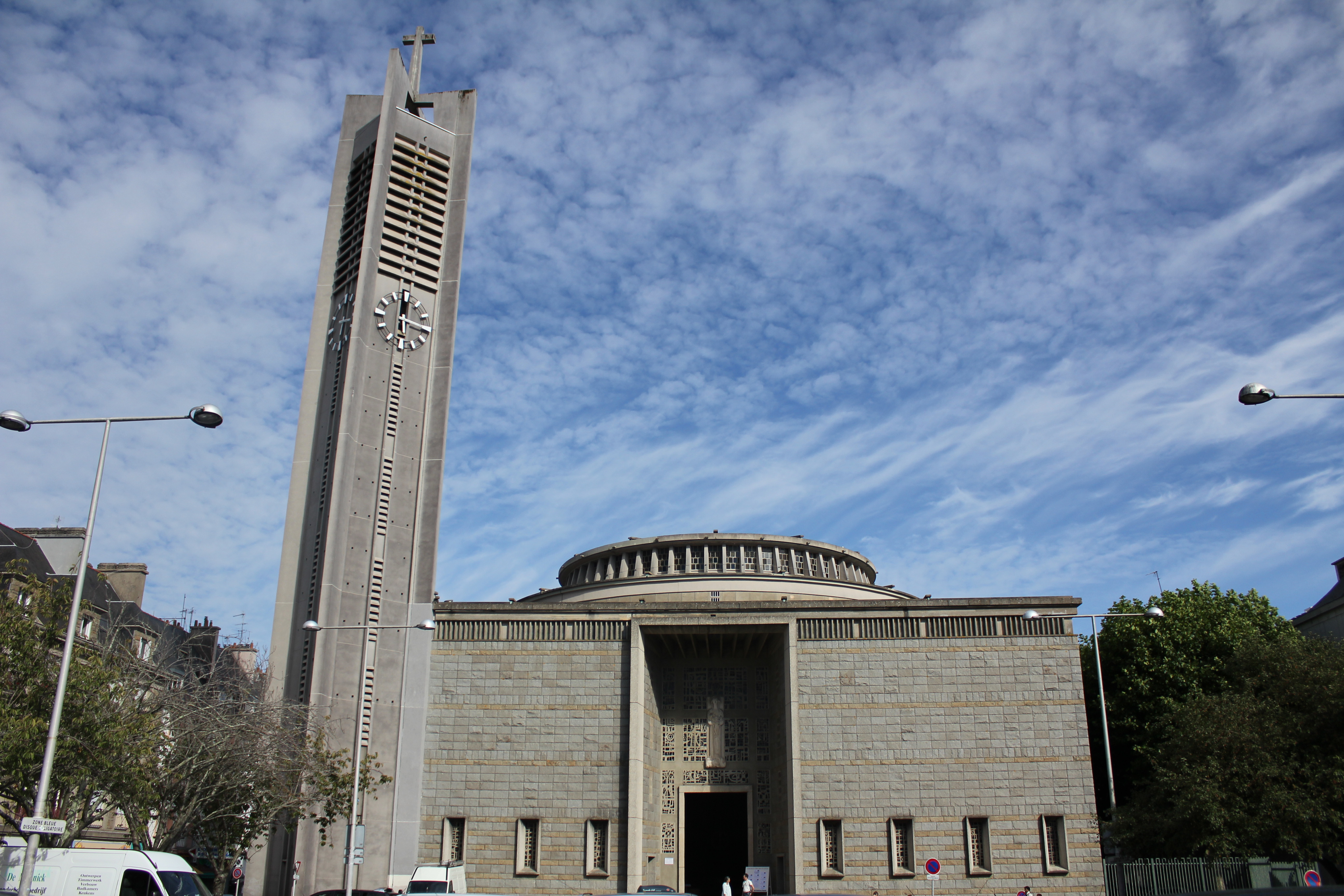

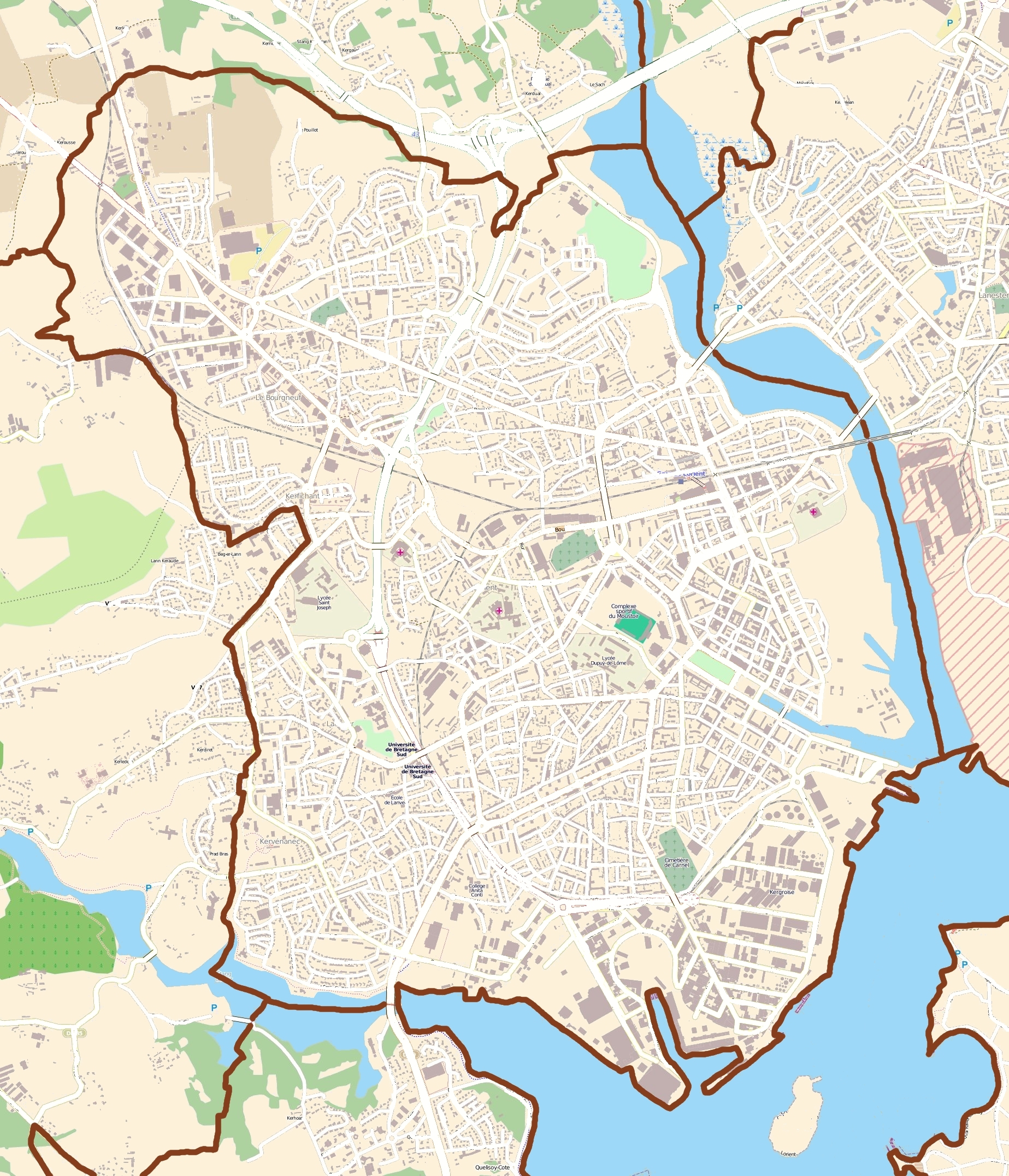
- Location within Lorient

Religion
- Affiliation: Roman Catholic
- Region: Brittany
- Status: Parish church

Location
- Municipality: Lorient
- Country: France
- Interactive map of Church of Our Lady of Victory
- Coordinates: building 47°44′58″N 3°21′39″W

Architecture
- Architect: Jean-Baptiste Hourlier
- Completed: 1955
- Height (max): 54 m (belltower)

The Church of Our Lady of Victory (French: Église Notre-Dame-de-Victoire) is a Catholic parish church in central Lorient, France. It is the most important parish in the Lorient Country.

== History ==
The building was completed in 1955, after the 1943 bombings that destroyed the 1810 Church of Saint Louis. The name of the church (Our Lady of Victory) refers to the 1746 British raid on Lorient.

The church was initially designed in 1953 by Jean-Baptiste Hourlier, who had won the 1926 Grand Prix de Rome and served as the deputy chief architect of the reconstruction of Lorient between 1946 and 1952. The church was labelled an official "20th-century heritage" building (Patrimoine du XXe siècle).

== Architecture ==
The 54-meter-high concrete bell tower is the highest point of Lorient. Its top is reached by a staircase of 270 steps.

Inside the apse, a fresco made by Nicolas Untersteller shows the Coronation of Mary.

The statues of the church were made by René Letourneur.
