= Lorient =

Subprefecture and commune in Brittany, France

Lorient An Oriant (Breton)
- Subprefecture and commune
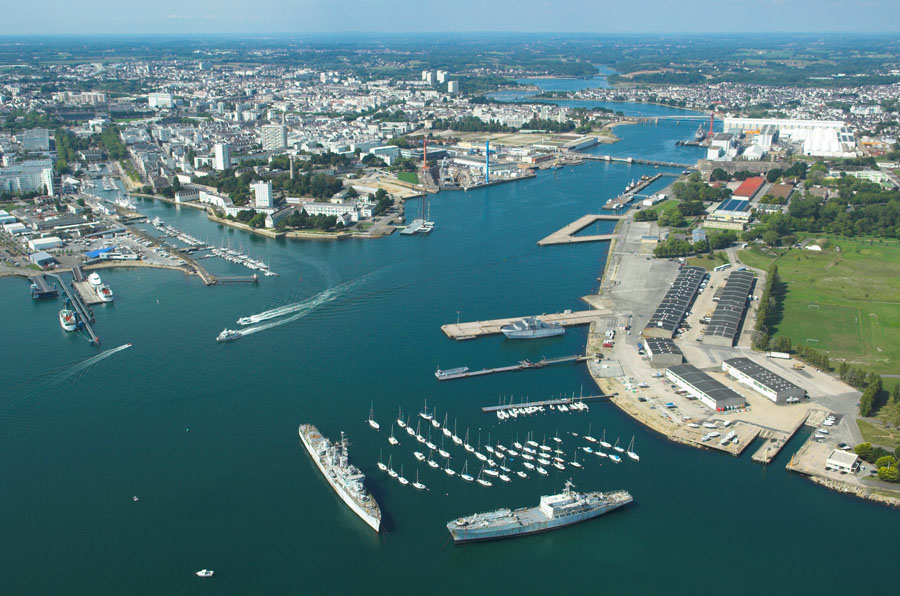
- Aerial view of the harbour of Lorient

- Flag Coat of arms
- Location of Lorient
- Location within France Location within Brittany
- Coordinates: 47°45′N 3°22′W
- Country: France
- Region: Brittany
- Department: Morbihan
- Arrondissement: Lorient
- Canton: Lorient-1 and 2
- Intercommunality: Lorient Agglomération

Government
  - Mayor (2026–32): Fabrice Loher
- Area^{1}: 17.48 km^{2} (6.75 sq mi)
- Highest elevation: 46 m (151 ft)
- Lowest elevation: 0 m (0 ft)
- Population (2023): 58,329
  - Density: 3,337/km^{2} (8,643/sq mi)
- Time zone: UTC+01:00 (CET)
  - Summer (DST): UTC+02:00 (CEST)
- INSEE/Postal code: 56121 /56100
- ^{1} French Land Register data, which excludes lakes, ponds, glaciers > 1 km^{2} (0.386 sq mi or 247 acres) and river estuaries.

Lorient (French pronunciation: [lɔʁjɑ̃]; Breton: An Oriant) is a commune and seaport in the Morbihan department of Brittany, Western France.

== History ==
=== Prehistory and classical antiquity ===
Beginning around 3000 BC, settlements in the area of Lorient are attested by the presence of megalithic architecture. Ruins of Roman roads (linking Vannes to Quimper and Port-Louis to Carhaix) confirm Gallo-Roman presence.

=== Founding ===
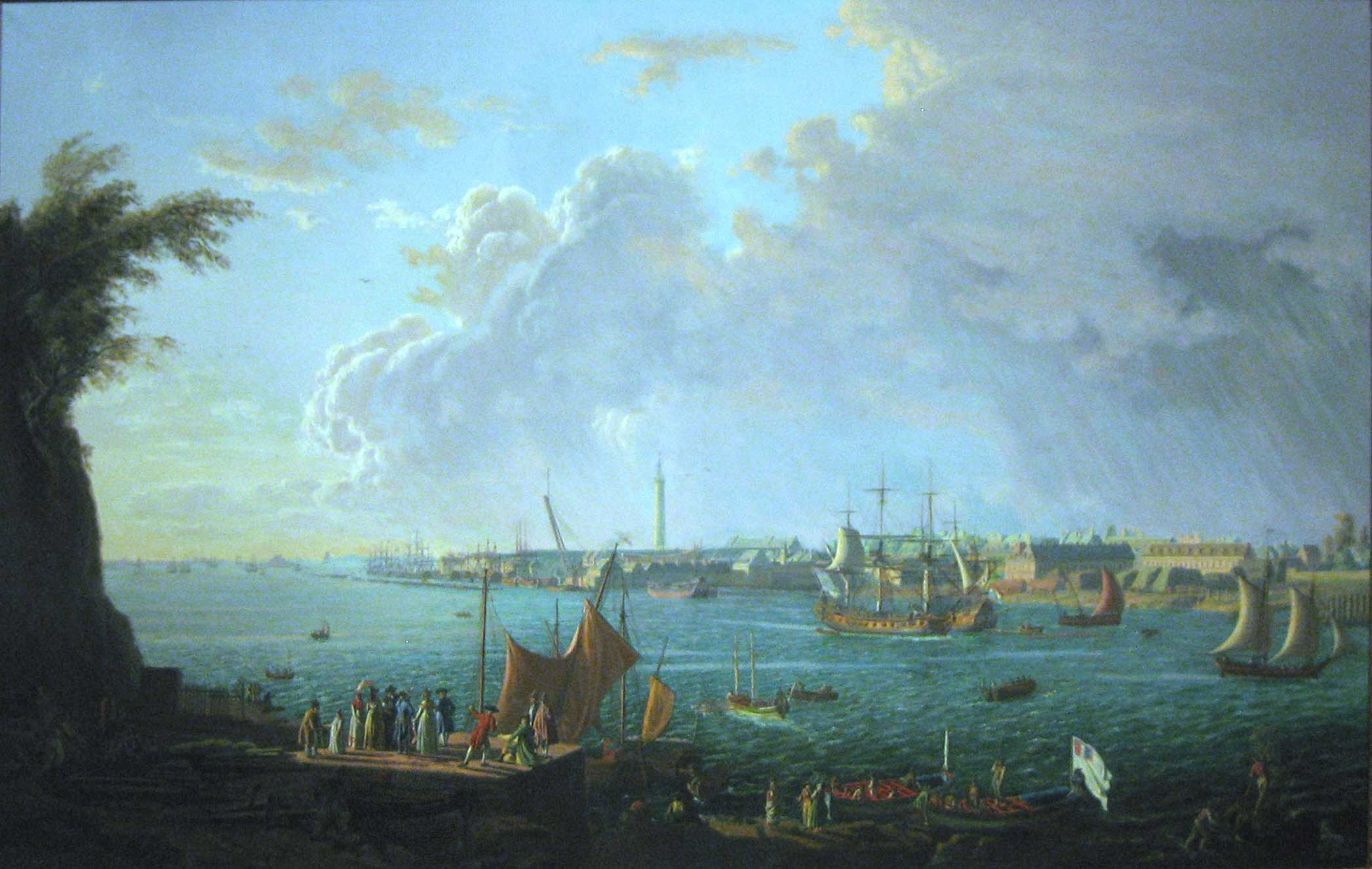
Lorient in the 18th century

In 1664, Jean-Baptiste Colbert founded the French East Indies Company. In June 1666, an ordinance of Louis XIV granted lands of Port-Louis to the company, along with Faouédic on the other side of the roadstead. One of its directors, Denis Langlois, bought lands at the confluence of the Scorff and the Blavet rivers, and built slipways. At first, it only served as a subsidiary of Port-Louis, where offices and warehouses were located. The following years, the operation was almost abandoned, but in 1675, during the Franco-Dutch War, the French East Indies Company scrapped its base in Le Havre since it was too exposed during wartime, and transferred its infrastructures to l'Enclot, out of which Lorient grew. The company then erected a chapel, workshops, forges, and offices, leaving Port-Louis permanently.

The city's name is derived from Le Soleil d'Orient, the first ship constructed at the site, in 1669. Workers gave the site the name of the ship, which, by contraction, became simply L'Orient and finally Lorient.

The French Royal Navy opened a base there in 1690, under the command of Colbert de Seignelay, who inherited his father's position as Secretary of State of the Navy. At the same time, privateers from Saint-Malo took shelter there. In 1700, the town grew out of l'Enclot following a law forcing people to leave the domain to move to the Faouédic heath. In 1702, there were about 6,000 inhabitants in Lorient, though activities slowed, and the town began to decline.

=== Growth under the Company of the Indies ===
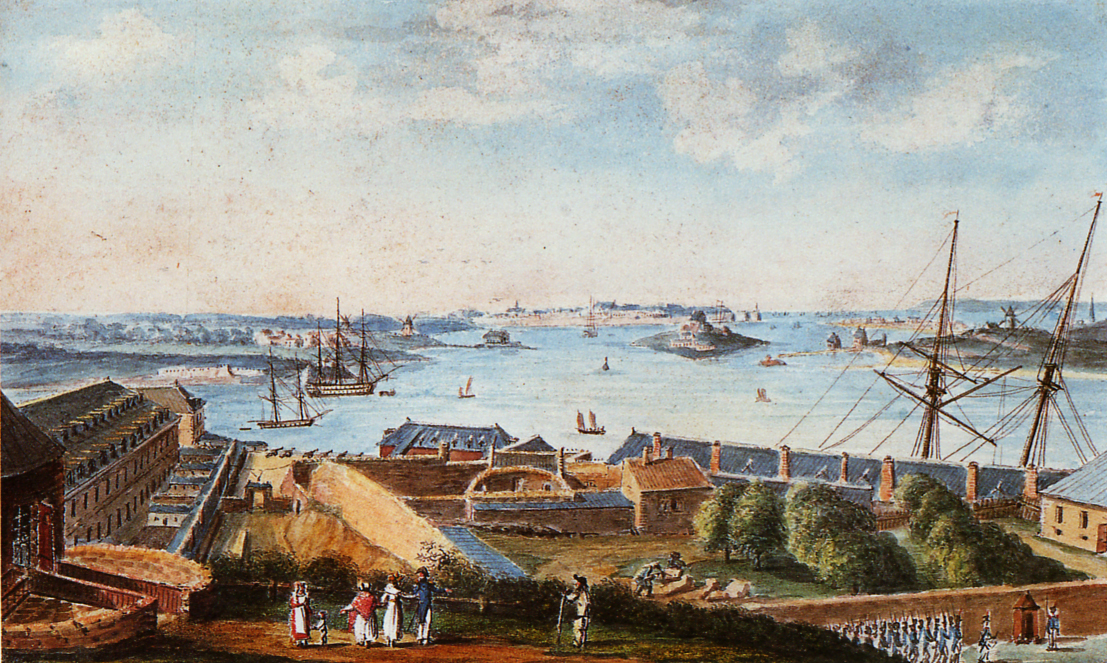
L'Enclos at the end of the 18th century

The town experienced a period of growth when John Law formed the Perpetual Company of the Indies by absorbing other chartered companies (including the French East India Company), and chose Lorient as its operations base. Despite the economic bubble caused by the Company in 1720, the city was still growing as it took part in the Atlantic triangular slave trade. From 1720 to 1790, 156 ships deported an estimated 43,000 slaves. In 1732, the Company decided to transfer its sales headquarters from Nantes to Lorient, and asked architect Jacques Gabriel to raise new buildings out of dimension stones to host these new activities, and to embellish the L'Enclos domain. Sales began in 1734, peaking up to 25 million livres tournois. In 1769, the Company's monopoly ended with the scrapping of the company itself, under the influence of the physiocrats.

Until the Company's closure, the city took advantage of its prosperity. In 1738, there were 14,000 inhabitants, or 20,000 considering the outlying villages of Kerentrech, Merville, La Perrière, Calvin, and Keryado, which are now neighbourhoods within the present-day city limits. In 1735, new streets were laid out and in 1738, it was granted city status. Further work was undertaken as the streets began to be paved, wharves and slipways were built along the Faouédic river, and thatched houses were replaced with stone buildings following 18th-century classical architecture style as it was the case for l'Enclos. In 1744, the city walls were erected, and proved quickly useful as Lorient was raided in September 1746. Following the demise of the Company, the city lost one-seventh of its population.

In 1769, the city evolved into a full-scale naval base for the Royal Navy when Louis XV bought out the Company's infrastructures for 17,500,000 livres tournois. From 1775 on, the American Revolutionary War brought a surge in activity, as many privateers hailed from Lorient. When the war ended, transatlantic lines opened to the United States, and in 1785, a new commercial company started under Calonne's tutelage (then Controller-General of Finances) with the same goal as the previous entities, i.e. conducting trade in India and China, with again Lorient standing as its operative base.

The French Revolution and the subsequent Napoleonic Wars put an end to trade for nearly two decades.

=== 19th and early 20th centuries ===
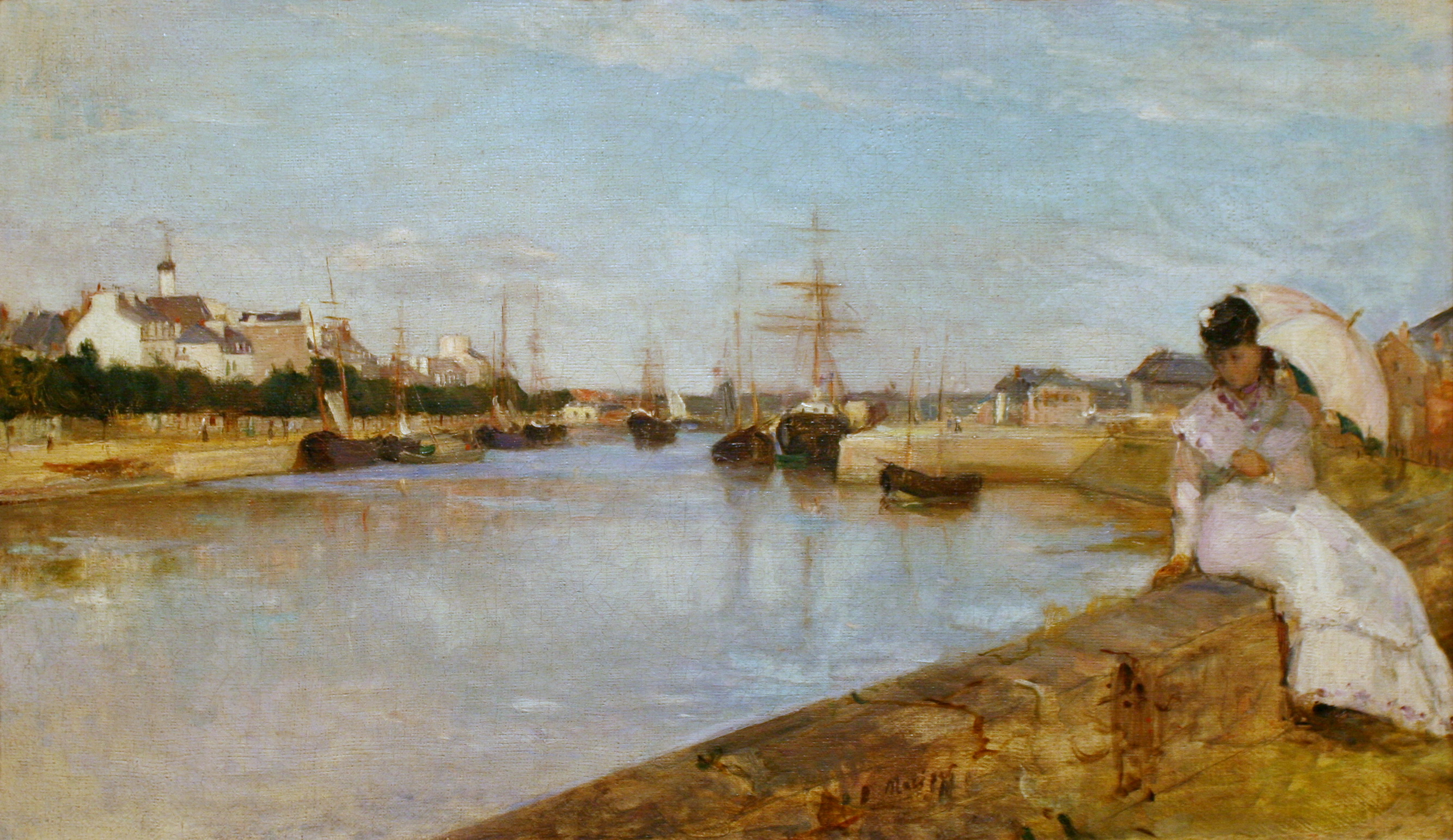
The Harbor at Lorient, 1869 painting by Berthe Morisot.

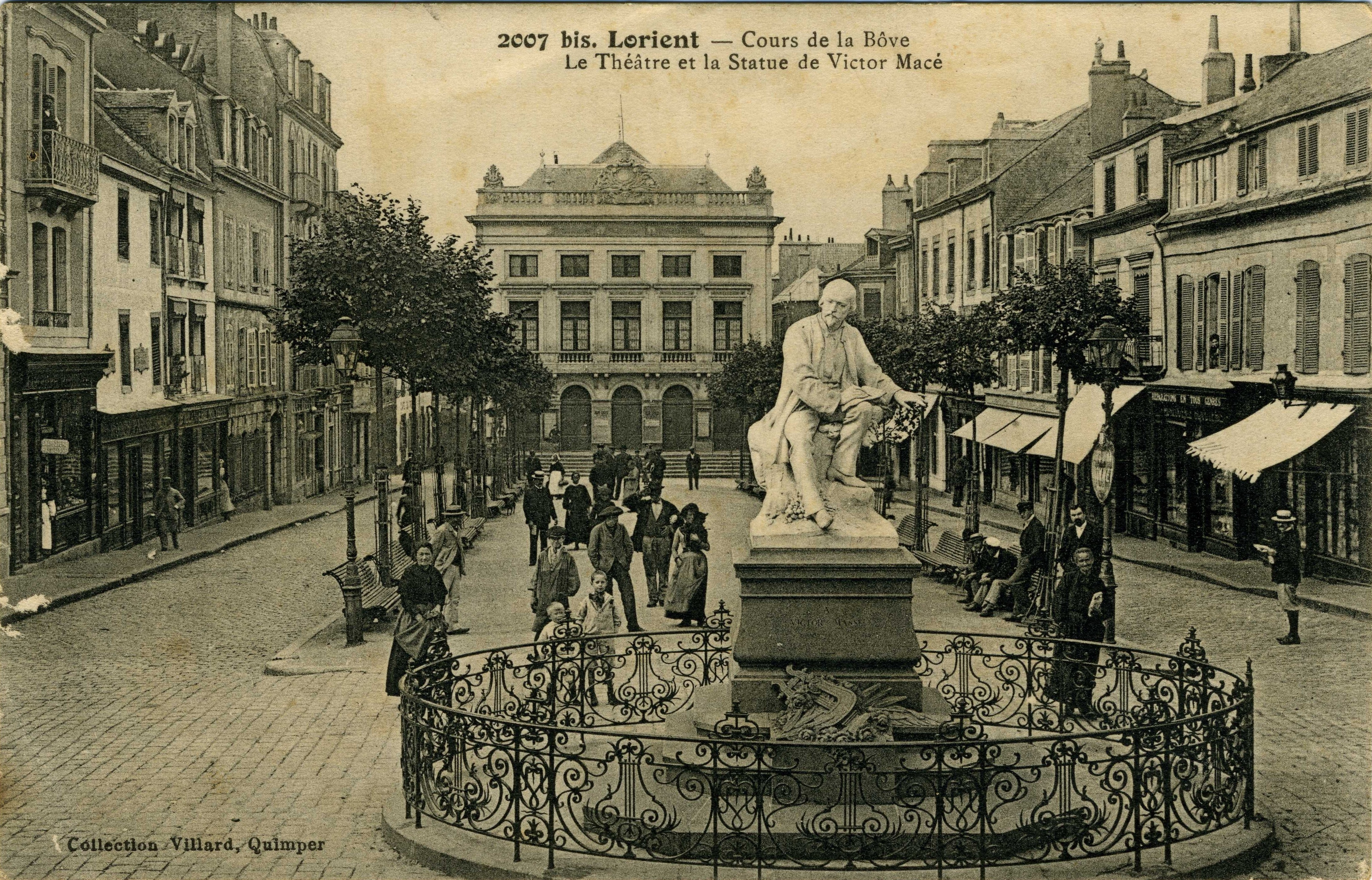
Cours de la Bôve (1907)

Maritime activities slowed at the start of the 19th century. Activity at the shipyards and naval base reached a low that would last until the July Monarchy. During this period, the city was more of an administrative center. The first secondary school opened in 1822, a lazaretto in 1823, and barracks in 1839.

The city began to modernize in the second quarter of the century; in 1825, a roofed slipway and a drydock were added to the shipyards. A sardine cannery opened the same year. The first gasworks was built in 1845.

In the second half of the 19th century, the steam engine allowed the ports to strengthen their output. The first locomotive reached the city in 1865. In 1861, the original drydock was enlarged as a second one was dug out. The same year, the ironclad Couronne was built on a design directly inspired by the Gloire class, though unlike her wooden-hull predecessors, she was entirely made of iron. She was followed in 1876 by the ironclad Redoutable, the first ship in the world with a steel structure.

In 1889, fishing expanded following the creation of the municipal fish market, and the arrival of steam-powered fishing trawlers in 1900. The Keroman fishing port construction started in 1920.

=== World War II ===
In 1941, the Germans, then occupying France, established a U-boat base at Lorient. The submarine facilities quickly became targets of constant bombing from Allied air forces. The Germans decided to build a complex of bomb-proof submarine pens, their largest U-boat base, which would house the 2nd and the 10th U-boat flotillas for the bulk of the Battle of the Atlantic. Karl Dönitz, then supreme commander of the U-boat Arm, moved his staff into the Kernevel villa, just across the water from Keroman, in Larmor-Plage.

In 1943–1944, Lorient was nearly razed to the ground by Allied bombing, which failed to destroy the submarine pens despite 4,000 tons of bombs dropped. According to the book Steel Boats, Iron Hearts (by former U-505 crewman Hans Goebeler), after the Allies failed to damage the U-boat bunkers the bombing shifted to the city itself to deny the Germans workers and other resources. Before the bombings, thousands of leaflets were dropped on the population instructing the inhabitants to evacuate. Between 14 January 1943 and 17 February 1943, as many as 500 high-explosive aerial bombs and more than 60,000 incendiary bombs were dropped on Lorient.

After the Normandy landings in June 1944 and the subsequent breakout, Lorient was surrounded by Allied troops on 12 August 1944. Its usefulness as a naval base gone, Lorient was left in a state of siege, surrounded by the French Forces of the West, supported by a US infantry division. On 10 May 1945, the German garrison surrendered, two days after the official final unconditional surrender of Germany. In 1949, the city of Lorient was awarded the Legion of Honour and the Croix de guerre 1939–1945.

=== Reconstruction ===
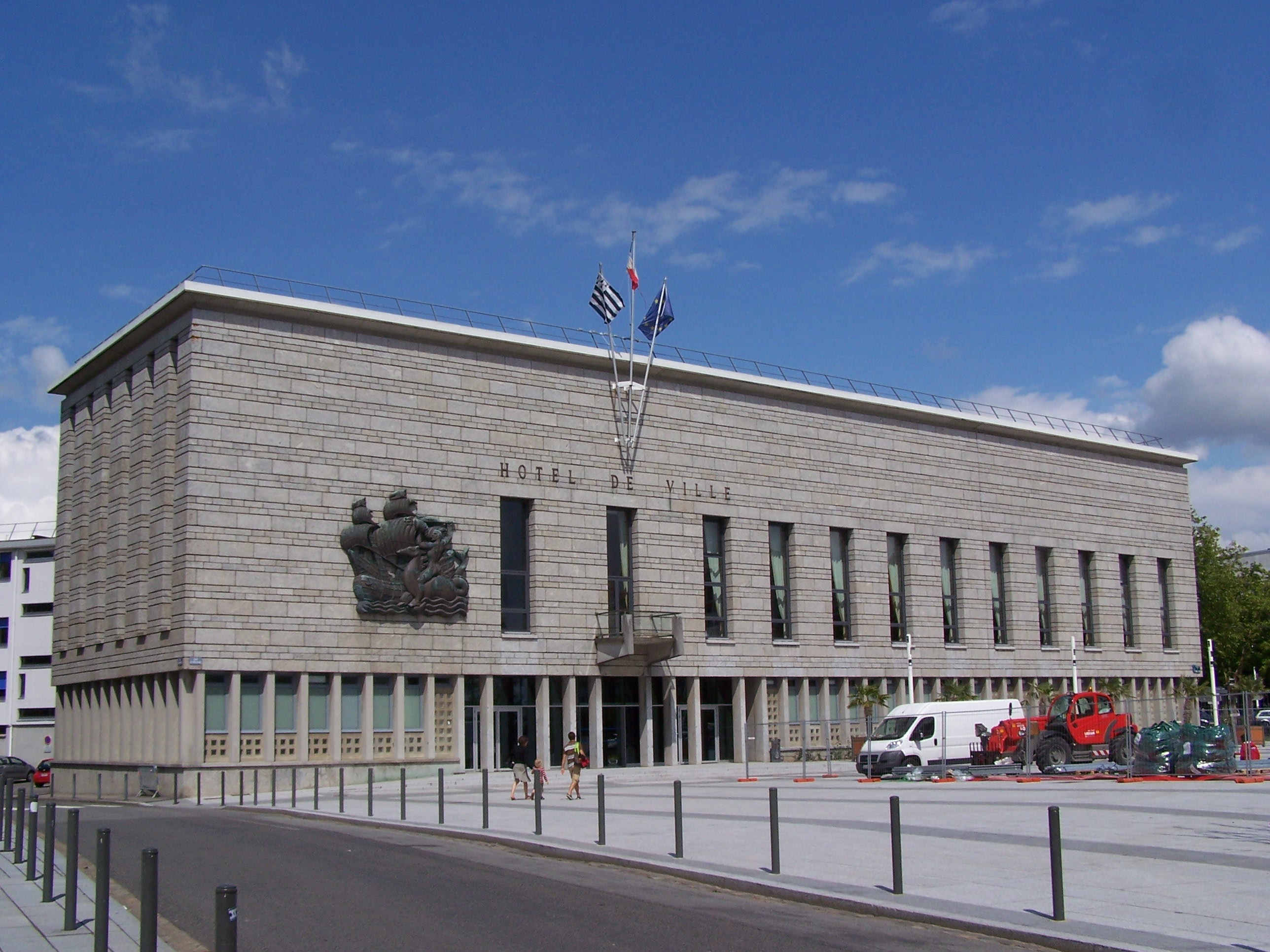
The Hôtel de Ville (city hall)

In April 1945, the Reconstruction Ministry advocated the use of temporary wooden shacks. These shelters were shipped as a kit to be built on site. In 1948, there were 28 settlements under the city's authority, and 20 more in the urban area, distributed among the neighboring towns of Ploemeur, Lanester, Hennebont and Quéven. Each of these neighbourhoods could hold up to 280 houses. A new Hôtel de Ville (city hall) was completed in 1960.

This temporary housing would stand from 10 to 40 years depending on the location. The last shack in the largest settlement, Soye, was torn down in 1991. Today, only a few buildings dating to the 18th century still stand.

== Geography ==
=== Location ===
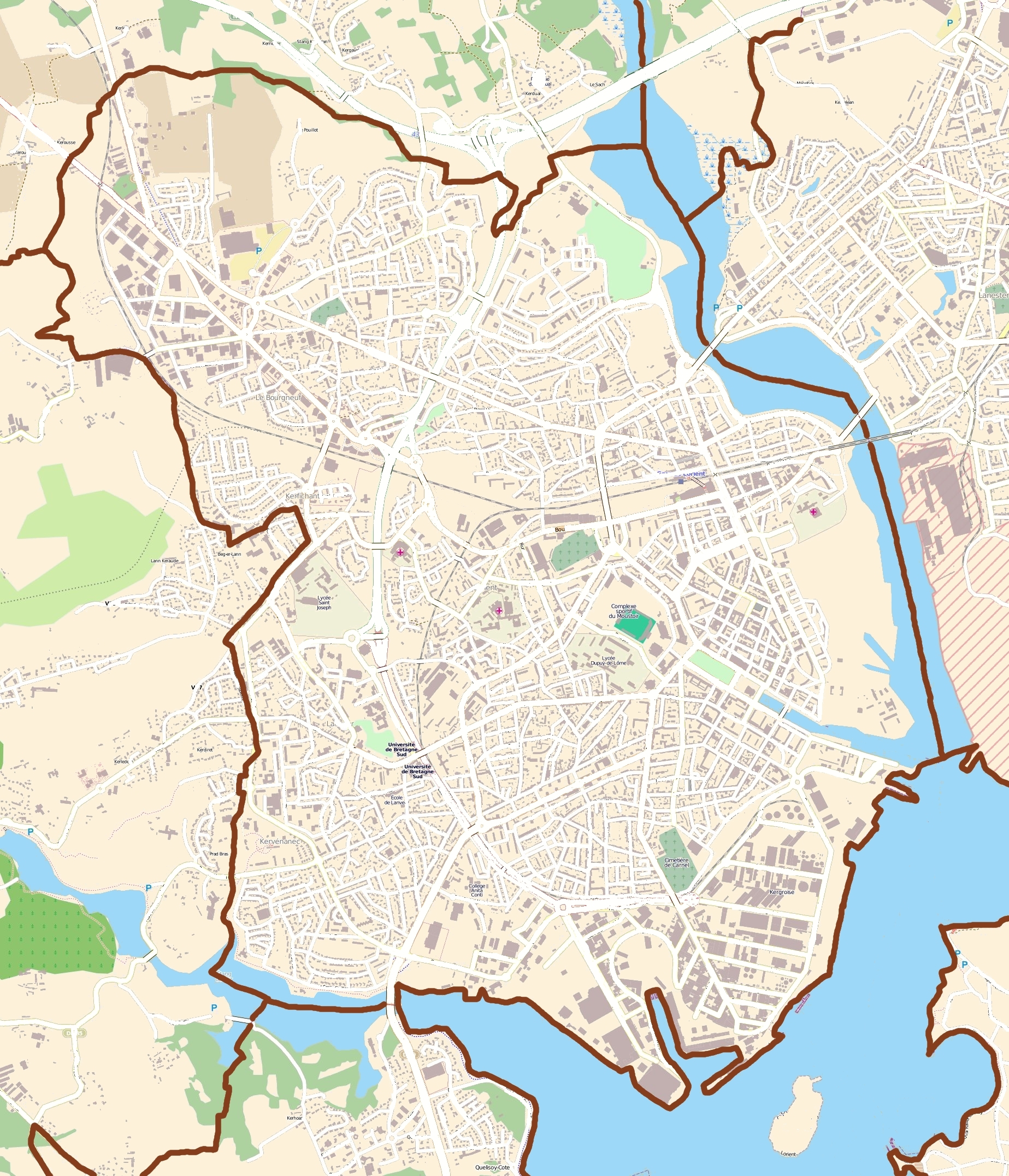
Map of Lorient

Lorient is located on the south coast of Brittany, where the rivers Scorff and Blavet join to form the roadstead of Lorient, before discharging into the Atlantic Ocean. The river Ter used to flow into the estuary to the south of the city, however, a dam was constructed in 1967, stopping the flow. The city is 503 kilometres (313 mi) south-west of Paris, 153 kilometres (95 mi) south-west of Rennes and 158 kilometres (98 mi) north-west of Nantes.

The city comprises different neighbourhoods:

- Bois du Château
- Keryado
- Saint-Armel
- Kerentrech
- Le Gaillec
- Le Manio
- Kerdual
- Kervénanec
- Lanveur
- Keroman
- Kergroise
- Carnel
- Kerfichant
- Kerolay
- Kerguestenen
- Le Mir
- La Perrière
- La Ville Neuve
- La Ville en Bois
- Kermélo
- Le Ter
- Kerlin
- Merville
- La Nouvelle Ville
- Le « bout du monde »
- Saint-Maudé
- Frébault-Polygone
- Quehélio
- Kervaric
- Keryvalant
- La Fontaine des Anglais
- Kerforn
- Le petit et le grand Batteur
- Le Kreisker
- Kerguillet
- Le Parco
- Soye

Adjacent towns:

=== Climate ===
Under the Köppen climate classification, Lorient experiences an oceanic climate (Cfb), with mild winters and cool to warm summers. Precipitation is evenly distributed throughout the year. Frost is rare in winter, as are days over 30 °C (86 °F) during summer.

Climate data for Lorient (Lann-Bihoué Airport) 1991–2020 normals, extremes 1952–present
Month	Jan	Feb	Mar	Apr	May	Jun	Jul	Aug	Sep	Oct	Nov	Dec	Year
Record high °C (°F)	16.8 (62.2)	18.4 (65.1)	23.3 (73.9)	27.1 (80.8)	29.8 (85.6)	35.9 (96.6)	37.6 (99.7)	37.5 (99.5)	31.0 (87.8)	28.4 (83.1)	19.6 (67.3)	16.4 (61.5)	37.6 (99.7)
Mean maximum °C (°F)	13.5 (56.3)	14.2 (57.6)	17.5 (63.5)	21.3 (70.3)	25.3 (77.5)	28.9 (84.0)	29.7 (85.5)	29.1 (84.4)	26.5 (79.7)	21.0 (69.8)	17.0 (62.6)	13.9 (57.0)	31.4 (88.5)
Mean daily maximum °C (°F)	9.7 (49.5)	10.4 (50.7)	12.6 (54.7)	15.0 (59.0)	18.1 (64.6)	20.8 (69.4)	22.5 (72.5)	22.6 (72.7)	20.7 (69.3)	16.8 (62.2)	13.0 (55.4)	10.4 (50.7)	16.0 (60.8)
Daily mean °C (°F)	6.9 (44.4)	7.1 (44.8)	8.8 (47.8)	10.7 (51.3)	13.7 (56.7)	16.4 (61.5)	18.0 (64.4)	18.1 (64.6)	16.1 (61.0)	13.3 (55.9)	9.8 (49.6)	7.5 (45.5)	12.2 (54.0)
Mean daily minimum °C (°F)	4.0 (39.2)	3.8 (38.8)	5.0 (41.0)	6.4 (43.5)	9.3 (48.7)	11.9 (53.4)	13.6 (56.5)	13.5 (56.3)	11.5 (52.7)	9.7 (49.5)	6.6 (43.9)	4.6 (40.3)	8.3 (46.9)
Mean minimum °C (°F)	−3.5 (25.7)	−2.7 (27.1)	−1.0 (30.2)	0.4 (32.7)	3.5 (38.3)	6.3 (43.3)	8.9 (48.0)	8.0 (46.4)	6.0 (42.8)	2.8 (37.0)	−0.1 (31.8)	−2.6 (27.3)	−4.9 (23.2)
Record low °C (°F)	−13.1 (8.4)	−11.0 (12.2)	−7.4 (18.7)	−4.1 (24.6)	−1.1 (30.0)	1.6 (34.9)	3.4 (38.1)	4.1 (39.4)	1.0 (33.8)	−1.8 (28.8)	−5.0 (23.0)	−8.7 (16.3)	−13.1 (8.4)
Average precipitation mm (inches)	109.0 (4.29)	82.5 (3.25)	66.2 (2.61)	67.5 (2.66)	66.0 (2.60)	52.0 (2.05)	55.2 (2.17)	53.3 (2.10)	65.7 (2.59)	103.8 (4.09)	107.6 (4.24)	114.5 (4.51)	943.3 (37.14)
Average precipitation days (≥ 1.0 mm)	14.3	11.6	10.9	10.6	9.8	8.0	8.3	7.7	8.3	12.6	13.8	14.2	130.2
Average relative humidity (%)	88	85	82	79	81	80	80	81	84	87	87	88	83.5
Mean monthly sunshine hours	70.6	98.6	143.7	190.8	214.1	224.3	231.7	219.4	192.8	119.9	87.1	72.0	1,865
Source: Météo France, Infoclimat (humidity, 1961–1990), and Meteociel

== Population ==
In 2022, the intercommunality Lorient Agglomération had 208,113 inhabitants. Lorient is the most populous commune in Morbihan département, although the préfecture is the slightly smaller commune of Vannes. Inhabitants of Lorient are called Lorientais.

The population data in the table and graph below refer to the commune of Lorient proper, in its geography at the given years. The commune of Lorient absorbed the former commune of Keryado in 1947.

Historical population

Year	Pop.	±% p.a.
1793	22,318	—
1800	17,837	−3.15%
1806	20,553	+2.39%
1821	17,115	−1.21%
1831	18,322	+0.68%
1836	18,975	+0.70%
1841	23,621	+4.48%
1846	26,434	+2.28%
1851	25,694	−0.57%
1856	28,412	+2.03%
1861	35,462	+4.53%
1866	37,655	+1.21%
1872	34,660	−1.37%

Year	Pop.	±% p.a.
1876	35,165	+0.36%
1881	37,812	+1.46%
1886	40,055	+1.16%
1891	42,116	+1.01%
1896	41,894	−0.11%
1901	44,640	+1.28%
1906	46,403	+0.78%
1911	49,039	+1.11%
1921	46,314	−0.57%
1926	41,592	−2.13%
1931	42,853	+0.60%
1936	45,817	+1.35%
1946	11,838	−12.66%

Year	Pop.	±% p.a.
1954	47,095	+18.84%
1962	60,566	+3.19%
1968	66,444	+1.56%
1975	69,769	+0.70%
1982	62,554	−1.55%
1990	59,271	−0.67%
1999	59,189	−0.02%
2007	58,135	−0.22%
2012	57,706	−0.15%
2017	57,149	−0.19%
2023	58,329	+0.34%

Source: EHESS and INSEE

=== Breton language ===
The municipality launched a linguistic plan through Ya d'ar brezhoneg on 25 January 2007.

In 2008, 2.71% of the children attended the bilingual schools in primary education.

== Economy ==
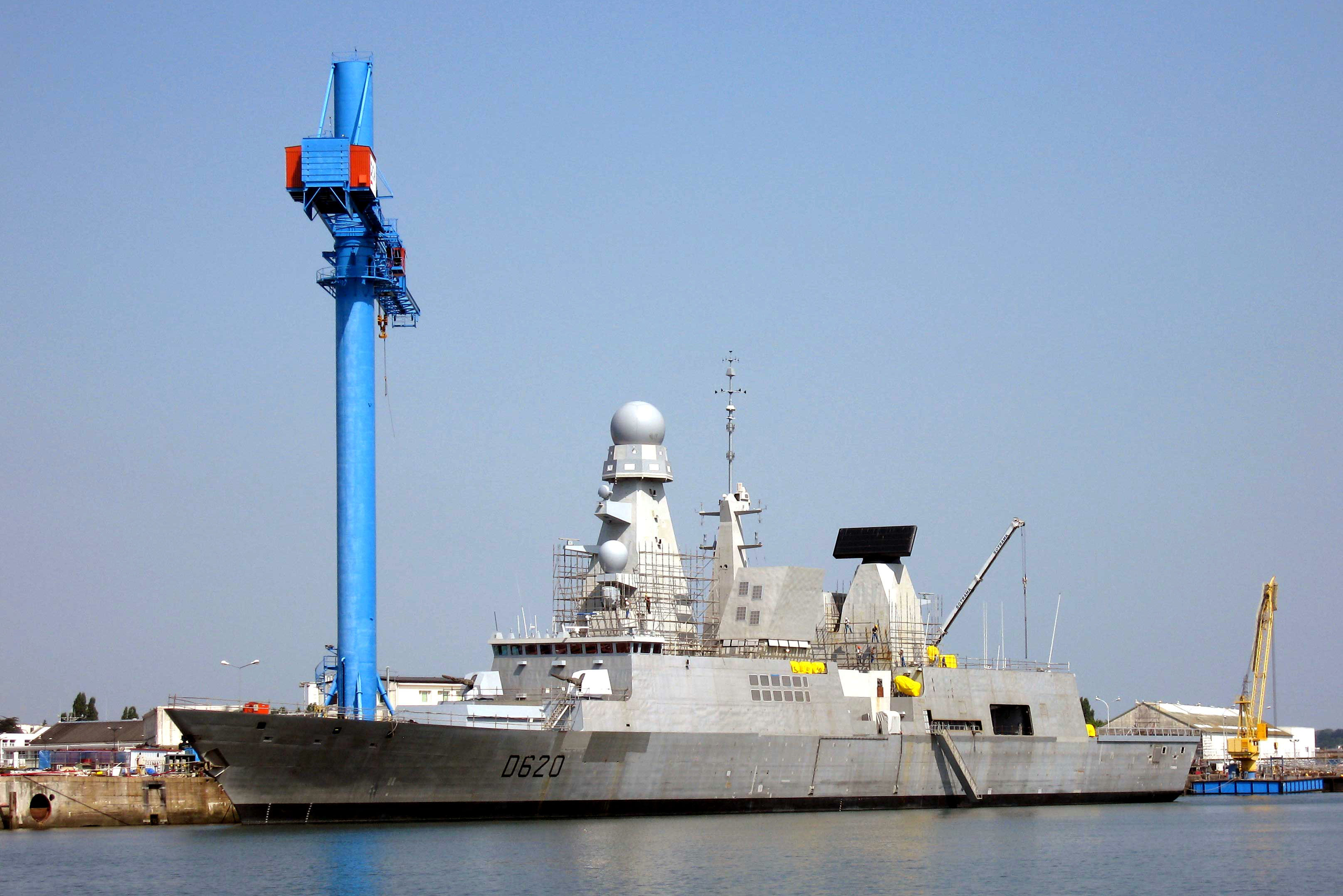
Ongoing building of Horizon-class frigate Forbin at DCNS shipyard in 2006

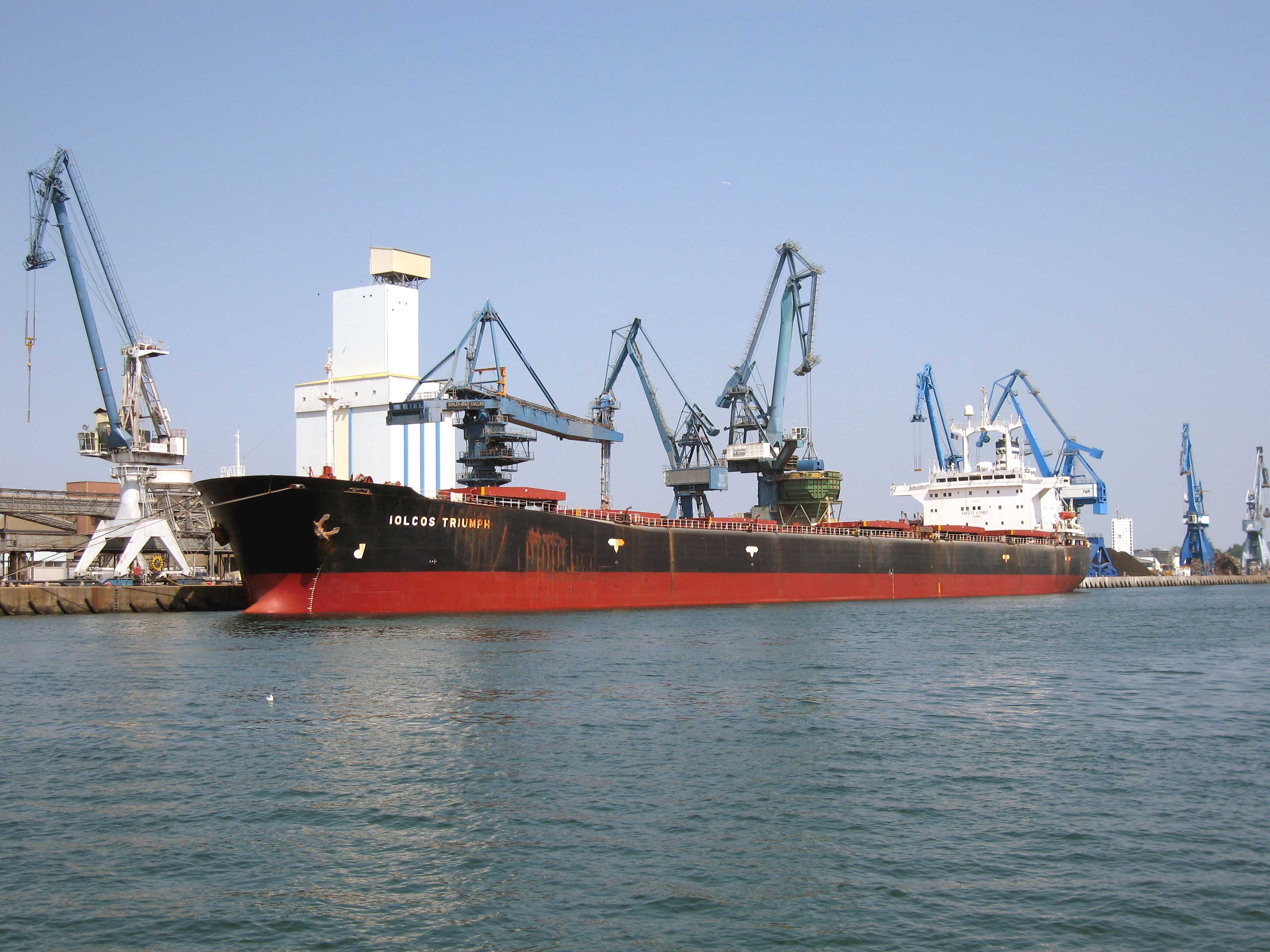
Soy being unloaded at Kergroise port

=== Ports ===
Seven Seas Voyager leaving port

Lorient is commonly referred to as La ville aux cinq ports ("the city of five ports"): military, fishing, commercial, passengers and yachting. In 2010, the sector represented 9,600 direct jobs for a total 12,000 jobs (with indirect jobs accounted for), or 12% of local employment.

- Keroman fishing port (fr): In 2010, with a catch of 27,000 tons, it was second only to Boulogne-sur-Mer regarding catch tonnage among French fishing ports, but first considering the cash value. It accounts for 3,000 jobs (including 700 fishermen) and 130 fishing vessels.
- Kergroise cargo port : With 2.6 million tons of cargo per year (including oil, cattle fodder, sand, containers), it ranks first in Brittany.
- Marinas : mooring berths are situated on Lorient (370), Kernevel (1,000), Port-Louis (450), Gâvres (57) and Guidel (102). Additionally, there is an 800 metres (2,600 ft) long dock dedicated to offshore competitive sailing (Pôle course au large), recently built within the former submarine base.
- Passenger ships : each year, more 457,500 passengers set sail to the nearby islands of Groix and Belle-Île-en-Mer.
- Military : though no longer a French Navy base, new warships are still built at DCNS, docking temporarily on wharves along the Scorff river.

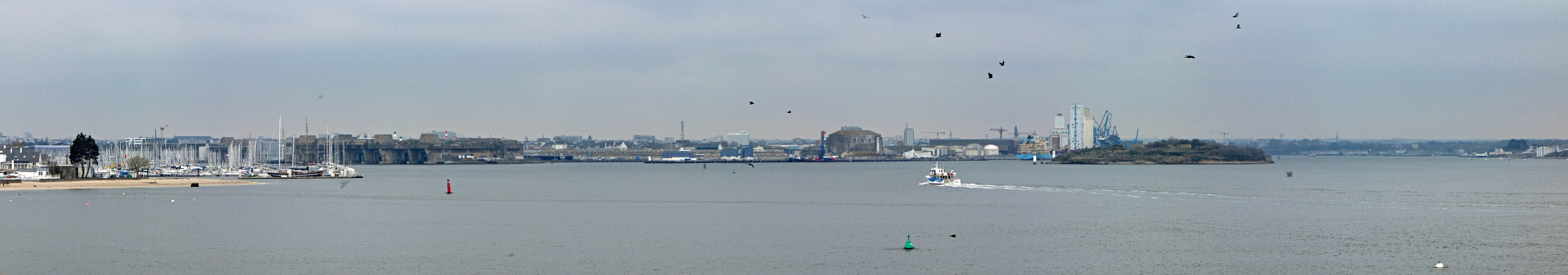
The port and disused submarine base

=== Industry ===
From its founding, shipbuilding has always been of great importance to the city. DCNS continues the legacy of the formerly state-owned shipyards (colloquially known as l'Arsenal) that began operation in 1690. It still builds warships, mainly frigates. There is also a substantial industrial base in Keroman to support the fishing fleet.

=== Transport ===
Lorient South Brittany Airport is situated just west of the city at Lann Bihoue. It operates charter flights and regular flights to Toulouse. It used to operate direct flights to Paris and Lyon all year long and other city such as London and Porto in the Summer.

The Gare de Lorient is the railway station, offering connections to Quimper, Nantes, Rennes, Paris (less than three hours by TGV) and several regional destinations.

== Education ==
Schools in Lorient belong to the Academy of Rennes.

=== Tertiary ===
- CPGE at Dupuy-de-Lôme and Saint Joseph-La salle lycées.
- Université de Bretagne Sud.
- Institut universitaire de technologie de Lorient
- École nationale supérieure d'ingénieurs de Bretagne Sud
- École supérieure d'art.
- École nationale de musique et de danse.

== Military ==
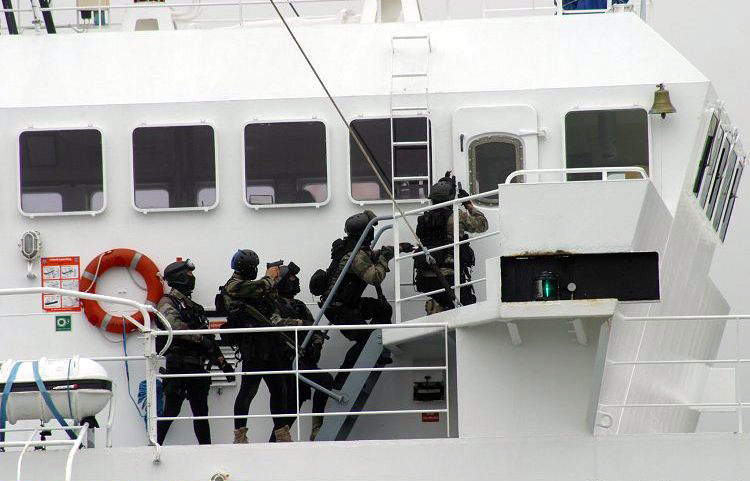
The Commando Jaubert storming a ship in a mock assault

Active units based near Lorient:

- Naval Commandos (Commando Marine): the special forces of the French Navy. It is one of the most selective units among the French armed forces, equivalent in their mission and affiliation to Navy SEALs or British Special Boat Service. Five out of the six existing naval commandos (Note: In the French Navy nomenclature, commandos are understood as units, not individuals.) are based in Lanester, just across the Scorff river from Lorient. The Naval Fusilier & Commando Training School is also based here.
- Lann-Bihoué Naval Aviation Base: Five squadrons ("flottilles") are based in Ploemeur. Their tasks include airborne early warning, maritime patrol and air-sea rescue.

== Lorient Submarine Base ==
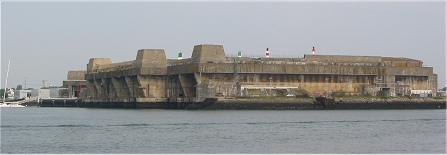
The former submarine pens at Keroman

Lorient was the location of an extensive submarine base, built by the Germans in World War II and used subsequently by the French Navy. Head of the U-Boat Arm Karl Dönitz decided to construct the base on 28 June 1940. Between November 1940 and January 1942 a number of gigantic reinforced concrete structures were built. including three on the Keroman peninsula. They are called K1, K2 and K3. In 1944 work began on a fourth structure. The base was capable of sheltering thirty submarines. Lorient was damaged by Allied bombing raids but the naval base survived the war.

Following the German surrender the base was used by the French Navy, named for Jacques Stosskopf, a hero of the French Resistance who had worked there. The base was decommissioned in 1995 and turned over to civilian use. It is now a museum.

== Culture ==
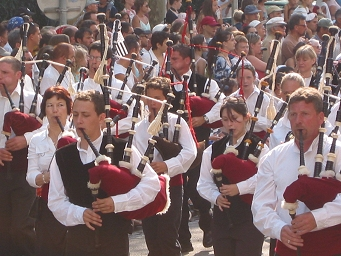
Pipers during the grande parade

=== Events ===
Each year in August since 1970, Lorient hosts the Festival interceltique, bringing together artists from all the Celtic world (Brittany, Cornwall, Scotland, Ireland, Wales, Galicia, Asturias, Australia, Acadia and Isle of Man). Each year, a Celtic nation is chosen as honored guest. It is one of the biggest festivals in Europe by attendance (800,000 people for the 40th edition)

=== Media ===
Lorient is home to TébéSud (formerly TyTélé), a local TV channel covering Morbihan through DTT.

== Religion ==
Catholic churches are among the main religious landmarks of Lorient. While the Church of Our Lady of the Assumption was built in 1850 in a revivalist neo-Gothic style, the church of Saint Joan of Arc was built in a neo-Roman style in the 1930s by French architect Jean Desbois and a few years later in 1955, and the modernist church of Notre-Dame-de-Victoire is the highest point of Lorient with its 4-meter-high concrete bell tower though the population never really accepted this new style. Major Catholic festivals such as Christmas, Carnaval, Easter and the Pardon are celebrated as major feasts of the city.

== Sports ==
=== Football ===
The most popular club in Lorient is FC Lorient, which currently play in Ligue 1, after winning Ligue 2 in 2025. They are nicknamed les Merlus. They play their home fixtures at Stade du Moustoir. Christian Gourcuff managed the team for over 20 years (aggregate years).

=== Sailing ===
The converted submarine base has been home port to several skippers and their sailing teams:

- Jérémie Beyou (Delta Dore),
- Pascal Bidégorry (Banque Populaire),
- Franck Cammas (Groupama), winner of the 2011–12 Volvo Ocean Race
- Samantha Davies (Roxy),
- Jean-Baptiste Dejeanty (Maisonneuve),
- Jean-Pierre Dick (Paprec-Virbac),
- Yann Elies (Generali),
- Alain Gautier (Foncia),
- Sébastien Josse (British Telecom),
- Marc Thiercelin (DCNS)

Lorient was also a staging port during the 2011–12 Volvo Ocean Race, as well as the starting point of la Solitaire du Figaro (2009 edition).

Eric Tabarly built three out of his six Pen Duick boats in Lorient.

== Notable Lorientais ==
=== Arts and literature ===
- Marie-Léontine Bordes-Pène (1858–1924), pianist
- Charles Delioux (1825–1915), composer and pianist
- Marie Dorval (1798–1849), actress
- Irène Frain (b. 1950), writer
- Ernest Hello (1828–1885), writer
- Viktor Lazlo (b. 1960), singer
- Rita Strohl (1865–1941), pianist and composer
- Jacques Vaché (1895–1919), writer and artist

=== Sailors ===
- Jean-Baptiste Bompard (1757–1842), took part in the American Revolutionary War as a privateer, later rose to the rank of admiral.
- François Joseph Bouvet (1753–1832), vice admiral and maritime prefect
- Jean-Baptiste Chaigneau (1769–1832), sailor, French consul in Cochinchina
- Pierre-François Forissier, b. 1951, admiral, Chief of Staff of the French Navy (2008–2011)
- Raymond Rallier du Baty (1881–1978), explorer of the Kerguelen islands.

=== Politics ===
- Henri Dupuy de Lôme (1816–1885), naval architect, chief designer of the Napoléon, La Gloire and Gymnote, which were breakthroughs in naval technology, also designed airships, deputy representing Morbihan, member of the Academy of Sciences, senator for life.
- Pierre-Paul Guieysse (1841–1914), Morbihan deputy, Minister of the Colonies.
- Jean-Yves Le Drian, b. 1947, former mayor of Lorient, former Morbihan deputy, former Minister of Defence, former Secretary of State.
- Jules Simon (1814–1896), philosopher, President of the Council of Ministers, senator for life, member of l'Académie française.

=== Sports ===
- Georges Eo, b. 1948, former football player and manager
- Christian Gourcuff, b. 1955, former manager of FC Lorient
- Yoann Gourcuff, b. 1986, son of the former, international midfielder, currently plays for Stade Rennais F.C.
- Ronan Le Crom, b. 1974, goalkeeper
- Enzo Le Fée, b. 2000, midfielder for Sunderland AFC
- Jérémy Morel, b. 1984, left-back for Olympique de Marseille
- Illan Meslier, b. 2000, goalkeeper for Leeds United
- Eli Junior Kroupi, b. 2006, forward for Bournemouth

=== Sciences ===
- Pierre Fatou (1878–1929), mathematician and astronomer
- Nicole Le Douarin, b. 1930, biologist

=== Others ===
- Jacques Andrieux (1917–2005), WWII fighter ace and Compagnon de la Libération.
- Élisabeth Le Port (1919–1943) WWII French Resistance member.
- Jacques Stosskopf (1898–1944), naval engineer, résistant. Mistaken for being a traitor, in 1946 the submarine base was renamed "Base Ingénieur Général Stosskopf" in his honour.

== International relations ==
Lorient is twinned with:

- (Republic of Ireland) Galway, Ireland
- Vigo, Spain
- Wirral, England, United Kingdom
- Ventspils, Latvia
- Ludwigshafen, Germany
- České Budějovice, Czech Republic
- Denizli, Turkey

== See also ==
- Arrondissement of Lorient
- Communes of the Morbihan department
- Festival Interceltique de Lorient
- Fishing port of Lorient-Keroman
- Gabriel Hotel
- Mississippi Company
