= Jacques Stosskopf =

Mort pour la France Jacques Stosskopf
- Born: 27 November 1898; Paris
- Died: 1 September 1944 (aged 45); Natzweiler-Struthof concentration camp
- Cause of death: Executed by the SS
- Other name: Sea Star (pseudonym)
- Education: École Polytechnique
- Occupation: Naval architect
- Known for: Member of the French Resistance
- Children: 2
- Awards: Croix de Guerre; Legion of Honour; Resistance Medal (posthumous)

Jacques Camille Louis Stosskopf (27 November 1898 – 1 September 1944) was a member of the French Resistance and war hero killed by the Nazis. He held the post of deputy director of naval construction at the German-held Lorient U-boat arsenal.

== Early years and military career ==
Born in Paris' 10th arrondissement on 27 November 1898, Jacques Stosskopf was of Alsatian origin and spoke fluent German. Mobilized in 1917 as an aspirant in the French artillery, he was awarded the Croix de Guerre. Admitted to the École polytechnique in October 1920, he graduated 23rd in his class in 1922. In 1924, he became a marine engineer at the Cherbourg arsenal. He was appointed principal engineer in 1929, then Chevalier of the Légion d'Honneur the following year on July 9, 1930. In 1936, he became head of the Nantes district of the Surveillance Department. Chief Engineer 2nd class in 1937, he was promoted to Officer of the Legion of Honor on January 1, 1939. As a naval construction specialist, he was appointed in 1939 as head of the new construction unit at the Lorient arsenal and promoted to the rank of Chief Engineer, 1st Class.

== Resistance hero ==
In June 1940, the base fell under control of the German Kriegsmarine, who used it to repair and resupply their U-boats. Beginning in September 1940, Stosskopf pretended to collaborate with the Germans, using his position to inform Allied forces of submarine movements at Lorient. Stosskopf was denounced under torture by a captured agent of the Alliance network within the French Resistance. He was arrested by the SD in February 1944, but many French believed that the Germans had promoted him.

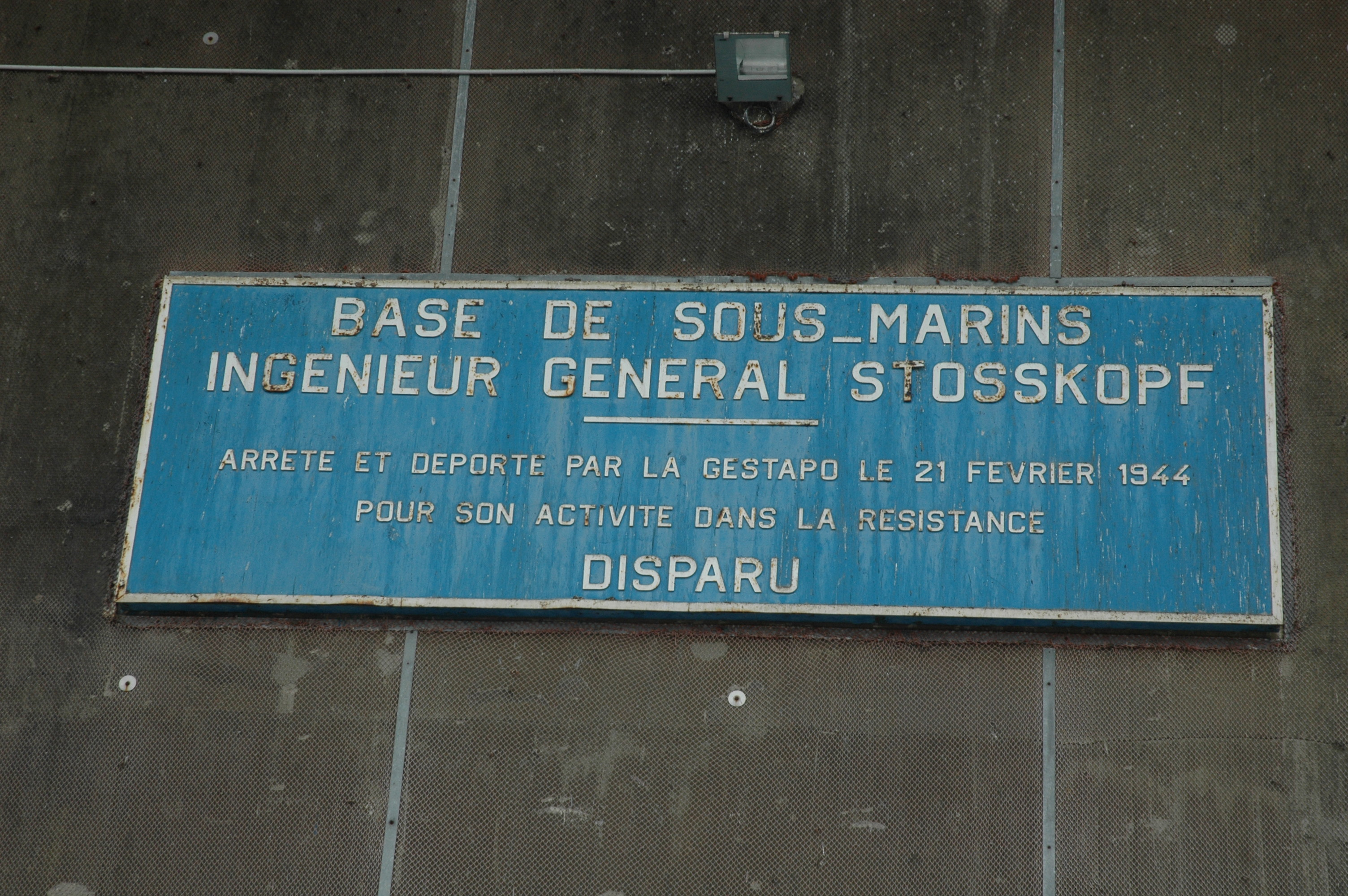
Plaque at the Lorient Submarine Base. Stosskorpf is listed as disparu (disappeared).

The reality was quite different: Stosskopf was tortured by the Gestapo and deported under the Nacht und Nebel programme. He was executed at Struthof camp in Alsace on 1 September 1944, before the arrival of the Allies. Stosskopf was posthumously made a Commander of the Legion of Honour in August 1945, then received the Resistance Medal at the final date of award in 1947. He was also declared Mort pour la France. The submarine base at Lorient was renamed in his honour in July 1946 as Base Ingénieur Général Stosskopf. A BRF (A726) was also named in his honour.
