= Hôtel de Ville, Lorient =

Town hall in Lorient, France

Hôtel de Ville
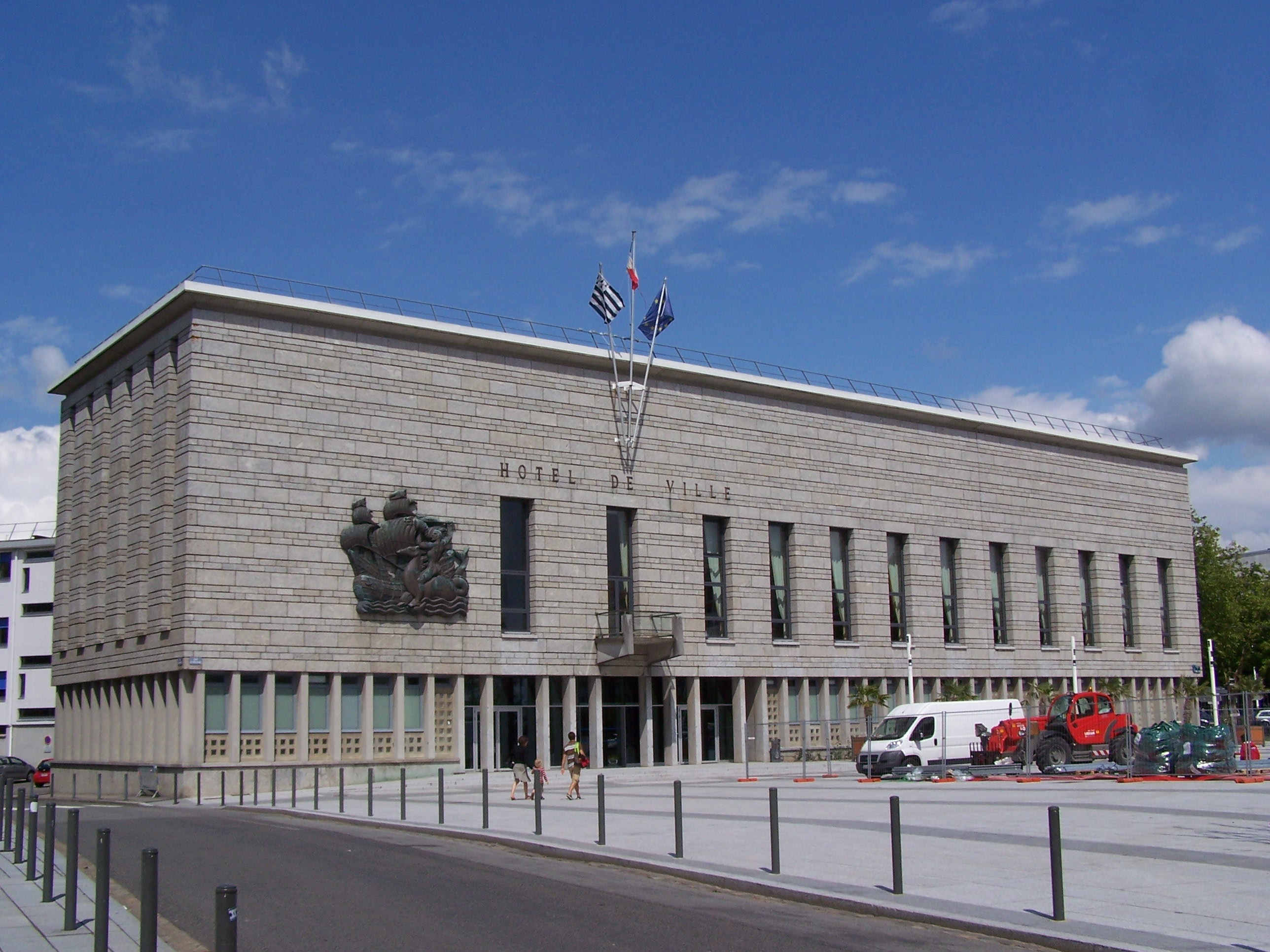
- The main frontage of the Hôtel de Ville in July 2011
- Interactive map of the Hôtel de Ville area

General information
- Type: City hall
- Architectural style: Modern style
- Location: Lorient, France
- Coordinates: 47.7479°N 3.3660°W
- Completed: 1960

Design and construction
- Architect: Jean-Baptiste Hourlier

The Hôtel de Ville (French pronunciation: [otɛl də vil], City Hall) is a municipal building in Lorient, Morbihan, western France, standing on Place de l'Hôtel de Ville.

== History ==
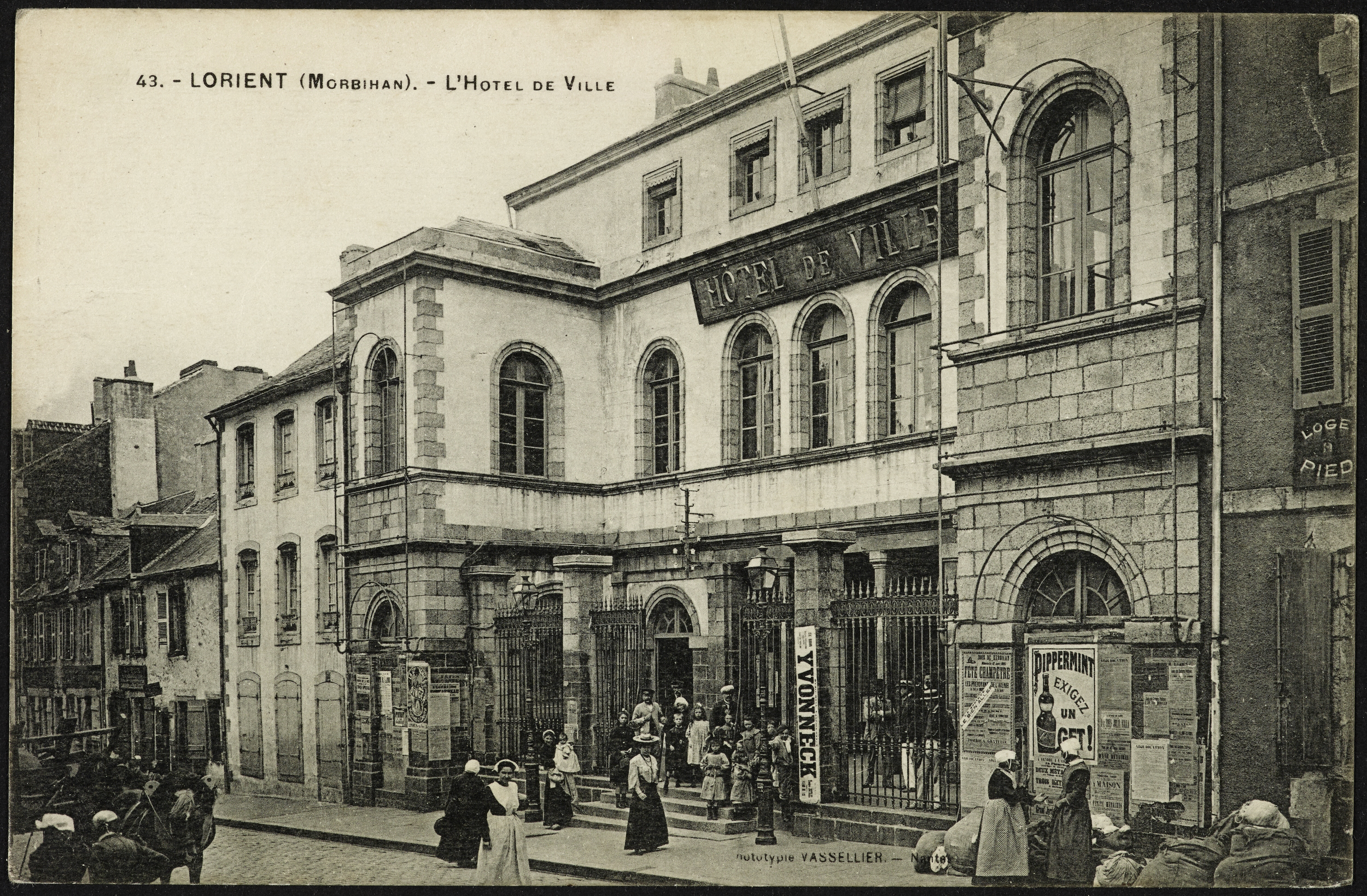
The old town hall

The local municipal council acquired the Cabot family house on Rue de Luzançay for use as its first town hall in 1752. It put a new façade on the building in 1807, and acquired several houses at the back of the building to allow expansion to Rue de l'Hôpital (now Rue Jules Legrand) in 1837. The design involved a symmetrical main frontage of seven bays facing onto Rue de l'Hôpital, with the end bays projected forward as pavilions. The central section featured a three-bay recessed opening formed by two Doric order columns supporting an entablature. The bays on either side of the recessed section and the five bays on the first floor were fenestrated by round-headed windows. The central section also incorporated an attic level fenestrated by five small square casement windows. The complex was expanded again in 1902 and in 1908.

Lorient was an important military target because of its German submarine base and on the night of 23 January 1943, during the Second World War, the town hall was destroyed during an allied bombing raid aimed at cutting off the supply lines to the base. The city council moved to temporary accommodation at Château de Treulan near Sainte-Anne-d'Auray and then, from August 1944, to a boys' upper primary school on the Quai des Indes.

After the war the council decided to commission a new building: the site they selected was in a regeneration area well to the west of the old building, between the River Faouédic and some old fortifications. Construction work on the new building started in January 1957. It was designed by Jean-Baptiste Hourlier, who was a winner of the Prix de Rome, in the modern style, built in reinforced concrete with coursed granite cladding, and was officially opened in July 1960.

The layout involved a large rectangular civic block at the front, with a service block behind, curving along Boulevard du Général Leclerc. The civic block featured a recessed glass entrance to the left of centre. The remainder of the ground floor included a series of narrow windows separated by piers. The left hand side of the first floor was blind but featured a large representation of the civic coat of arms, while the rest of the first floor was fenestrated by 12 tall casement windows. At roof level, there were prominent eaves. Internally, the principal rooms were the Salle du Conseil (council chamber), Salon D'Honneur (the main reception room) and the Salle de Mariages (wedding room).

A major programme of refurbishment works to the public areas of the town hall was completed in 2019.
