= Western France =

Western France may refer to:

- Metropolitan France, the part of France in Europe
- West France (European Parliament constituency): Brittany, Pays de la Loire, and Poitou-Charentes

== See also ==
- French West
- West Francia
- Geography of France
