= Pont du Bonhomme =

Pont in France, in the region of Bretagne

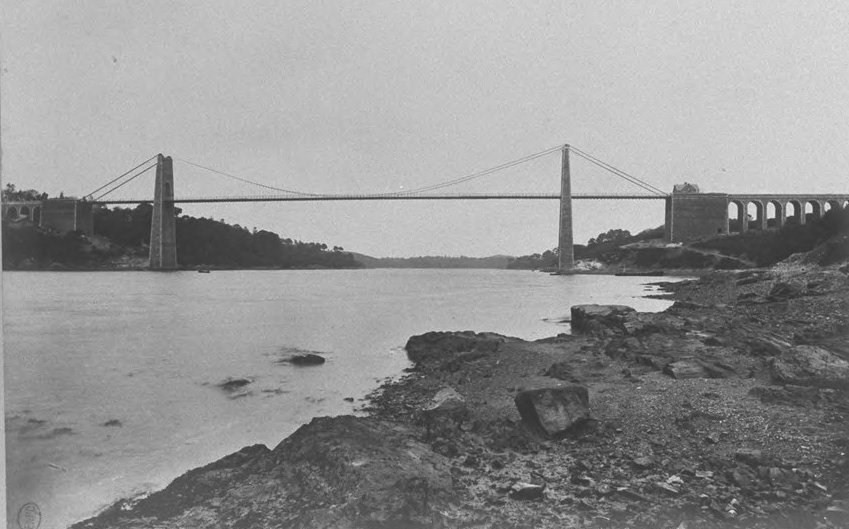
- Pont du Bonhomme during its early years.
- Coordinates: 47°45′53″N 03°18′07″W
- Crosses: Blavet
- Locale: France, Bretagne region, Morbihan department, Kervignac commune.
- Official name: Pont du Bonhomme
- Heritage status: Classified site (1934)

Characteristics
- Design: Cable-stayed bridge
- Material: Steel and masonry
- Total length: 237 m
- Height: 37 m
- Longest span: 163 m

History
- Constructed by: Ferdinand Arnodin
- Opened: 1904 (built in 1900–1904)

Location
- Interactive map of Pont du Bonhomme

The Pont du Bonhomme is located in the Lorient region of France. It links the cities of Kervignac and Lanester across the Blavet river, replacing a ferry that had been in use since the 17th century. Its location at the entrance to the valley was chosen to allow sailing boats to continue providing services to the upstream commune of Hennebont.

The first structure is a cable-stayed truss-girder bridge, built between 1900 and 1904 by Ferdinand Arnodin. Damaged several times during World War II, it was restored after the conflict and put into operation until 1974. It was then demolished, with the exception of its two pillars, and replaced by a second structure by Jacques Mathivat, reusing the girder bridge technique.

== Toponymy ==
The name comes from a rock on the left bank of the Blavet, on the Kervignac side, which, seen from a certain angle, resembles a human form. The Breton toponym, "Roch ar Boulom", captures this meaning.

== History ==
=== Before the bridge ===
The existence of a ferry crossing the Blavet between south Caudan (Note: The Caudan area became part of the Lanester commune as recently as 1909.) and west Kervignac is documented as early as 1681. At the time, it was known as either Passage "de la Couthume" or "du Bonhomme", named after a nearby locality on the Kervignac bank. During the 19th century, it fell into disuse due to the lack of suitable access roads. The various public tenders launched at the time for its management met with little success, as travelers could use the Hennebont bridge upstream, or other ferries downstream, immediately linking the Pen-Mané district of Riantec (Note: Pen-Mané will not be separated from Riantec until 1907 to form the Locmiquélic parish. The status of commune was granted in 1919.) to the center of Lorient.

Several measures were envisaged to boost traffic. In 1874, the General Council of Morbihan called for the enlargement of the passage, but after studying the project, the engineer from the Corps of Bridges and Roads pointed out the lack of viability. A financial contribution was then requested from the two neighboring communes – 5,600 francs from Caudan and 13,600 francs from Kervignac – but was refused by their municipal councils. The abolition of the ferry was finally approved by a ministerial decision on August 14, 1889.

=== First bridge's project ===
The first project for a bridge across the Blavet River was carried out by engineer Noyon in 1849. The cost was an estimated 215,000 francs, excluding the construction of access roads. The French government promised a subsidy of 75,000 francs, with the remaining funds to be provided by local authorities.

The project also included upgrading the road between Lorient and Merlevenez to a departmental road. This condition was approved at the end of 1849 by the Town Councils of Kervignac and Caudan, but objected to by the Town Council of Hennebont. Not finding it in its commercial interest for the road in question to avoid its city, (Note: At the same time, the Quimperlé commune proceeded in the same way to prevent the creation of a bridge down the Laïta.) they passed on their concerns to the prefect, citing the high cost of the project, which was eventually canceled.

=== First bridge's construction ===
A second project was drawn up in the late 19th century. Once again, the Town Hall of Hennebont, where the nearest bridge is located, considered that the construction of the bridge would threaten its commercial activities. When consulted on the subject, they voiced their opposition at the Town Council meeting held on May 31, 1895, requesting that the bridge be over 30 m high, to allow the tallest brigs to pass through to the port of Locoyarne, where a coal and timber trade had developed. They hoped to make the construction costs too high and have the project canceled. The engineers in charge of the project overrule them and set the height at 26 m above the highest tides.

Construction of the bridge was finally decided, and on April 17, 1900, Ferdinand Arnodin's company was awarded the operating concession. The bridge was built between 1903 and 1904. Resistance tests were carried out from November 7 to 11, 1904, and were conclusive, allowing the bridge to be opened for traffic from that date.

=== Operations ===
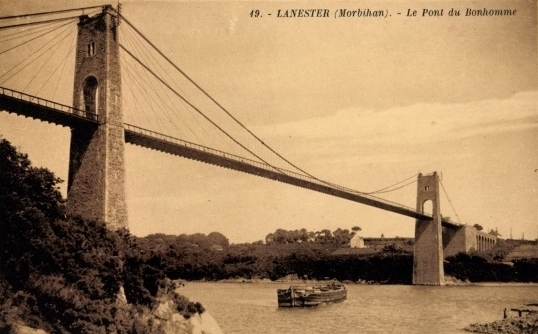
View of the bridge circa 1904.

The first months of operations were disappointing. Monthly revenue was less than 400 francs instead of the expected 2,000 francs. The operator blamed the state of the access roads to the structure. The towns took charge of their upkeep, but because of the high costs involved, in 1922, their municipal councils asked for the roads to be classified as being of public interest.

After World War I, the operator sought to obtain an increase in rights of way. The war had led to a substantial increase in the price of maintenance materials, and other modes of transport had seen similar increases (150% more for the railroads, tripling for the Lorient tramway). However, despite the support of the Lorient Chamber of Commerce and Industry, he was unable to secure the agreement of the cities involved, and obtained only a slight increase limited to carriages and horses.

Faced with these problems, in the early 1920s the operator began to talk about the possibility of the bridge being bought out by the Morbihan General Council, a solution which was eventually implemented. On September 25, 1929, the proposition of repurchasing the bridge for 170,000 francs was approved. Rights of way were abolished in 1930, and ownership was effectively transferred to the department in 1936.

The structure, damaged by the French army in June 1940 following the advance of German troops, was quickly repaired by the occupying forces, who used it for vehicle transit. (Note: The city of Lorient is strategic for occupants who built the Lorient Submarine Base there, which required 15,000 people.) On September 30, 1941, the road and bridge engineer declared the bridge to be in good condition, with no structural damage. After being partially destroyed in 1944, the bridge was repaired in 1945 and completely restored in 1947.

Following the war, the capacity of the structure reached its limits as road traffic grew, and a second bridge was opened in 1974. At first, the original structure remained open to pedestrians only, but was finally closed due to its condition. The deck was dismantled in 1979, with only the two piers remaining.

=== Second bridge ===
Preparations for the new bridge project began in the early 1970s. An initial project was presented to the departmental site commission in January 1972. It envisaged a concrete beam bridge, with a main span of around 200 metres and a length of around 560 metres, located 100 metres downstream of the first bridge. In the end, a bridge of this type was chosen, but located 15 metres upstream of the old bridge.

The bridge was opened on August 4, 1974.

== Characteristics ==
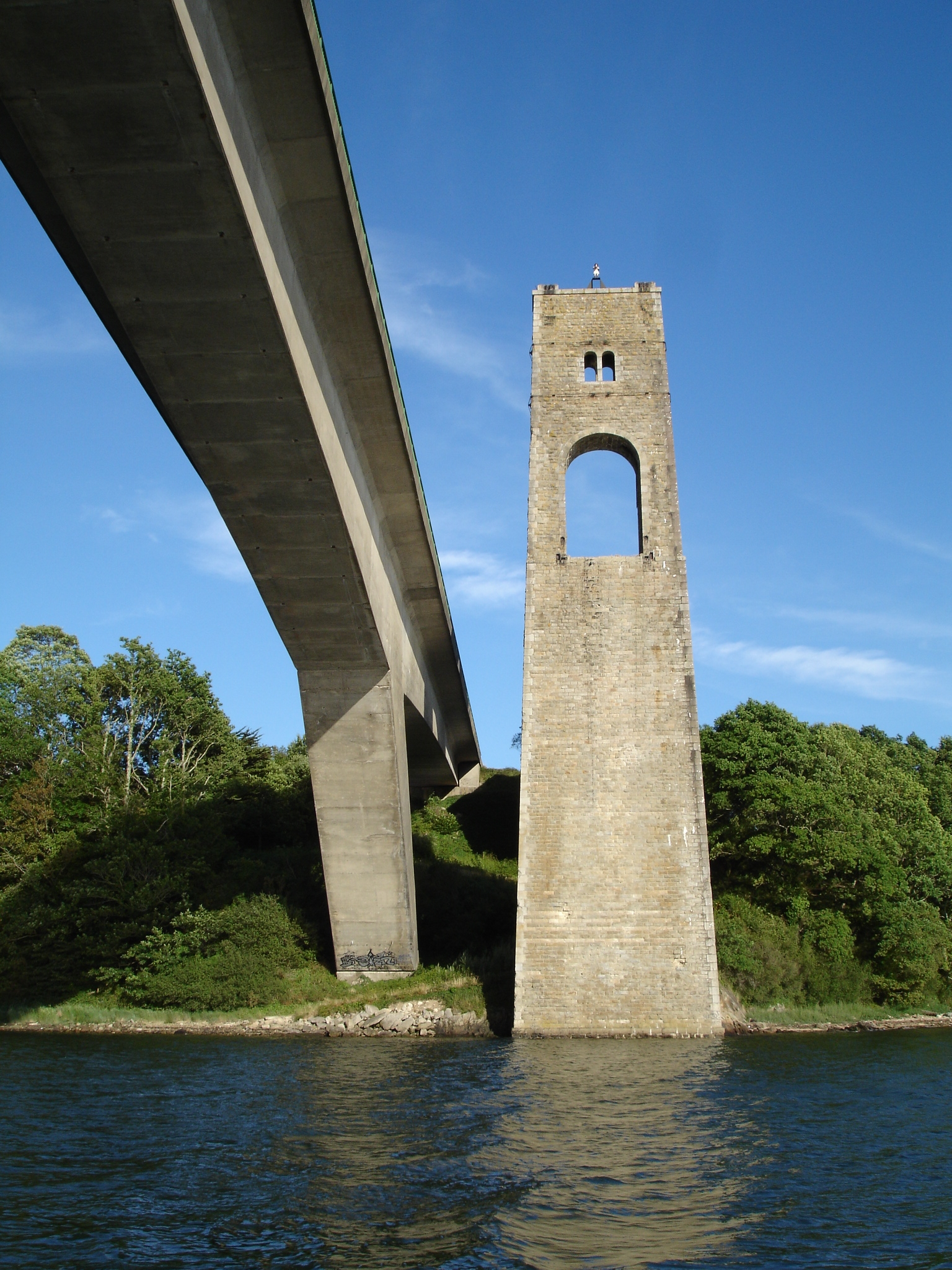
Current Pont du Bonhomme and remainings of the former one.

=== Location ===
The bridge within the Lorient's regional transport network.

This cross-over of the Blavet is located at the junction of two distinct geological zones. Downstream, the area is underlain by micaschists and quaternary sediments, offering little resistance to erosion, and forming a large valley whose banks are bordered by wide mudflats. Upstream, the subsoil is made up of granite, which is more resistant to erosion and has much more deeply incised banks.

=== First bridge ===
The cable-stayed bridge technique is common to many other structures built in Brittany at this time to cross estuaries or rias. The two granite piers are 37 meters high. The bridge is 237 meters long, with a cable-stayed central span of 163 meters. The deck, 4.65 meters wide, is 27 meters above the Blavet river.

The bridge was in operation from 1904 to 1979, and underwent several repair and maintenance operations, mainly in 1941 and again from 1945 to 1947. After being decommissioned and restored by the Conseil Général in 2013, the pier and abutment located on its territory were acquired by the city of Kervignac. The structures on the Lanester side remain unchanged.

=== Second bridge ===
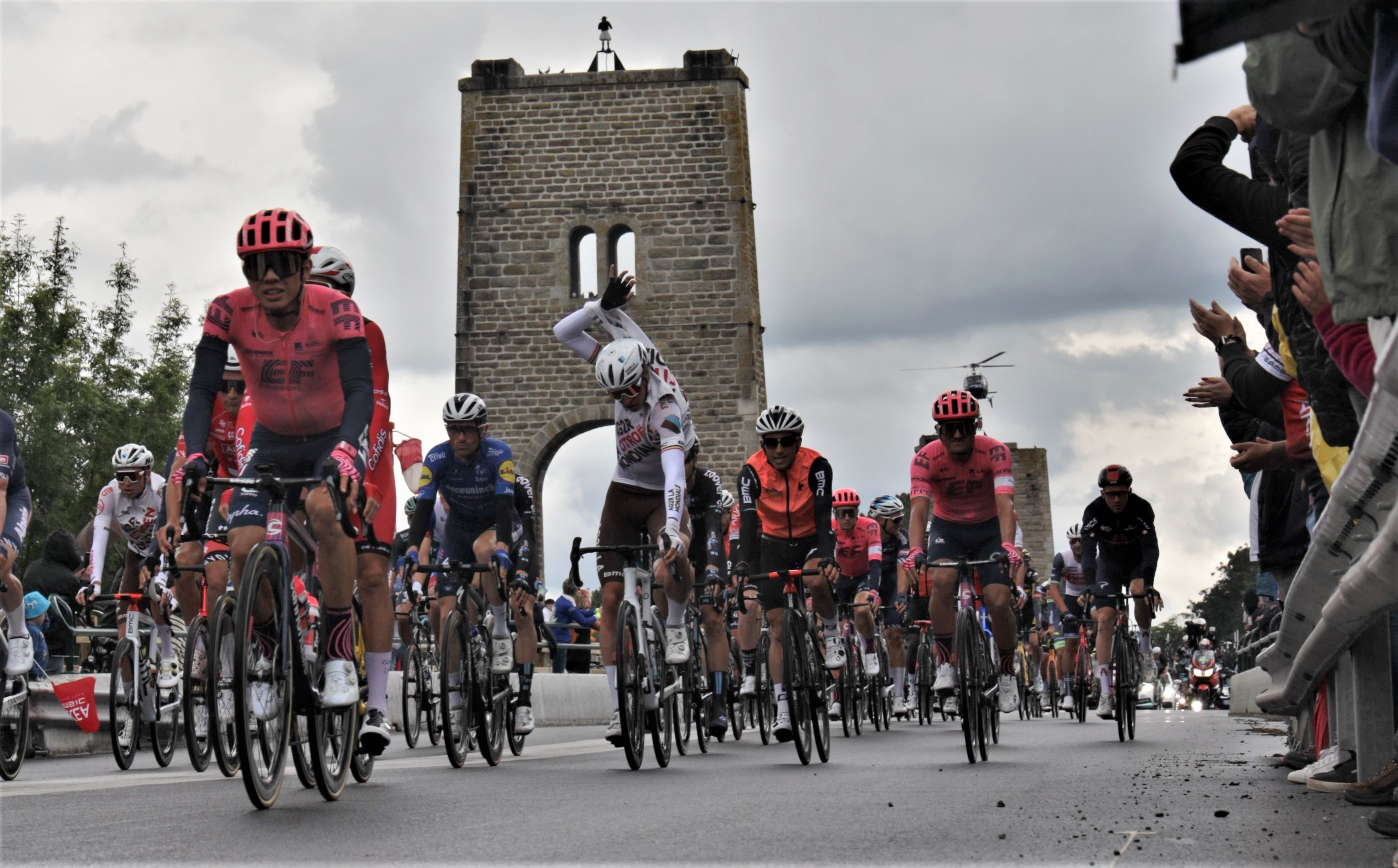
Passing of the 3rd stage of the Tour de France 2021 on Pont du Bonhomme.

The second bridge, designed by Jacques Mathivat and built between 1972 and 1974 by Campenon-Bernard, is a corbel bridge. The deck, made of prestressed concrete, comprises three spans of 67.95 m, 146.70 m and 67.95 m, for a total length of 282.60 m. The piers are made of reinforced concrete. It has been in continuous operation since 1974.

=== Statues ===
The statues on the Pont du Bonhomme were sculpted in polychrome oak by Goanvic. The female figure is on the west side, handing a tobacco box to the male figure on the east side.

In 1905, they were installed at the top of the bridge. One night in 1977, they were stolen and left in front of the building of the newspaper La Liberté du Morbihan. To prevent them from disappearing again, a cast was made in 1995, and the copies were fixed to the pillars of the bridge. The originals are kept at Hennebont Town Hall and are open to the public.

== Appendix ==
=== Bibliography ===
- Yannic Rome, Bacs et ponts en Morbihan, Le Faouët, Liv'Éditions, March 2010, 184 p. (ISBN 978-2-84497-174-6).
- Jacques Guilchet, Hennebont: de l'Empire à la Seconde Guerre mondiale, Imprimerie Le Roux, 1992, 231 p. (ISBN 978-2-9502985-4-6).

=== See also ===
- Gien viaduct
- Suspension bridge
- Kervignac – Lanester
- Blavet
- Crueize Viaduct
- Morlaix viaduct

=== External links ===
- Le pont du Bonhomme on Structurae archive
- Le pont du Bonhomme on Petit-patrimoine.com archive
