= Gwenhael =

Monk and missionary

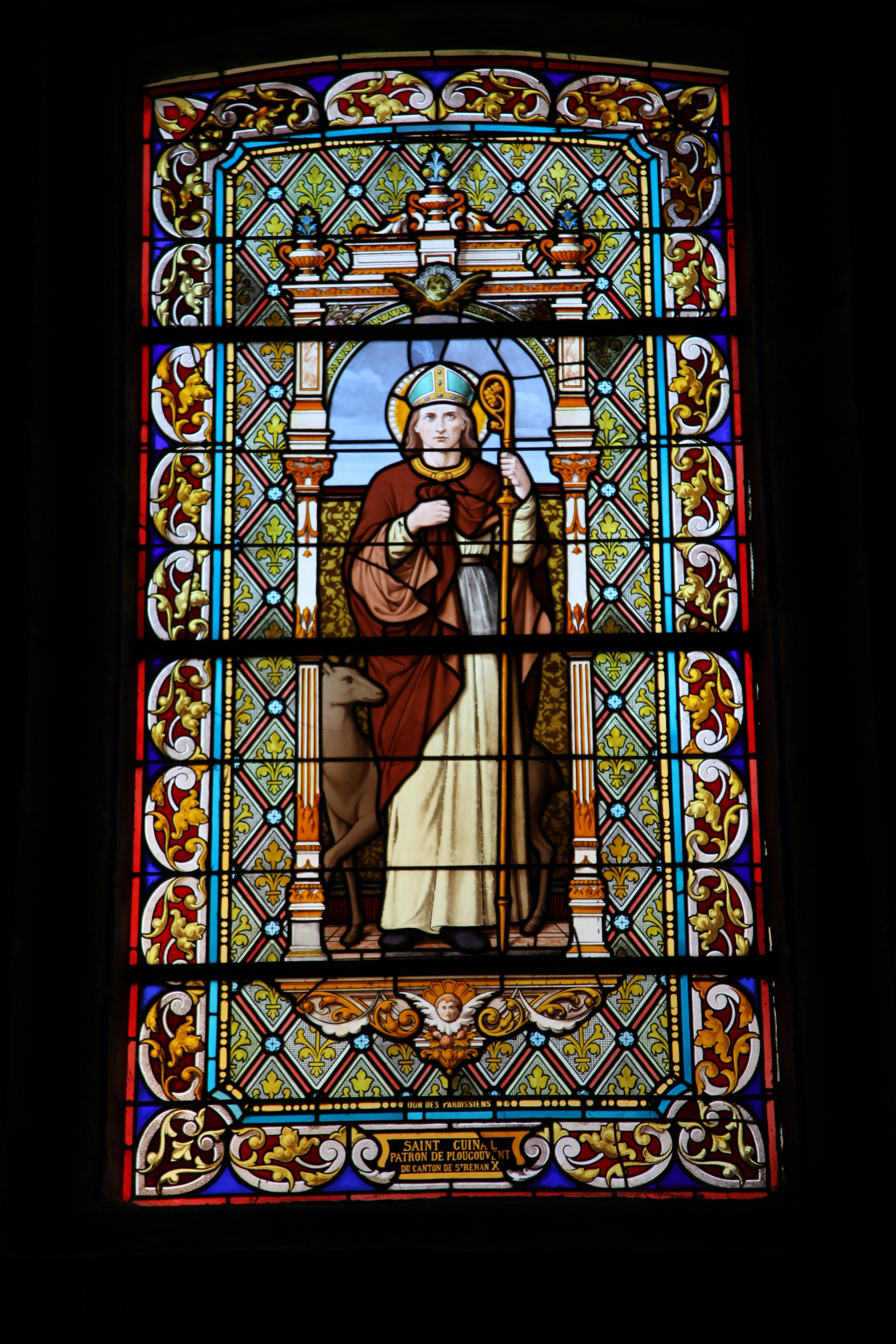
- Saint Gwenhael, Église Notre-Dame-de-Liesse de Saint-Renan
- Born: circa sixth century Ergué-Gabéric (Finistère
- Died: circa 590; Caudan, Brittany, France
- Venerated in: Roman Catholic Church, Eastern Orthodox Church
- Feast: 3 November

Saint Gwenhael (French: Guénaël; Breton: Gwenael; Old Breton: Guenhael) was a Breton saint of the 6th century, born at Ergué-Gabéric (Finistère), the second abbot of Landévennec Abbey, successor in 532 to the founder, Saint Winwaloe (Gwenole). The feast of Saint Gwenaël is 3 November.

== Life ==
His Vita was written in the 9th century.

He is said to have been born in Quimper, at the beginning of the 6th century, although the neighboring parish of Ergué-Gabéric claims him. Intelligent and precocious, his parents sent him to school very early. According to tradition, Winwaloe met Gwenaël in a street in Quimper when he was eleven, and was so convinced of his gifts that he at once obtained permission from Gwenaël's parents for him to study under his direction.

Gwenhael was raised at the monastery of Landevennec, where he became a monk in 511. Having noticed his extraordinary qualities, Winwaloe chose him as his successor. When Gwennolé died in 532, the monks took Gwenhael as abbot. But, after seven years, he resigned, left, with eleven other monks, first for the Channel Islands, then for Brittany, from there to Ireland to study the monastic life practiced there according to the rule of Columbanus. Throughout this journey, he worked to reawaken monastic fervor where relaxation had been introduced; and he founded new monasteries: he founded two or three large ones and reformed around fifty smaller ones.

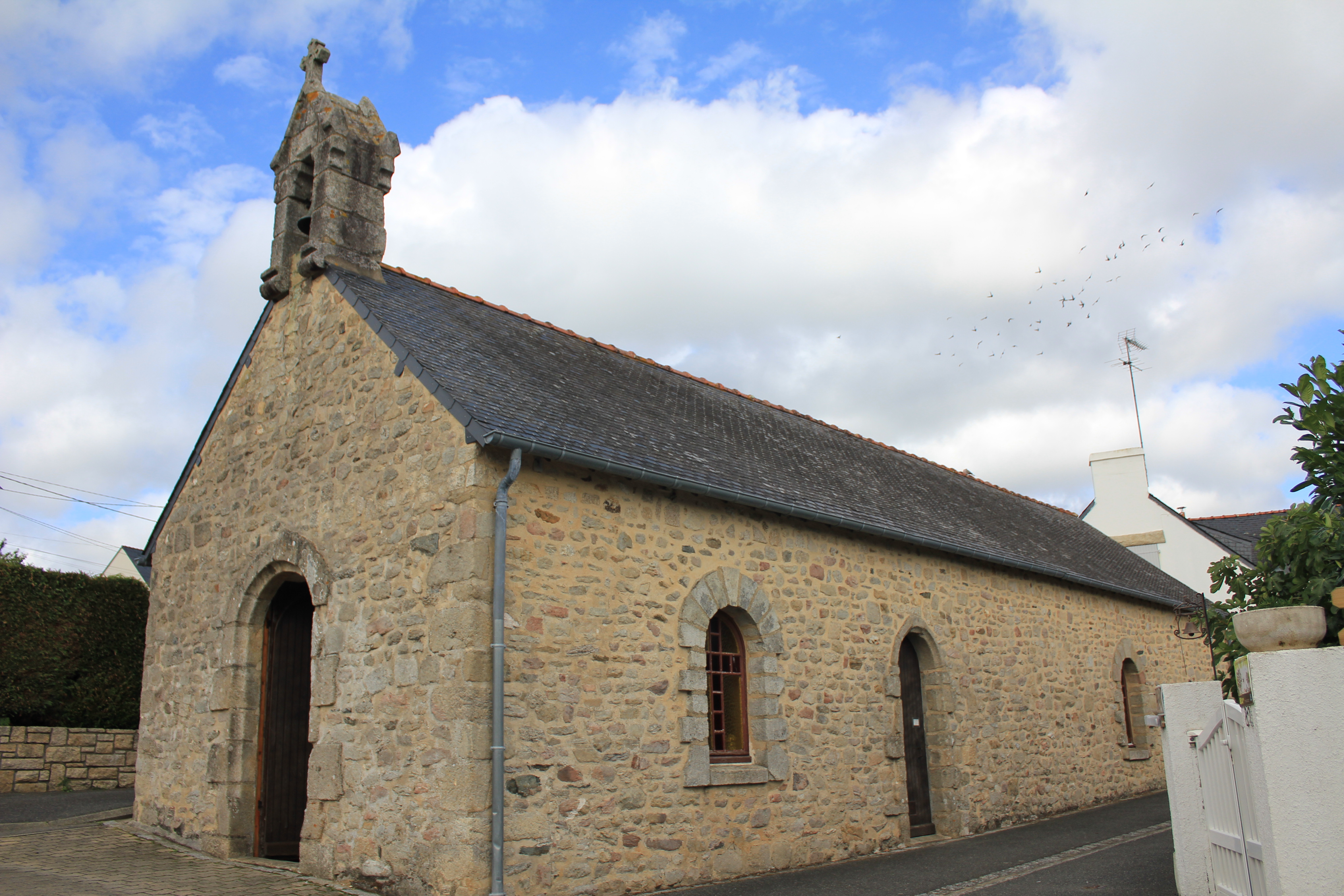
Chapelle Saint-Guénaël de Lanester

Gwenhael remained in Ireland for thirty-four years. He then decided to return to Armorica, embarking, alone according to some, with some fifty companions who did not want to leave him, according to other authors. He probably landed in Armorican Cornwall, founded three monasteries, and considered going to Groix to inspect some small monastic establishments. The bells began to ring of their own accord to announce his visit. He stayed there for a few years, then finally landed on the right bank of the Blavet, where the Saint-Guenaël chapel is today, in Lanester. He is also said to have founded a monastery near Caudan.

His holiness attracted even wild animals, the deer which, pursued, came to seek refuge under his coat. The hunters, amazed, went to tell their master Waroch, Count of Vannes, who came to visit him, trying to persuade him to stay with him at court. Gwenaël, knowing his end is near, wants to prepare for it in solitude. Shortly before his death, faithful to Scoto-Breton custom, he had prescribed that on the anniversary of his death they serve "a feast to the community": the consolatio cibi (comfort through food). He died around 590.

== Veneration ==
His relics were transferred to the Cathédrale Saint-Pierre de Vannes. To save them from the Normans, they were transported, at the end of the 9th century, to Paris, then to Corbeil, where they were burned during the Revolution.

His cult is mostly found in the west of Brittany, as can be established after some deciphering of the various forms his name has taken. The church of Ergué-Gabéric (Finistère) is dedicated to him, under the name of "Saint Guinal". The parish churches of Bolazec, Lescouët-Gouarec, Plougonvelin, and Tréguidel are also dedicated to him. A statue of the saint is also found in the church of Poullaouen.

The saint's name is composed of the Breton elements gwenn "white, fair; blessed" and hael "generous". According to Gwennole Le Menn, the saint's name is to be found in a number of placenames, including Locunel in Caudan, Saint-Guinel in Mauron, Saint-Guénal and Saint-Vinnel in Poullaouen, Lanvenaël in Plomeur, Saint-Vénal and Saint-Guénal in Landivisiau and Saint-Vénal in Saint-Pol-de-Léon. Kervénal also occurs three times, in Côtes-d'Armor, Finistère and Morbihan.

The surnames Guénal, Guénel, Trévinal and Kervennal doubtless have a connection with this saint's name, either directly or through a place name, such as the examples above.
