= Gien (disambiguation) =

Gien is a commune and town in the Loiret department of France.

Gien may also refer to:

== Associated with the Loiret commune ==
- AS Gien, a football club in the town
- Canton of Gien, an administrative division based on the commune
- Château de Gien, 15th century manor house
- Gien station, a railway station
- Gien viaduct, a railway viaduct

== People ==
- Anna Gien (born 1991), German writer and columnist
- Gien, a monk involved in a dispute over Sōtō Zen Buddhism; see sandai sōron
- Gien de Kock (1908–1998), Dutch javelin thrower
- Gien van Maanen (1936–2023), Dutch handball and football player

== Other meanings ==
- Gien-sur-Cure, commune in the Nièvre department of France
