= Gien viaduct =

Railway bridge in Loiret

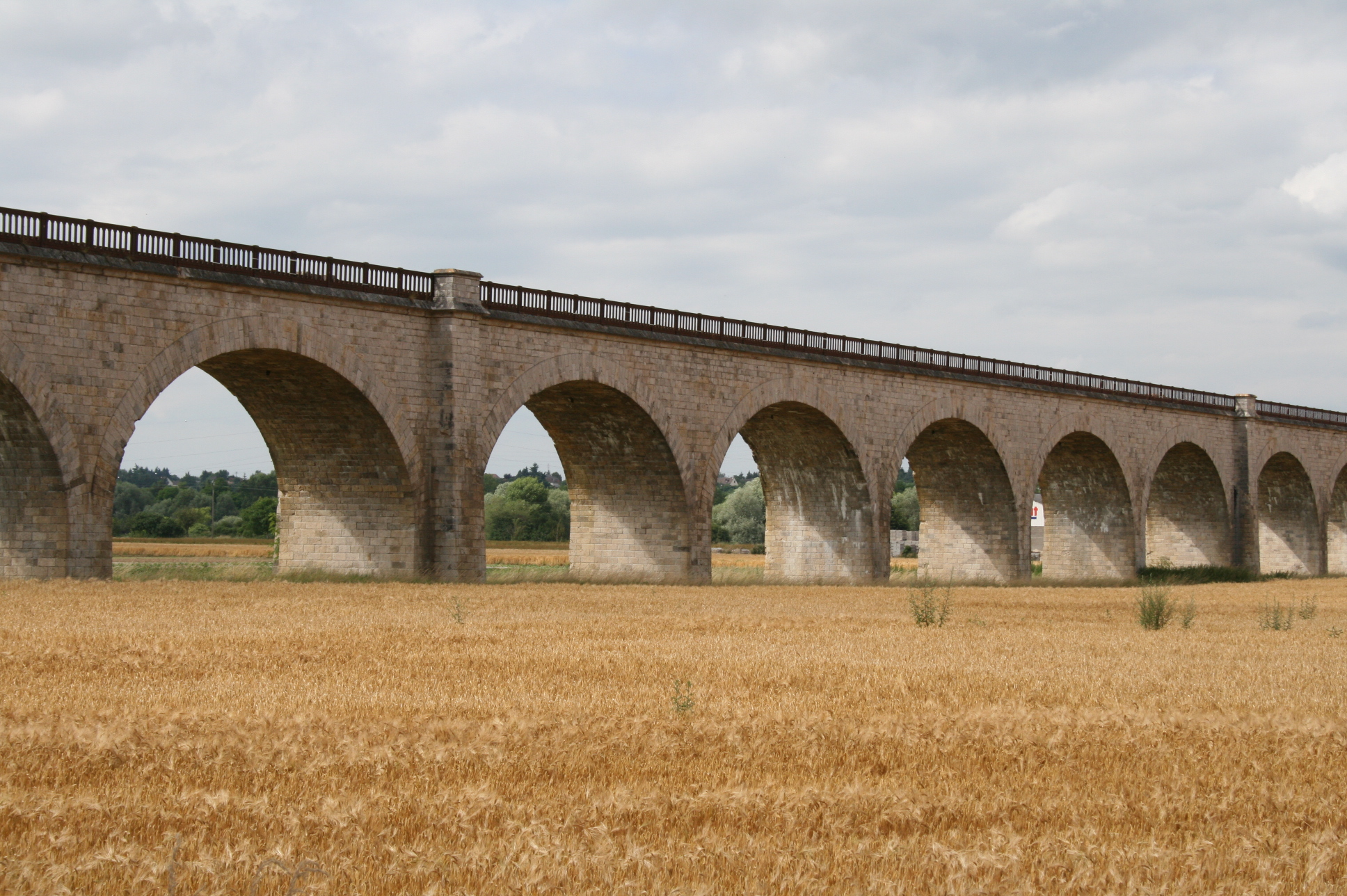
- Gien viaduct
- Coordinates: 47°41′N 2°37′E
- Locale: Loiret, Centre-Val de Loire, France

Characteristics
- Total length: 1 832,20 m
- Width: 7 m

Location
- Interactive map of Gien viaduct

The Gien viaduct is a railway bridge crossing the Loire at Gien in the Loiret and the Centre-Val de Loire region. It was part of the Gien - Argent railway line of which today only the Gien - Poilly-lez-Gien section is still in service, for the transport of goods.

With a total length of 1,832,20 meters, it is in fact made up of three structures: a masonry viaduct on the left bank with an opening of 1,198,20 meters, a truss bridge crossing the Loire with a length of 361 meters, and a masonry viaduct on the right bank with an opening of 273 meters.

At the time of its construction, this structure was one of the three longest structures in the world.

== Geography ==
The bridge connects the towns of Gien, on the right bank of the Loire, and Poilly-lez-Gien on the left bank. It is used by a railway line which begins in the southern part of the territory of the commune of Poilly-lez-Gien, along the departmental road 956 known as the Coullons route, and joins the Gien station.

From south to north, the bridge begins along the Rue du Puit Rotant then spans the departmental road 951, known as the Route de Gien, the Rue des Iris, the Loire, the Chemin du Val, the Rue des Fourches and the Rue de la Poumet.

On the Loire, the bridge is located upstream of the Sully-sur-Loire bridge and downstream of the old Gien bridge.

== History ==
=== 1878-1888: route studies ===
The line from Bourges to Gien, started by the railway company from Bourges to Gien and from Argent-sur-Sauldre to Beaune-la-Rolande, was bought by the State, under the law of August 3, 1881, following the liquidation of this Company, then granted to the Compagnie du chemin de fer de Paris à Orléans, under the conditions set out in the agreement of June 28, 1883.

At the time of the takeover, the earthworks and engineering structures were already very advanced. The section between Bourges and Argent-sur-Sauldre was able to be delivered to operation on June 15, 1885, the infrastructure work on the rest of the line was then almost completed up to a few kilometers from Gien, but the difficulties presented by the crossing of the Loire at Gien, had delayed the studies of this part of the route so much that the project was not yet approved.

In this place the river is not dammed, and, unless we lay the track at ground level over the entire left bank valley and resign ourselves to seeing it submerge frequently over more than a kilometer in length, it was necessary to plan for the crossing of the entire valley a viaduct of exceptional length.

==== Route no. 1 south-east of Gien ====
Due to the exorbitant cost of the project, the former Company still preferred to establish a submersible crossing despite the inconveniences that would have resulted for operation.

Different routes, on the background of the 1893 plan.

This crossing was made upstream of the town of Gien by means of a metal bridge 300 or 400 meters wide depending on the variants proposed. The lower part of the bridge deck was only placed 1,50 meters above the highest water, the rail was only at the level 133,40, or approximately 30 meters below the plateau steep hill on which the Gien station is located. This bridge was accessed from the south side by means of a 0.015 slope embankment. Once the viaduct was crossed, the railway line was to join the Paris - Clermont-Ferrand line at Gien station, passing through a 415 meter long tunnel. Another variation of this project proposed two tunnels of 175 and 495 meters long to go up to the plateau.

The ministerial decision of July 23, 1878, however, invited the Company to examine whether it would not be preferable to raise the bridge deck further, and to provide a certain number of relief arches in the access ramp.

==== Route no. 2 northwest of Gien ====
The solutions presented did not in any way satisfy Mr. des Orgeries, chief engineer, nor Mr. Pochet, ordinary control engineer. They studied another solution consisting of transferring the route downstream of the city by raising the platform to level 136,80 at the level of the crossing of the Loire. for crossing the river two solutions were proposed, either by a masonry viaduct 1,320 meters long, so as to make the route completely unsinkable, or by a submersible route, an embankment 200 meters long followed by a viaduct 300 meters.

At the same time the State entered into negotiations to buy the line, the Company's proposals were definitively rejected and the engineers were invited to study a preliminary project on the basis they had proposed (ministerial decision of October 31, 1879). Following this study, the submersible route was definitively abandoned; but on the other hand it was decided, to reduce expenses, to only build the line with one track in the entire part remaining to be executed.

The preliminary project presented included, on the left bank valley, a masonry viaduct 1,230 meters long and composed of 96 arches with an opening of 11 meters, to cross the Loire, a metal bridge with seven spans of 386 meters in total length, and, on the right bank, an embankment with no openings other than the works necessary for the railway crossings.

The level of the platform on the metal deck was still only at the level 134,30, but the embankment following it was, for 140 meters, at a slope of 0,01, and for the rest of the length, ramped by 0.016. The maximum depth of the trench opened in the hillside on the right bank nevertheless exceeded 13 meters.

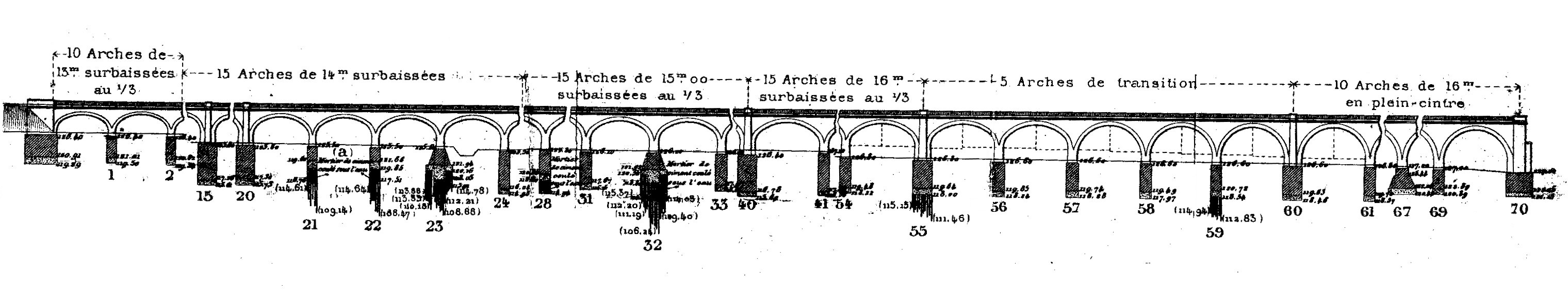
General elevation of the viaduct on the left bank.

It was planned that the left bank valley viaduct and the abutments of the metal bridge would be founded on gravel at an average depth of 3,70 meters, and that the piers of the bridge over the Loire would be founded on masses of concrete poured under the water, after dredging of the scourable land, in enclosures defended by riprap.

This preliminary project was approved by ministerial decision of April 17, 1882, subject to new studies being carried out to ensure the resistance of the marls, on which the bridge over the Loire was to be founded, to the corrosion of currents and to compressibility. The general provisions adopted by this decision were no longer to be significantly modified with regard to the route.

For the record, a variant, called Pisserate, was presented in the same years, in which the crossing of the Loire was postponed more than two kilometers downstream from the town. This move resulted in a considerable lengthening of the route, and was only motivated by the fear of encountering insurmountable difficulties in the execution of the 13 meter deep trench.

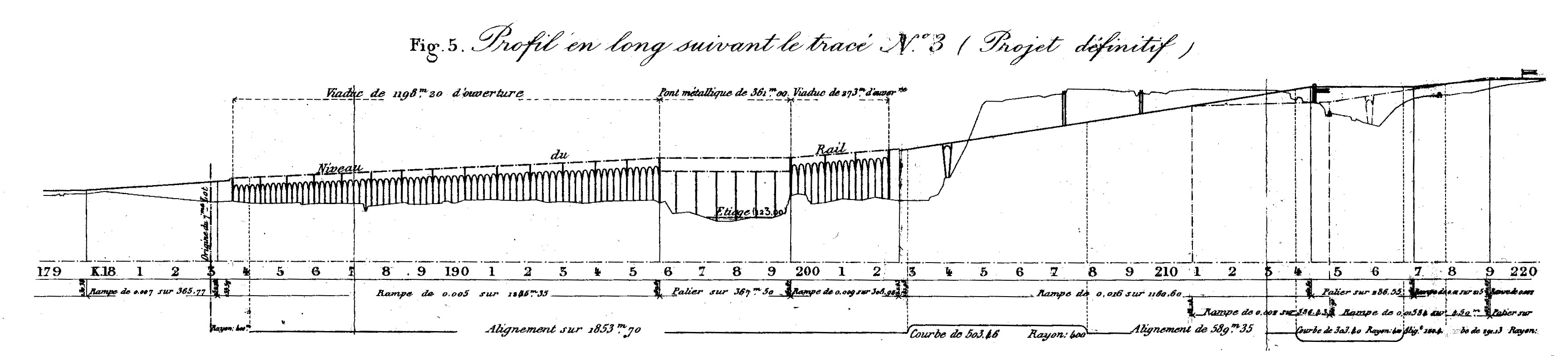
General long profile of the final project.

==== Final route: a new viaduct on the right bank ====
In the final project the line at the crossing of the Loire was finally raised to the level 139,67, which corresponds to a platform level of 139,17, more than 5 meters higher than that of the preliminary draft. We only had a trench of a maximum depth of 10.20 meters to avoid the geological layer that we feared to damage.

As a consequence of this increase, the quantity of available excavation was considerably reduced, the height of the valley embankment was also increased, and it was possible, without any notable difference in the amount of expenditure, to introduce a viaduct of 300 m on the right bank. meters in length.

This provided, on this side, an important outlet for flood waters. This outlet, considered superfluous by the Loire service, due to the layout of the premises, gave satisfaction to the inhabitants of the town of Gien who feared the consequences that could have had, on the flow of flood waters, the existence a short distance away, downstream of the town, of an enormous embankment forming a dam across the entire width of the right bank valley. Finally, the entire route was moved slightly downstream, in order to avoid the very expensive expropriations brought about by the proximity of a large industrial installation.

In the meantime, we had carried out, near the right bank of the Loire, the additional experiments prescribed on the resistance of the marl, and we had noted that this land presented all guarantees from the point of view of resistance to scour and to compressibility.

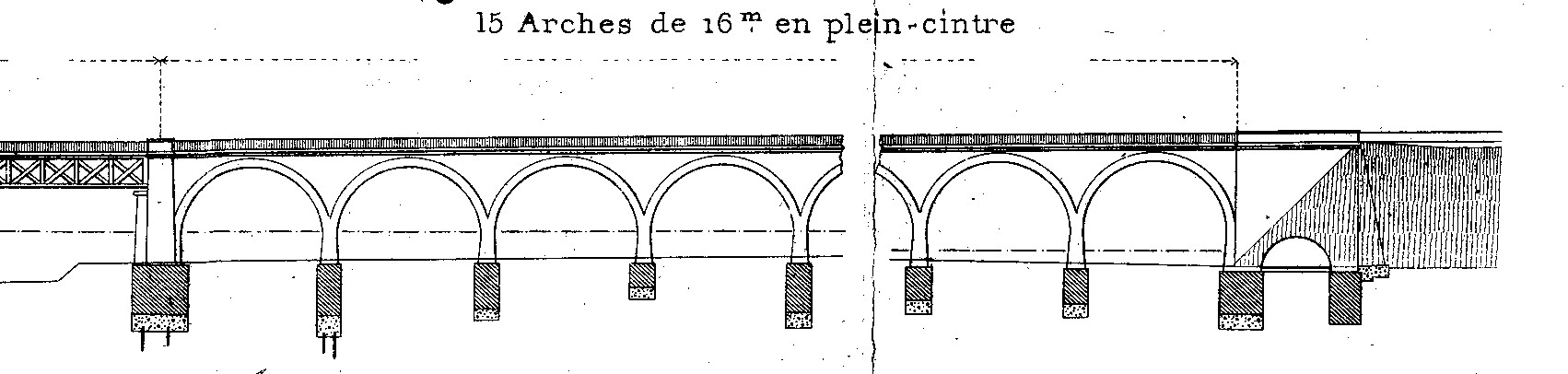
Elevation of the viaduct on the right bank.

=== 1888-1893: the works ===
This project was approved by ministerial decision of November 11, 1886. Following the parcel survey, and at the request of the municipal council of Gien, it underwent a slight rearrangement, with a view to accommodating, in the neighboring part of the station, the passage of an access avenue planned by the city. This modification was approved by ministerial decision of April 27, 1887.

The total expenditure was estimated at 3,241,000 French francs, broken down into 937,000 francs for the acquisition of land, 2,500,000 francs for earthworks and masonry and 604,000 francs for the metal deck of the bridge over the Loire.

Surveys were therefore made at the beginning of 1887 and confirmed those carried out for studies in 1881 with regard to the thickness of the layers of land, but they revealed a water table higher than expected. It was then decided to strengthen the foundations in a more significant way. This had the effect of bringing the estimate of the earthworks to 2,630,000 francs and the total cost to 3,371,000 francs.

The work was awarded on August 13, 1887 and the foundations of the right bank viaduct were started at the beginning of 1888. The foundations of the right bank viaduct presented no difficulty. Those of the left bank viaduct were more difficult to carry out because the compact marl was much deeper and its consistency was variable.

== Features ==
The structure as a whole has a length of 1,832.20 meters. Three structures make it up: a masonry viaduct on the left bank with an opening of 1,198.20 meters, a truss girder bridge crossing the Loire, with a length of 361 meters, and a masonry viaduct on the right bank of 273 opening meters.

=== Left bank viaduct ===
There was long hesitation over the solution to adopt for the opening and shape of the arches. It was not easy to give the entire structure a satisfactory appearance due to the considerable difference in height of its two ends (6 meters originally and 12 meters at the abutment of the metal bridge).

The arrangements definitively adopted consist of semi-circular arches with an opening of 16 meters as long as the available height allows it, then we move, via transition arches, to vaults of the same opening lowered by about a third, then successively with lowered vaults of 15, 14 and 13 meters opening.

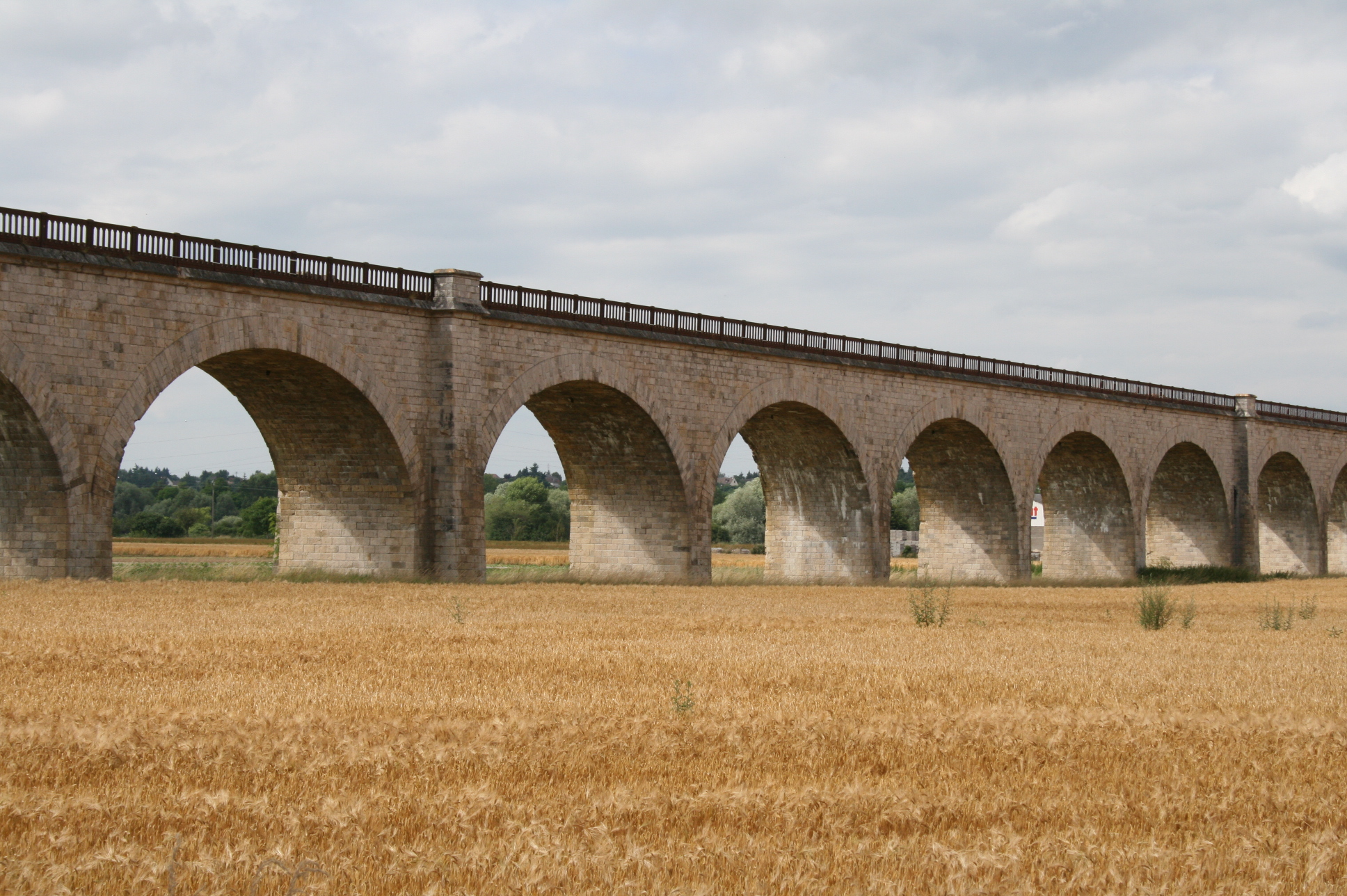
The lowered arches of the viaduct on the left bank.

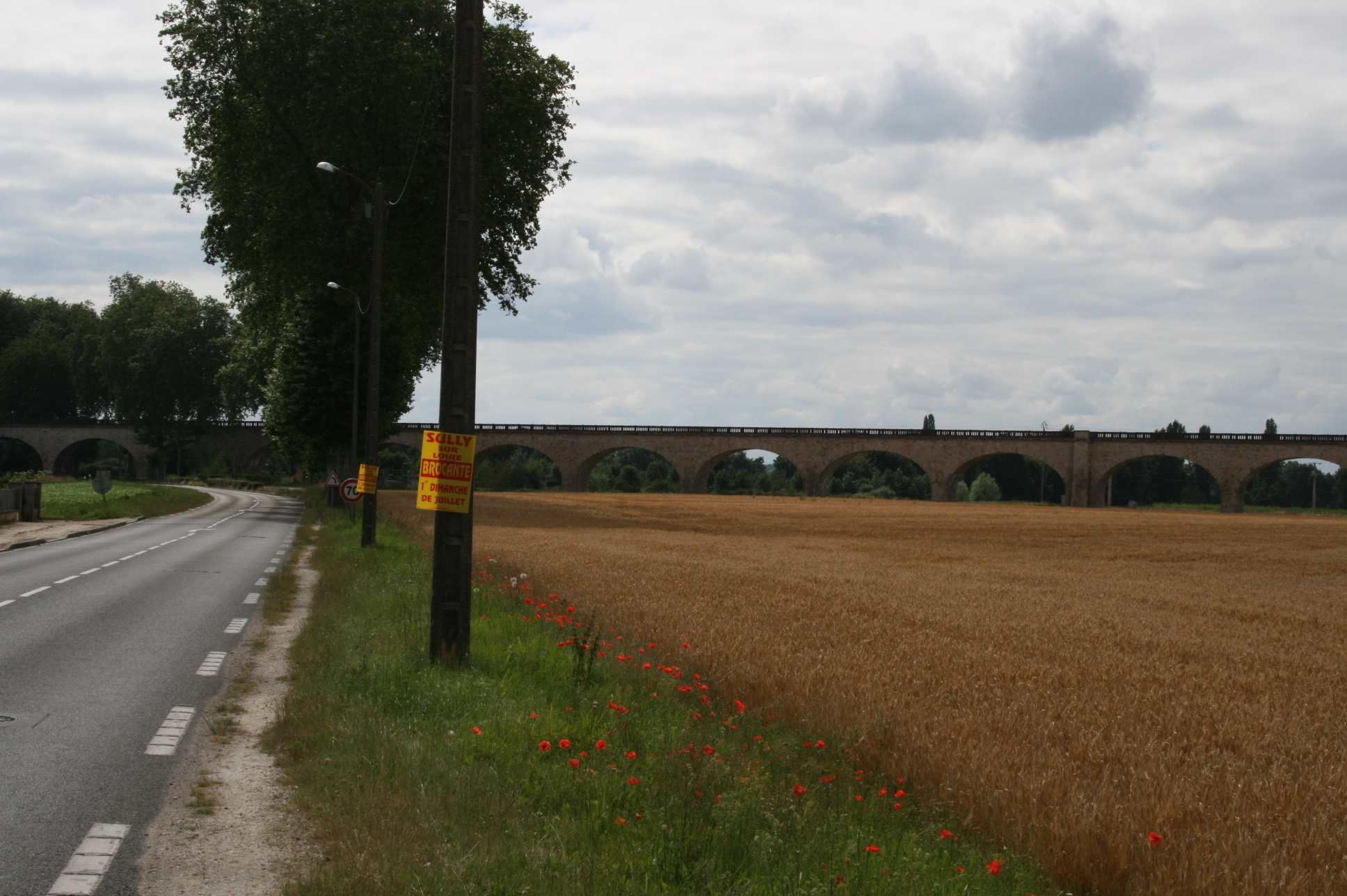
The viaduct crossing the RD 951 on the left bank.

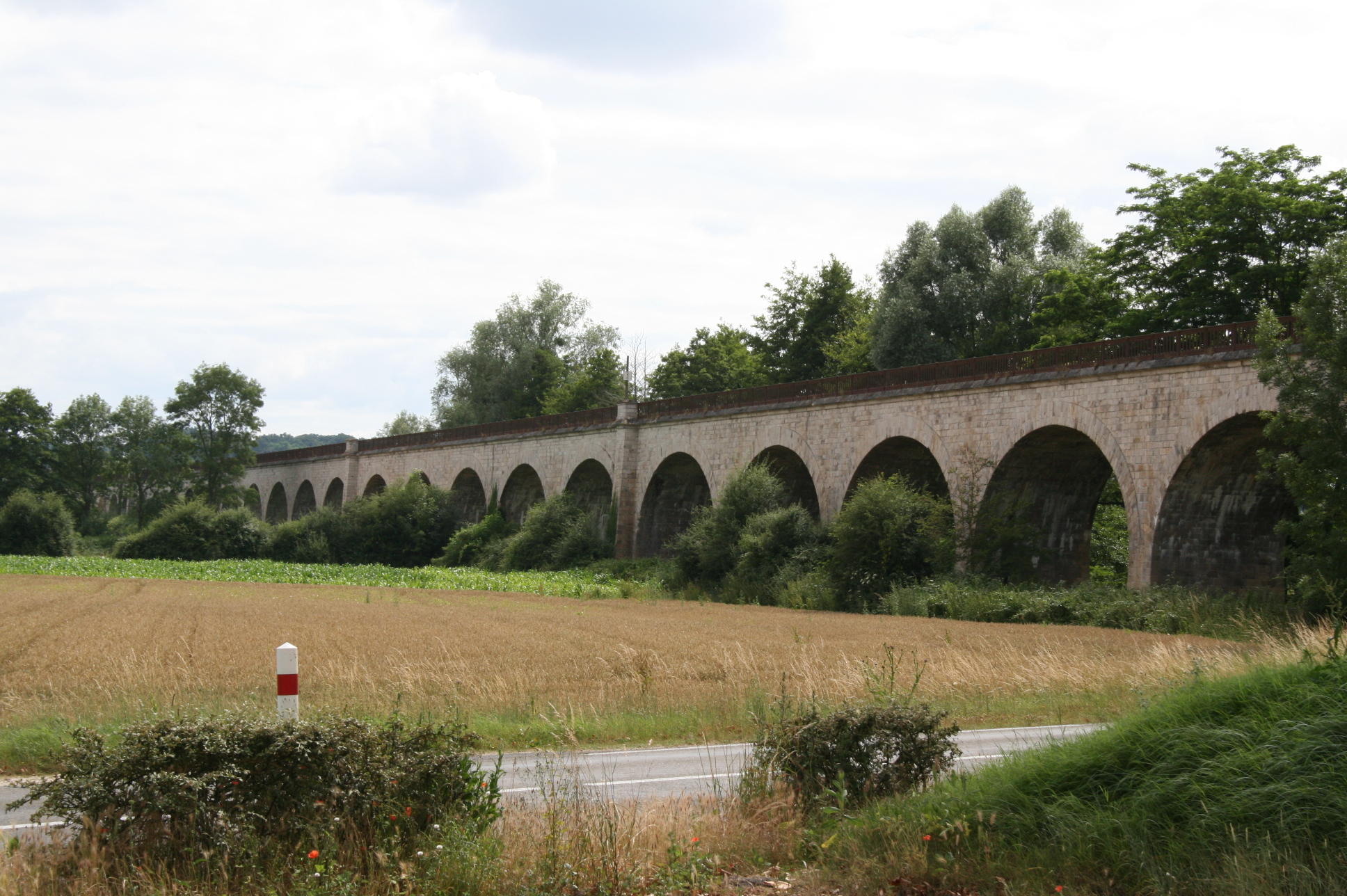
Part of the viaduct south of the RD 951.

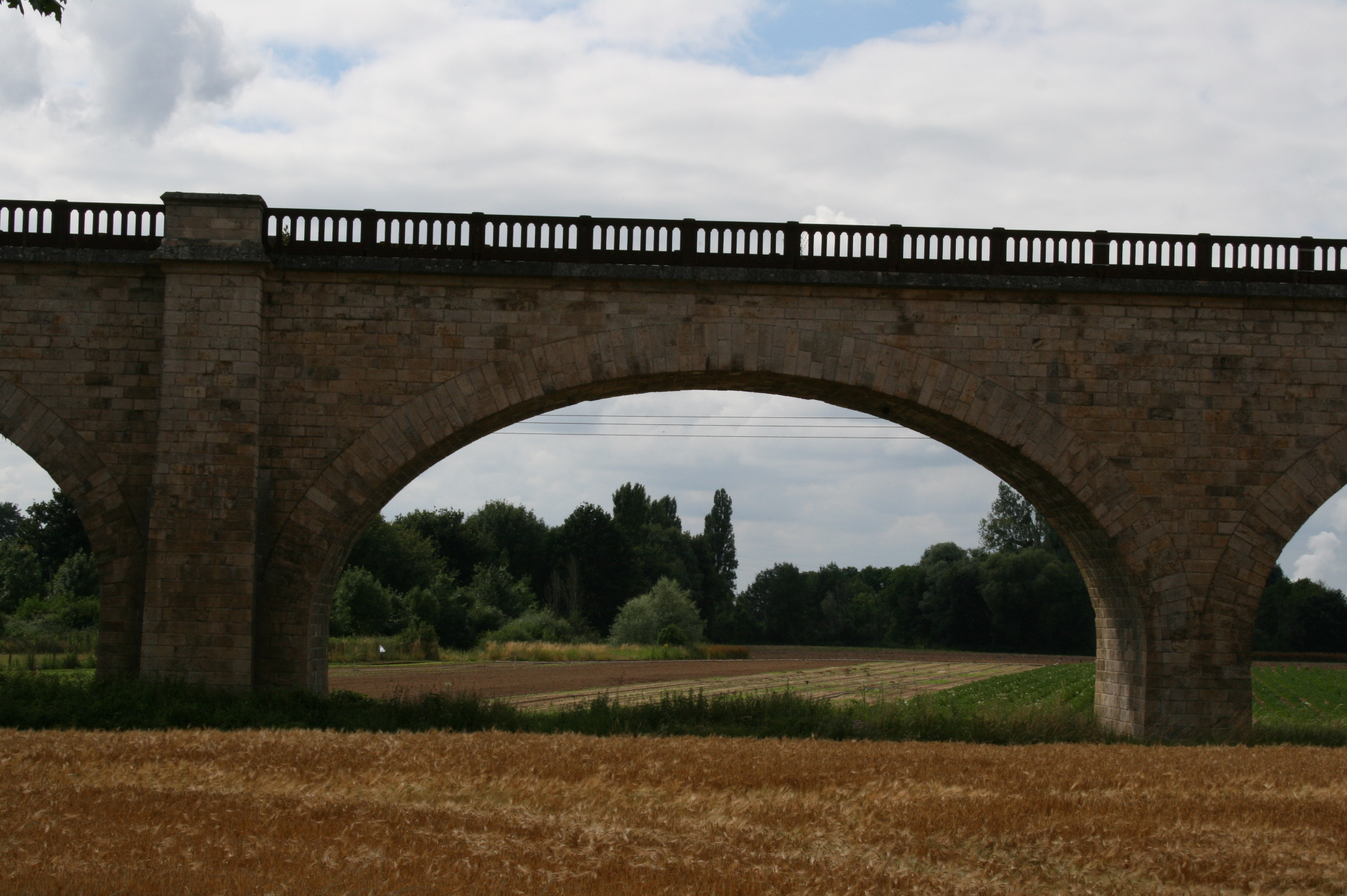
Low arch, noticeably basket handle.

=== Metal bridge ===
The bridge crossing the Loire is a Pratt-type metal truss bridge, 361 meters long.

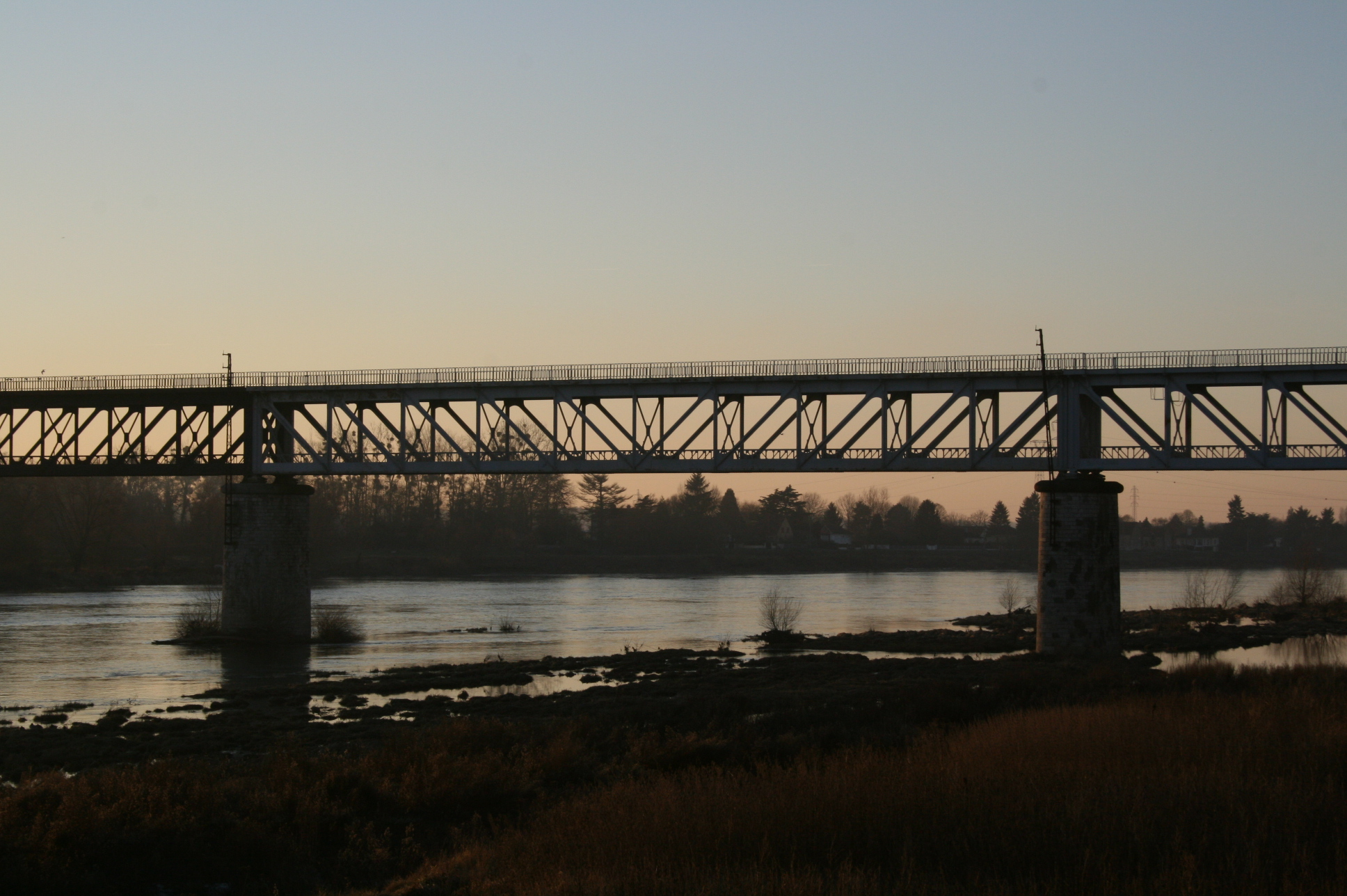
Full span, with classic Pratt type layout (diagonals symmetrical to the middle of the span).

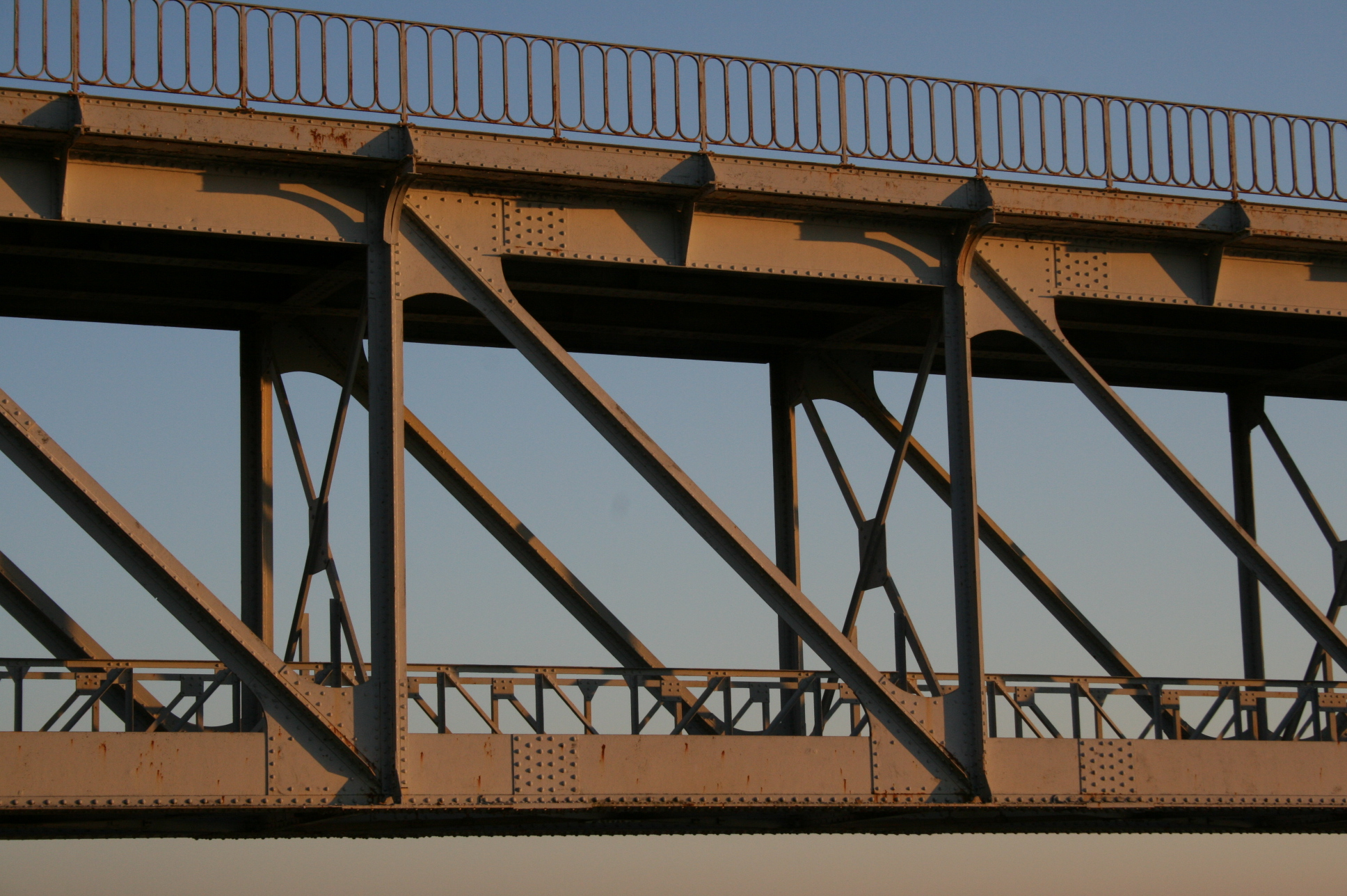
Close-up view of the trellis assembly.

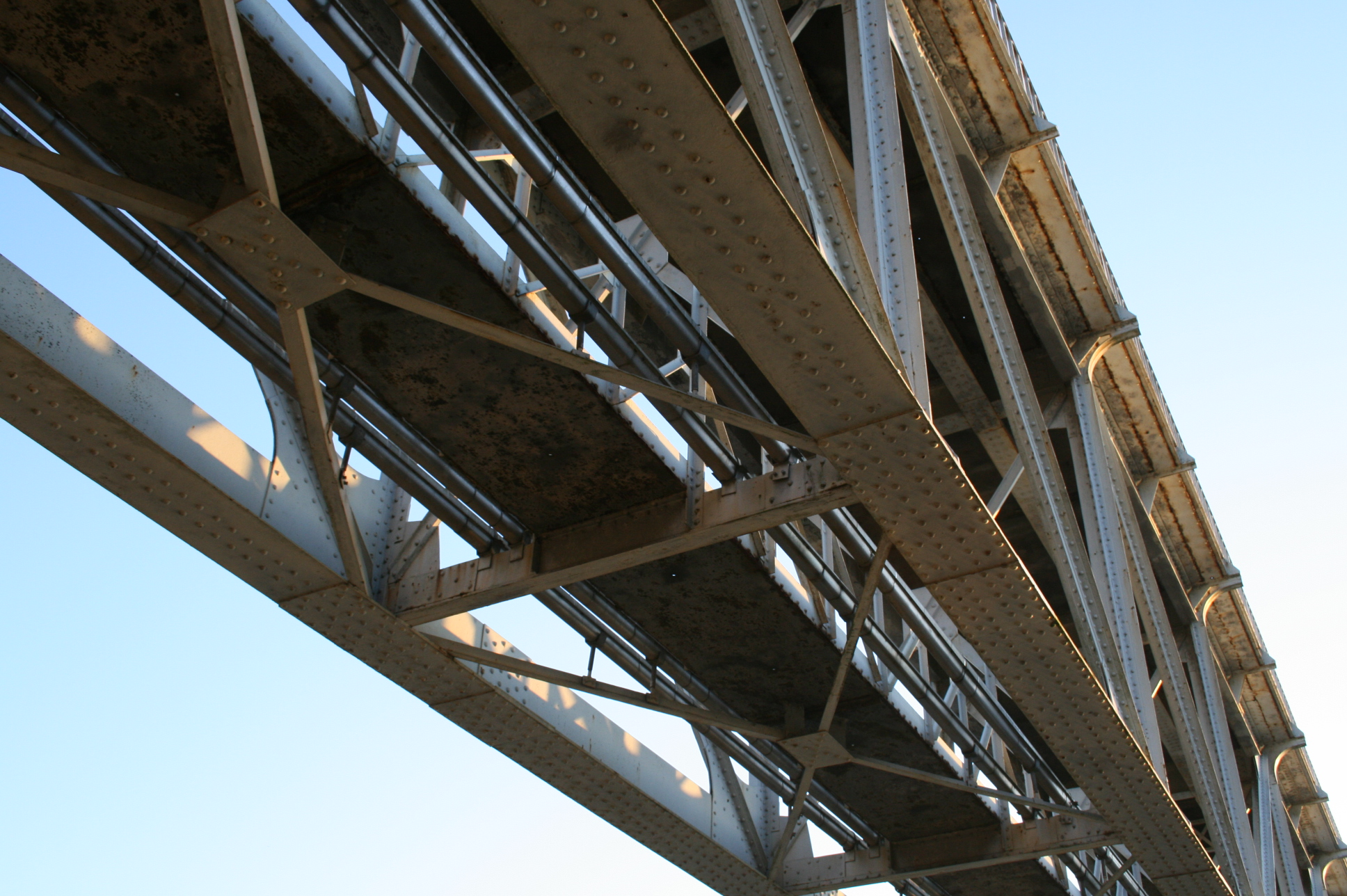
View from below allowing you to see the connection of the two lattice beams.

=== Right bank viaduct ===
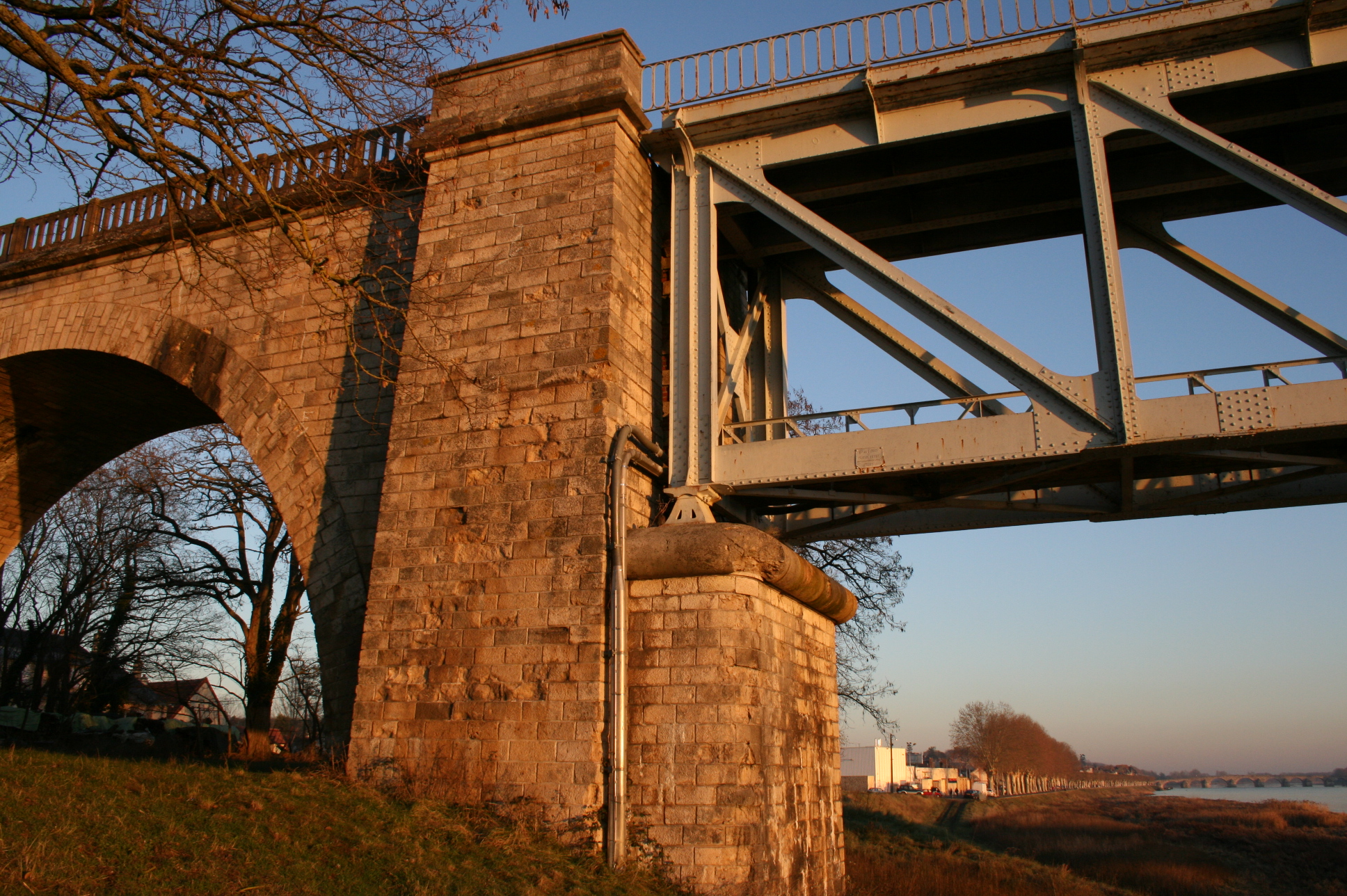
Abutment on the right bank.

The arches of the viaduct on the right bank have a very large opening compared to the height chosen, because it was anticipated that the foundations would be quite expensive. So they have an average opening of 18 meters.

== See also ==
- Crueize Viaduct
- List of longest bridges
- Morlaix viaduct
- Pont du Bonhomme
- Suspension bridge

== Bibliography ==
- Vannier, Serge (2005). Les ponts de la Loire. De sa source à l'Atlantique (in French). CPE éditions.
- D'une rive à l'autre (in French). Musée de la marine de Loire. ISBN 978-2-9515602-1-5.
