= Hôtel de Ville, Lanester =

Town hall in Lanester, France

Hôtel de Ville
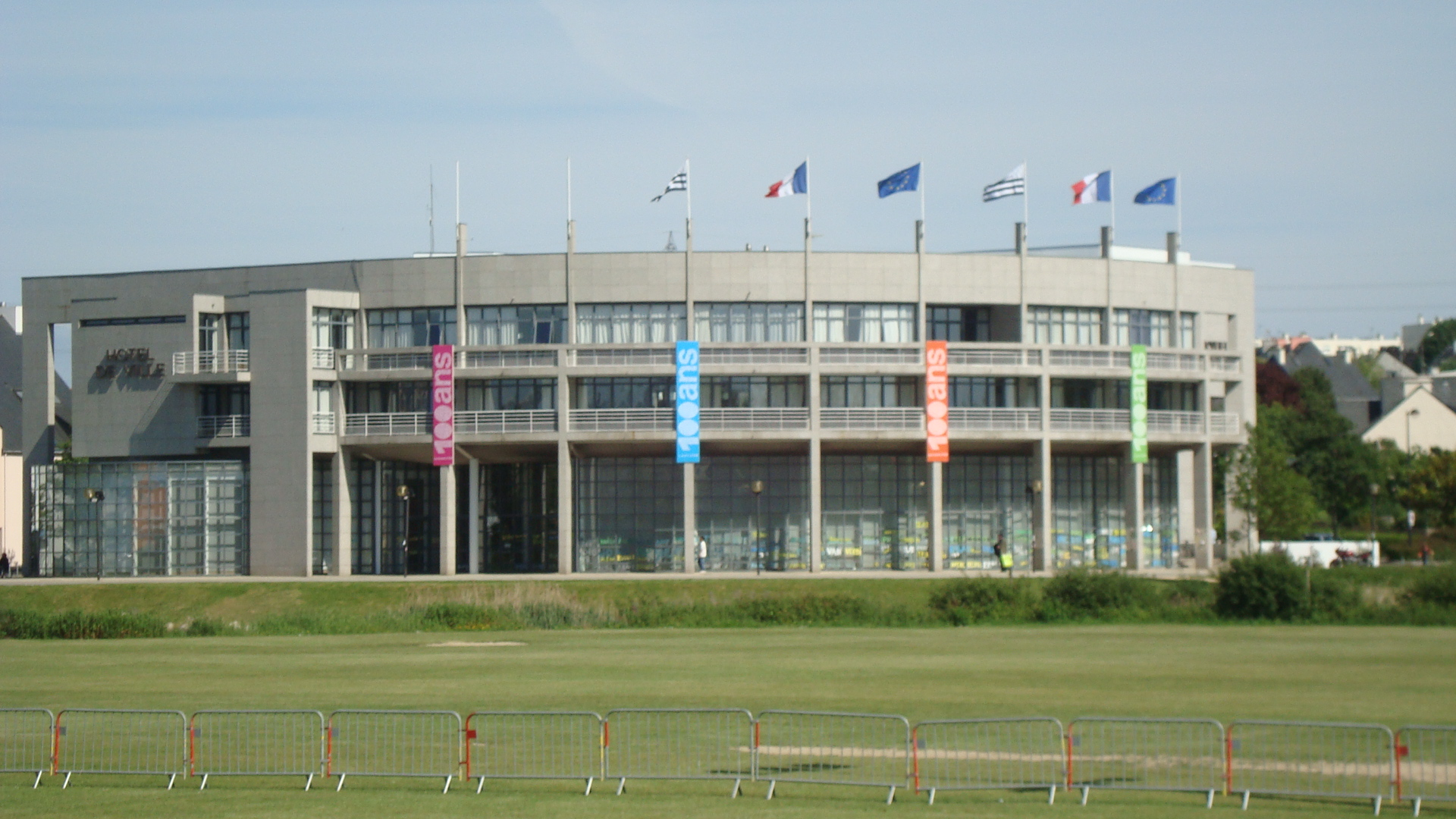
- The main frontage of the Hôtel de Ville in May 2009
- Interactive map of the Hôtel de Ville area

General information
- Type: City hall
- Architectural style: Modern style
- Location: Lanester, France
- Coordinates: 47.7635°N 3.3473°W
- Completed: 1992

Design and construction
- Architect: Jacques David-Lena

The Hôtel de Ville (French pronunciation: [otɛl də vil], City Hall) is a municipal building in Lanester, Morbihan in northwestern France, standing on Rue Louis Aragon.

== History ==
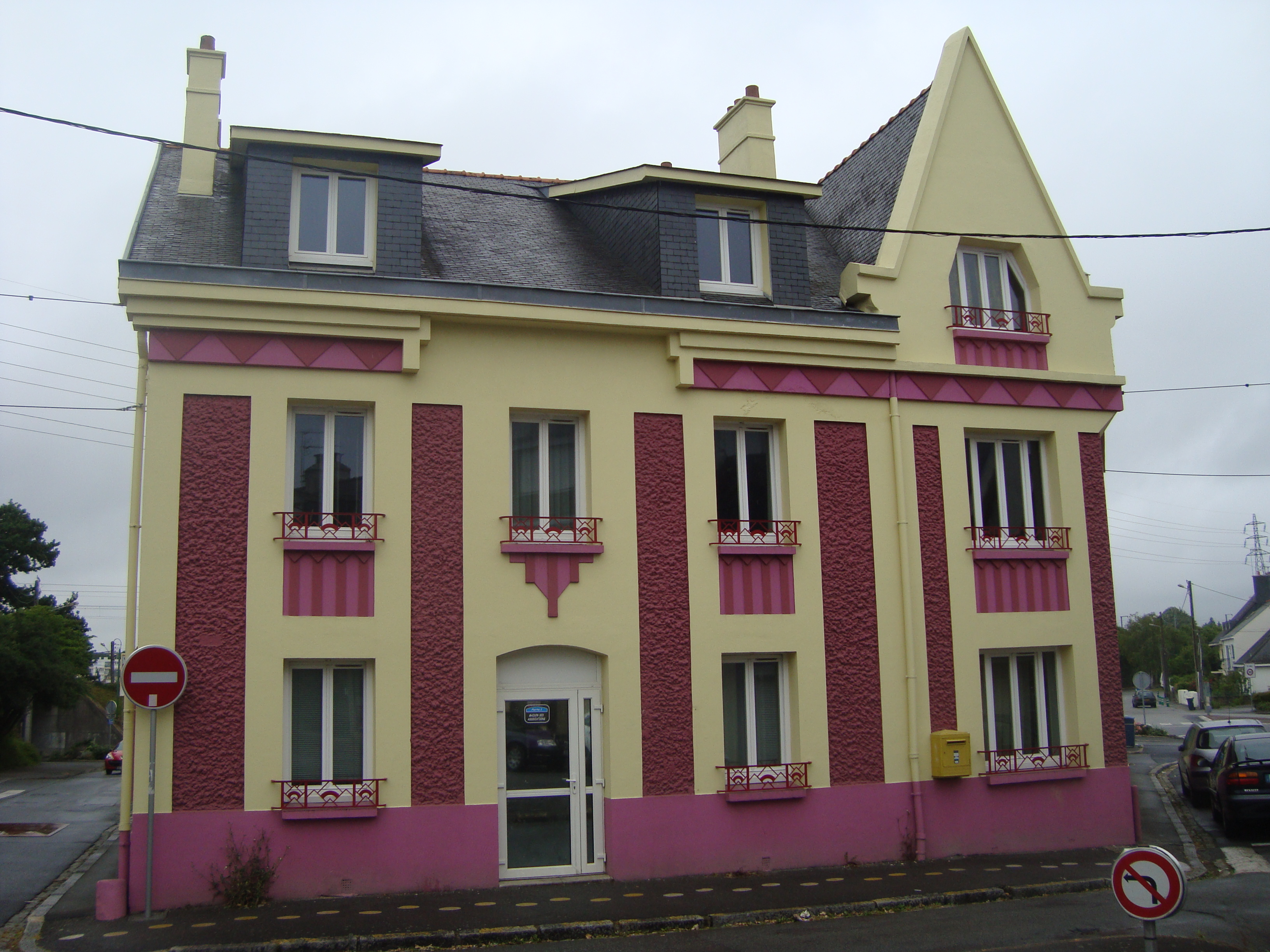
The old town hall on Place Penverne

After the commune of Lanester was created by detaching parts of Caudan in February 1909, the new council led by the mayor, Jean-Marie Le Halpert, looked for a place in which to hold meetings. They initially rented two rooms at No. 2 Rue Jules-Guesde but, in 1921, under a new mayor, Pierre Rogel, they acquired a building on Place Penverne. In 1933, following a significant increase in population, the building was remodelled. The design involved an asymmetrical main frontage of four bays facing onto the street. There was a segmental-headed doorway in the second bay and a gable over the right-hand bay. The rest of the building was fenestrated by casement windows on both floors. Internally, the principal rooms were the Bureau du Maire (mayor's parlour), the Salle de Délibération (council chamber) and the Salle d'Archives (archives room).

On 12 August 1944, during the Second World War, the town hall staff and most of the population of the town were evacuated on the orders of allied commanders, as German forces continued to occupy the shipyards. The town was only liberated by allied forces on 10 May 1945. After the building was no longer need for municipal use, it served as a community centre.

After the war further municipal offices were established around the town to accommodate the growing number of council staff, but in the late 1980s, the council, led by the mayor, Jean Maurice, decided to collocate all staff in a purpose-built town hall. The site they selected was former marshland, which had been reclaimed to create a new town centre, formed to bring together the districts of Les Chantiers (to the south) and Kerentrech (to the north).

Construction work on the new building started in 1990. It was designed by Jacques David-Lena in the modern style, built in concrete and glass and was completed in 1992. The design involved a curved main frontage facing northwest onto a large park (now Parc Nelson Mandela). The façade featured verandas supported by piers at second and third floor levels and a parapet above: the frontage was clad in granite tiles. There were also masts at roof level recalling the maritime history of the town. Internally, the principal rooms were the Hall d'Accueil (reception hall) in the centre of the building, and the Salle du Conseil (council chamber), which featured a council table in the form off a sail.

A new footbridge, costing €220,000, was installed across a lake, thereby linking the town hall to Parc Nelson Mandela, in December 2018.
