= Canton of Lanester =

Coordinates: 47.77°N 3.34°W

The canton of Lanester is an administrative division of the Morbihan department, northwestern France. Its borders were modified at the French canton reorganisation which came into effect in March 2015. Its seat is in Lanester.

It consists of the following communes:

1. Caudan
2. Lanester
