= Kervignac =

Commune in Brittany, France

Kervignac Kervignag
- Commune
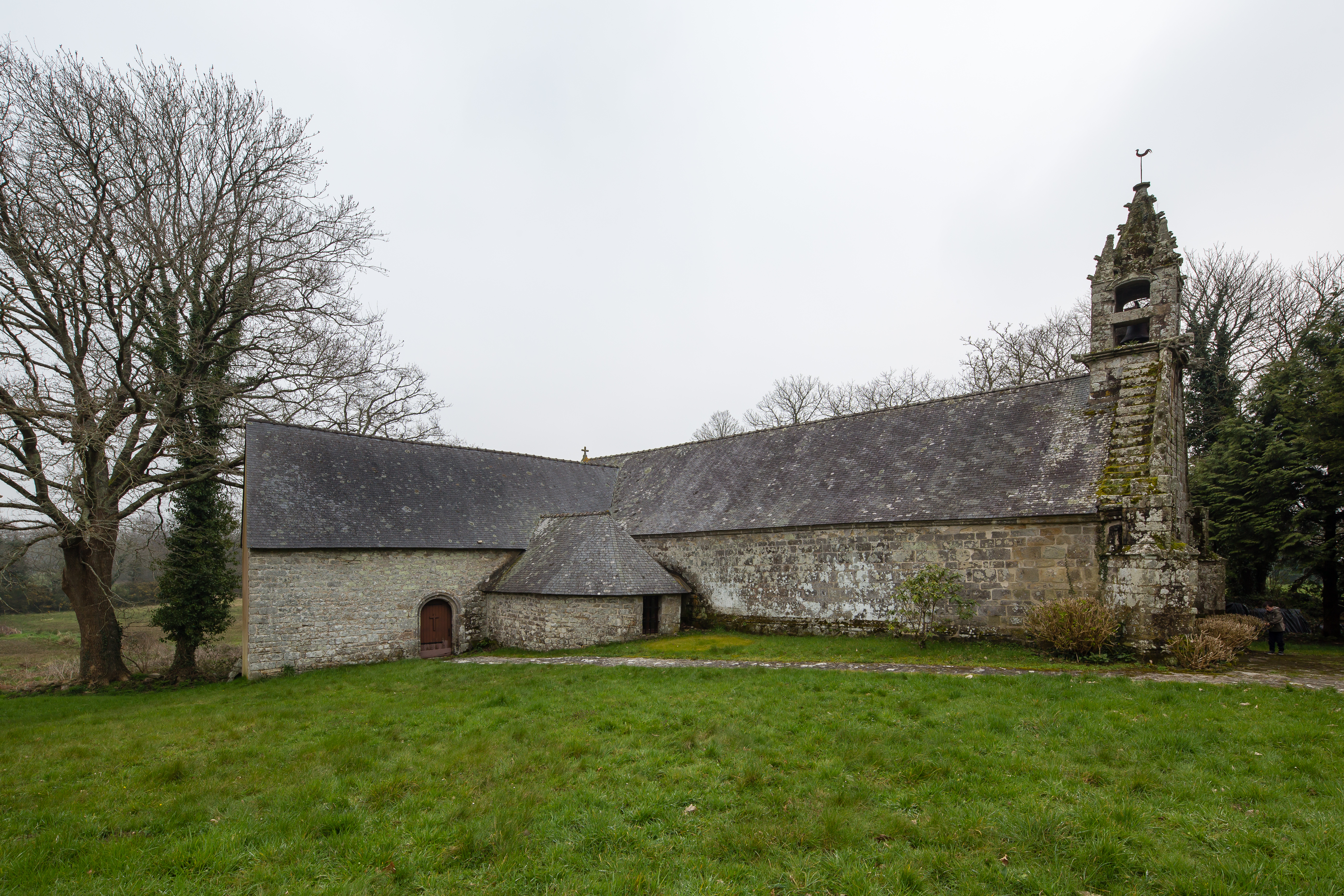
- The Chapel of Our Lady of the Clarity, in Kervignac

- Coat of arms
- Location of Kervignac
- Location within France Location within Brittany
- Coordinates: 47°45′51″N 3°14′15″W
- Country: France
- Region: Brittany
- Department: Morbihan
- Arrondissement: Lorient
- Canton: Hennebont
- Intercommunality: Blavet Bellevue Océan

Government
  - Mayor (2026–32): Élodie Le Floch
- Area^{1}: 39.56 km^{2} (15.27 sq mi)
- Highest elevation: 70 m (230 ft)
- Lowest elevation: 0 m (0 ft)
- Population (2023): 7,204
  - Density: 182.1/km^{2} (471.6/sq mi)
- Time zone: UTC+01:00 (CET)
  - Summer (DST): UTC+02:00 (CEST)
- INSEE/Postal code: 56094 /56700
- ^{1} French Land Register data, which excludes lakes, ponds, glaciers > 1 km^{2} (0.386 sq mi or 247 acres) and river estuaries.

Kervignac (French pronunciation: [kɛʁviɲak]; Breton: Kervignag) is a commune in the Morbihan department of Brittany in north-western France.

== Demographics ==
Inhabitants of Kervignac are called in French Kervignacois.

Historical population
Year	Pop.	±% p.a.
1968	2,119	—
1975	2,352	+1.50%
1982	2,969	+3.38%
1990	3,681	+2.72%
1999	4,113	+1.24%
2007	5,173	+2.91%
2012	6,401	+4.35%
2017	6,596	+0.60%
2023	7,204	+1.48%
Source: INSEE

== See also ==
- Communes of the Morbihan department
- Pont du Bonhomme
