= Lanester Velodrome Stadium =

Indoor cycling track in France

Coordinates: 47.769886°N 3.32972°W

Stade vélodrome de Lanester
- Interactive map of Stade vélodrome de Lanester
- Capacity: 3700, 1500 in grandstands

Construction
- Built: 2015

The Lanester Velodrome Stadium is a project dedicated to indoor Track Cycling and athletics. It is located in Lanester in the Morbihan, in France. It was finished in 2015, and has up to 3,700 places for attendance.

== Historical ==
=== Project Genesis ===
The project for a covered velodrome started in 1998 in the region of Lorient. The Stadium Moustoir which then served as a Velodrome stadium for the agglomeration was planned to be expanded when the football club who also uses, FC Lorient-Bretagne Sud, rose to the First Division in 1998. This expansion was at the expense of the cycling track that was destroyed, but Jean-Yves Le Drian, then mayor of Lorient, promised that a new stadium dedicated to cycling would be built.

A first draft plan for a stadium was presented to the elected representatives of the agglomeration of Lorient in 2002, dedicated solely to cycling, but it was considered as lacking in community interest and was not accepted. A second project was proposed in 2008, but this project, which remained very close to the original project, was still denied. A new project was presented the following year, and included, as in the case of Bordeaux velodromea, a multifunctional sporting venue; it was then supported by the local athletics people and the projected gathered more support.

=== Decision Finally Made ===
At the end of 2009, the project had sufficient support to be presented to the electors of the agglomeration. The project benefited from the development of the Cycling Grand Prix of Plouay in the region, and at the time there was a controversy about foreign teams using it as part of their preparedness for the London Olympics in 2012. However, this possibility spurred on the opposition of elected representatives of the Breton Democratic Union who saw other priorities to be met in advance, and also other elected officials of Guidel and of Larmor-Plage who saw other priorities for the funds.

Funding from the region and the state was granted 31 March 2008 under the State-Region project contract 2007–2014. The agglomeration of Lorient vote on project funding happened on 11 December 2009, followed on 20 January 2011 by the elected General Council of Morbihan. The budget of 17 million euros was then distributed among the region (Note: Funding is obtained through an investment in the region in four major structuring sports buildings, including also an indoor athletics stadium to Rennes and another Saint Brieuc and a theater and sporty Brest.) for 5 million euros, and from the State, the department, and agglomeration of Lorient 4 million euros each.

The terms of the architectural competition were adopted by the agglomeration council on 6 July 2012 which aims to select four teams.
