= Lanester =

Commune in Brittany, France

Lanester Lannarstêr (Breton)
- Commune
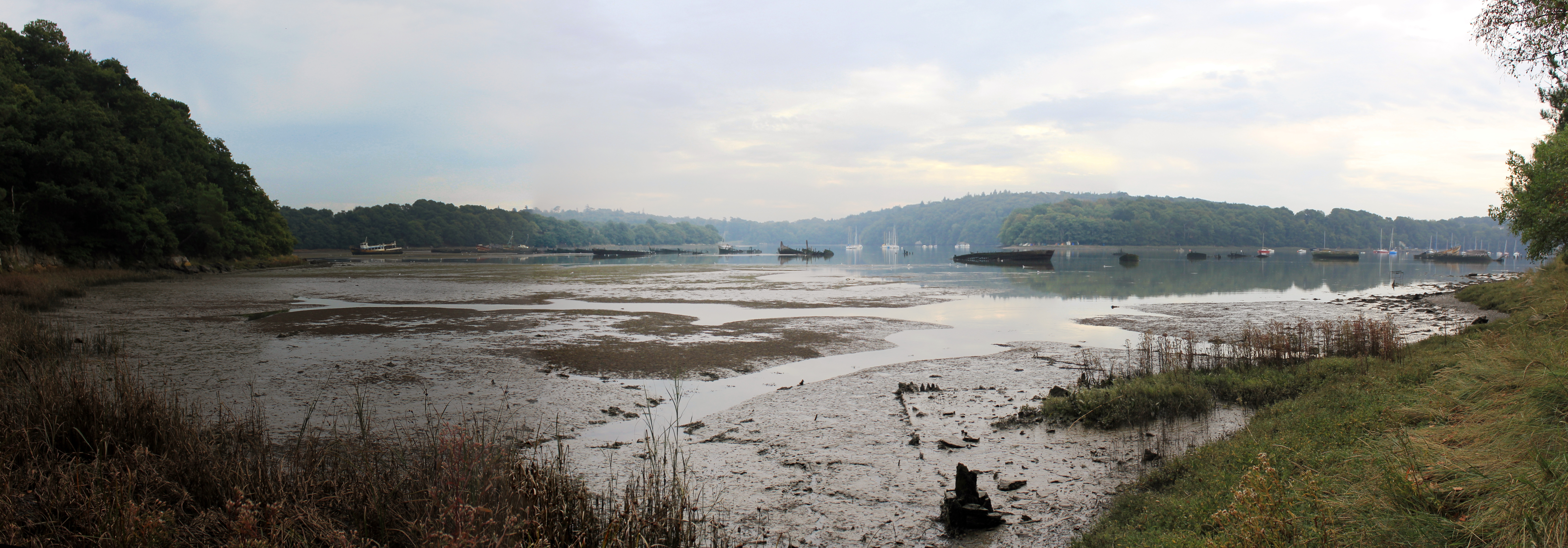
- The ship graveyard on the Blavet river

- Coat of arms
- Location of Lanester
- Location within France Location within Brittany
- Coordinates: 47°45′53″N 3°20′32″W
- Country: France
- Region: Brittany
- Department: Morbihan
- Arrondissement: Lorient
- Canton: Lanester
- Intercommunality: Lorient Agglomération

Government
  - Mayor (2026–32): Gilles Carreric
- Area^{1}: 18.37 km^{2} (7.09 sq mi)
- Highest elevation: 51 m (167 ft)
- Lowest elevation: 0 m (0 ft)
- Population (2023): 23,263
  - Density: 1,266/km^{2} (3,280/sq mi)
- Time zone: UTC+01:00 (CET)
  - Summer (DST): UTC+02:00 (CEST)
- INSEE/Postal code: 56098 /56600
- ^{1} French Land Register data, which excludes lakes, ponds, glaciers > 1 km^{2} (0.386 sq mi or 247 acres) and river estuaries.

Lanester (French pronunciation: [lanɛstɛʁ]; Breton: Lannarstêr) is a commune in the Morbihan department in Brittany, in north-western France.

It is the largest suburb of the city of Lorient, across the river Scorff to the east.

Lanester Velodrome Stadium was built there in 2015.

== Demographics ==
Inhabitants of Lanester are called Lanestériens.

Historical population

Year	Pop.	±% p.a.
1911	7,729	—
1921	8,038	+0.39%
1926	7,790	−0.62%
1931	7,795	+0.01%
1936	8,668	+2.15%
1946	5,750	−4.02%
1954	11,737	+9.33%
1962	16,571	+4.41%
1968	19,245	+2.52%

Year	Pop.	±% p.a.
1975	21,074	+1.31%
1982	21,643	+0.38%
1990	22,102	+0.26%
1999	21,897	−0.10%
2007	22,598	+0.39%
2012	22,142	−0.41%
2017	22,728	+0.52%
2023	23,263	+0.39%

Source: EHESS and INSEE (1968-2023)

== Geography ==
The mouth of the river Scorff separates the town of Lorient from the town of Lanester. Lanester is on the left bank while Lorient is on the right bank. The mouth of river Blavet forms a natural boundary to the east and to the south.

== Map ==
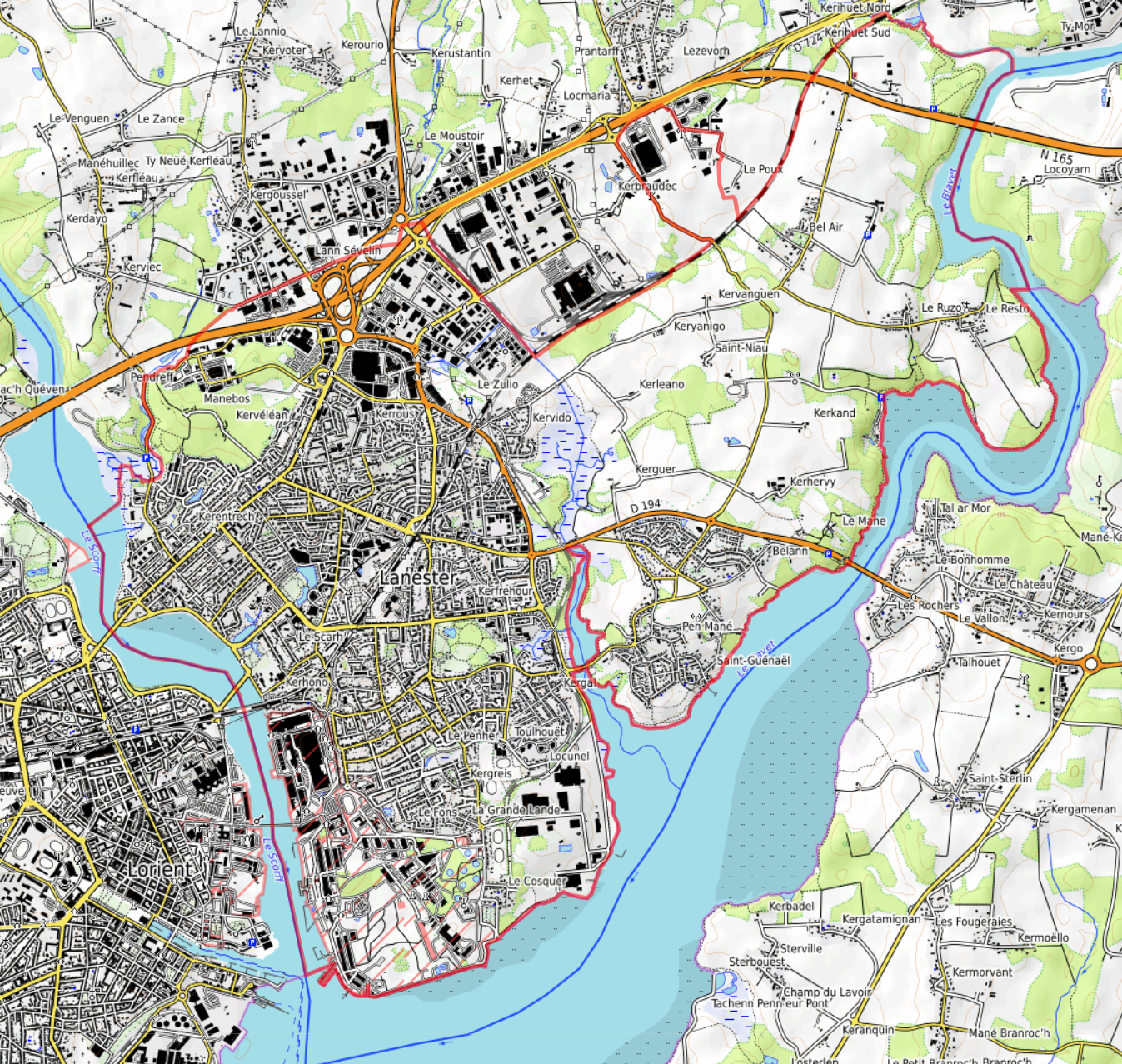
Topographic map

== History ==
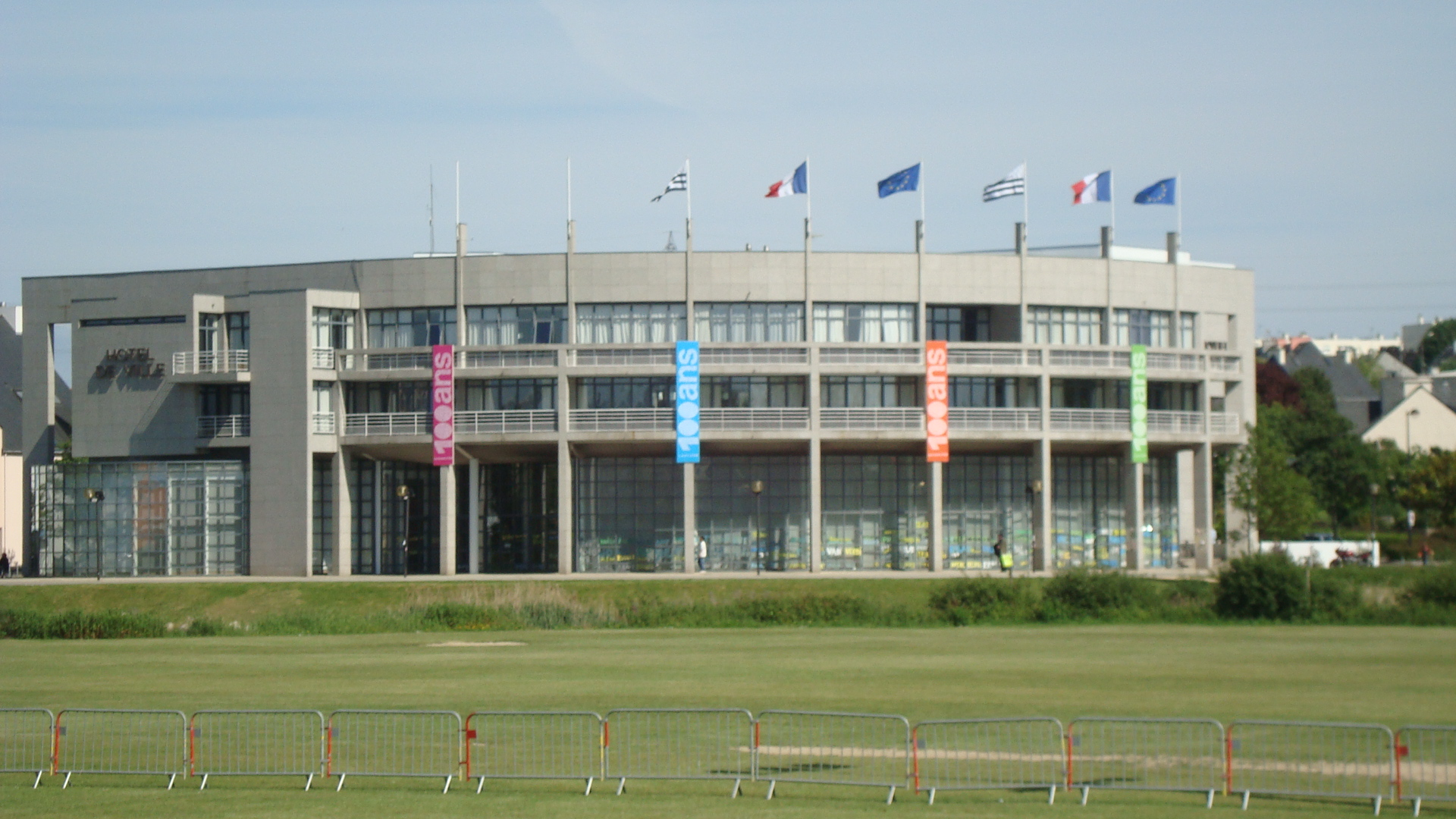
The Hôtel de Ville

Lanester was created later than Lorient, with the development of shipyards on the left bank of the river Scorff in the middle of the nineteenth century. Lanester was created as a new commune on February 26, 1909. Before that, it came within the administrative area of the village of Caudan.

The old oil pier, located on the left bank of the Scorff, is due to be demolished in November 2025.

The Hôtel de Ville was completed in 1992.

== Breton language ==
The municipality created a linguistic plan through Ya d'ar brezhoneg on 13 July 2006.

In 2008, 5.67% of the children attended the bilingual schools in primary education.

== See also ==
- Communes of the Morbihan department
- Pont du Bonhomme
