= Poilly-lez-Gien =

- Commune
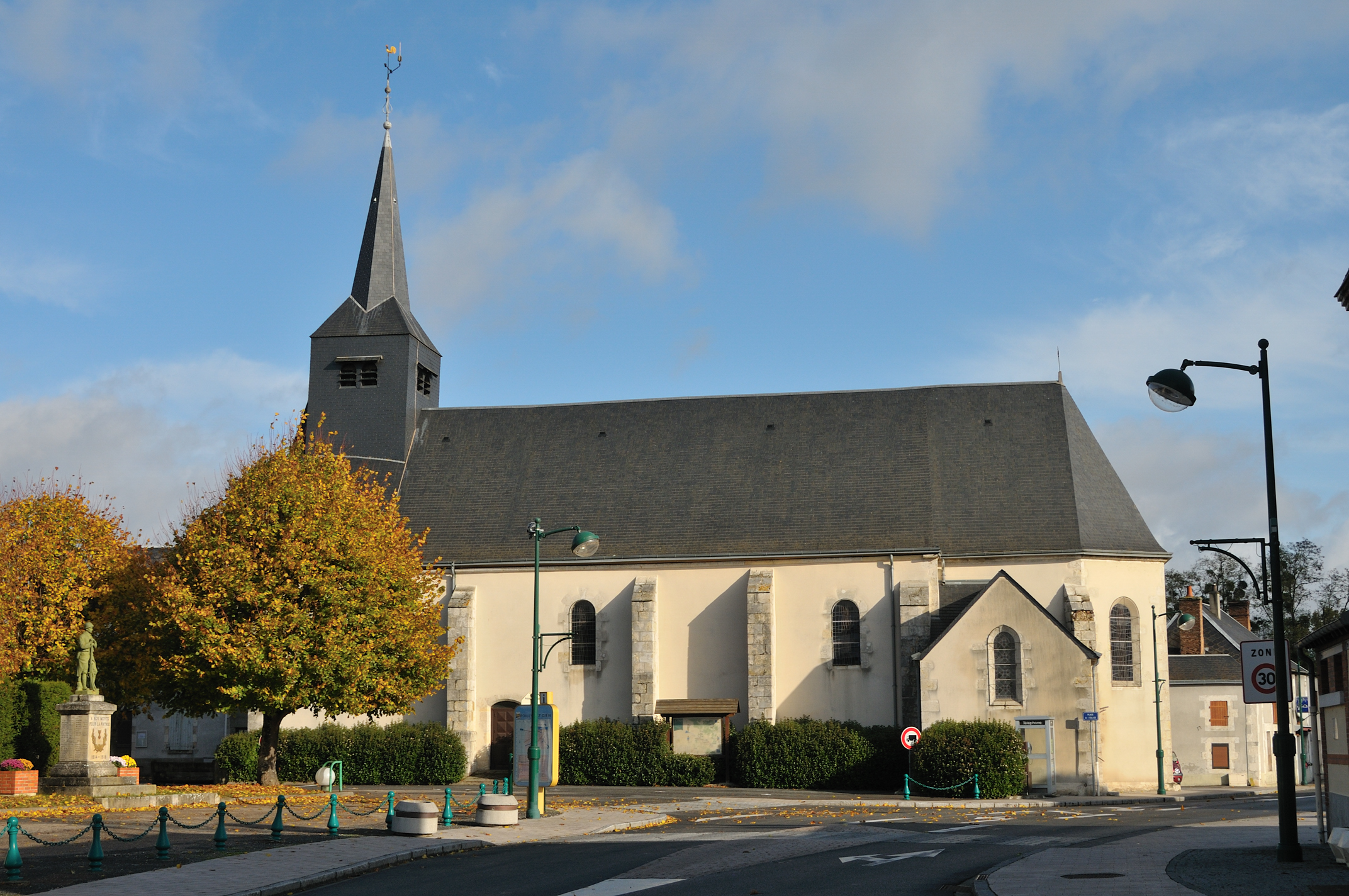
- The church in Poilly-lez-Gien
- Location of Poilly-lez-Gien
- Location within France Location within Centre-Val de Loire
- Coordinates: 47°40′43″N 2°36′00″E
- Country: France
- Region: Centre-Val de Loire
- Department: Loiret
- Arrondissement: Montargis
- Canton: Sully-sur-Loire
- Intercommunality: CC Giennoises

Government
  - Mayor (2020–2026): Alain Chaborel
- Area^{1}: 33.29 km^{2} (12.85 sq mi)
- Highest elevation: 182 m (597 ft)
- Lowest elevation: 117 m (384 ft)
- Population (2023): 2,465
  - Density: 74.05/km^{2} (191.8/sq mi)
- Demonym: Polisson
- Time zone: UTC+01:00 (CET)
  - Summer (DST): UTC+02:00 (CEST)
- INSEE/Postal code: 45254 /45500
- ^{1} French Land Register data, which excludes lakes, ponds, glaciers > 1 km^{2} (0.386 sq mi or 247 acres) and river estuaries.

Poilly-lez-Gien (French pronunciation: [pwaji lɛ ʒjɛ̃], literally Poilly near Gien) is a commune in the Loiret department, located in north-central France.

== Population ==
Historical population
Year	Pop.	±% p.a.
1968	1,550	—
1975	1,849	+2.55%
1982	2,104	+1.86%
1990	2,281	+1.01%
1999	2,189	−0.46%
2007	2,279	+0.50%
2012	2,377	+0.85%
2017	2,406	+0.24%
2023	2,465	+0.40%
Source: INSEE

== See also ==
- Communes of the Loiret department
