= La Liberté du Morbihan =

La Liberté du Morbihan is the title under which, on 18 August 1944, the evening newspaper of Le Morbihan Libéré was published, in support of the French Resistance. The first issue was published on 5 August and dated the 6th. The last issue appeared on 28 October 1995.

== History ==
On 18 August 1944, the prefect of Morbihan, Jacques Onfroy, who took office on 4 August, authorised the publication of "La Liberté du Morbihan", and donated the stocks of paper and materials from Nouvelliste.

It replaced the newspaper "Le Nouvelliste du Morbihan", forbidden and confiscated for collaboration.

The first chairman of the new newspaper was a résistant, professional journalist Jean Le Duigou, who left the role in mid October 1944 before devoting himself to journalism again.

In October 1944, a Société à responsabilité limitée was founded consisting of 23 shares of 5,000 Francs each:

- three reserved for newspaper staff,
- one for the General Confederation of Labour (France),
- one for the French Confederation of Christian Workers,
- one for a fisherman, a member of the Comité départemental de libération;
- 17 others consisting of politicians (Socialists and Christian Democrats) and members of different professions.

"La Liberté du Morbihan" moved to Lorient in March 1951.

Published daily in the evenings since its creation, La Liberté moved to morning publication in November 1981, when the newspaper was printed in Nantes by Presse-Océan. This technical reorganisation failed to arrest a downturn in fortunes and falling readership. The last issue was published on 28 October 1995

== Notes and references ==
=== Sources ===
- Annik Le Guen, L'épuration dans le Morbihan, pages 64 à 66, novembre 1992, ISBN 2-909750-24-8 .
- Gaby Le Cam (2005). Société d'archéologie et d'histoire du pays de Lorient (ed.). "Du premier Nouvelliste du Morbihan à la dernière Liberté du Morbihan". sahpl.asso.fr. GLeCam.
- Bernard Lebeau et Patrick Mahéo, Communication à la Société Polymathique du Morbihan, "L'Imprimerie du Commerce de Vannes", Wednesday 10 October 2001.
