= Anna Gien =

German writer and columnist

Anna-Katharina Gien (born April 29, 1991 in Munich) is a German writer and columnist.

== Life ==
Gien is the daughter of the Germanist Gabriele Gien. She grew up in Munich and Augsburg. She studied cultural studies and art history in Berlin and Florence. After working for various art institutions, artistic projects and as a freelance author for art magazines, she devoted herself increasingly to literary and essayistic writing. From 2018, she wrote a column for the magazine Monopol under the title Das wird schon. She writes articles and essays for Die Zeit and Zeit Online as well as art magazines and catalogs. Her texts often deal with power and desire, economies of the female body, the fragility of perception, submission and love and work with influences from the visual arts, the nouvelle vague, symbolism and horror.

In 2019, her debut novel M, co-written with Marlene Stark, was published by Matthes & Seitz Berlin. A theater adaptation was planned for 2020 at the Berliner Schaubühne, but was postponed due to the COVID-19 pandemic.
