= Morlaix viaduct =

Railway bridge in Britanny, France

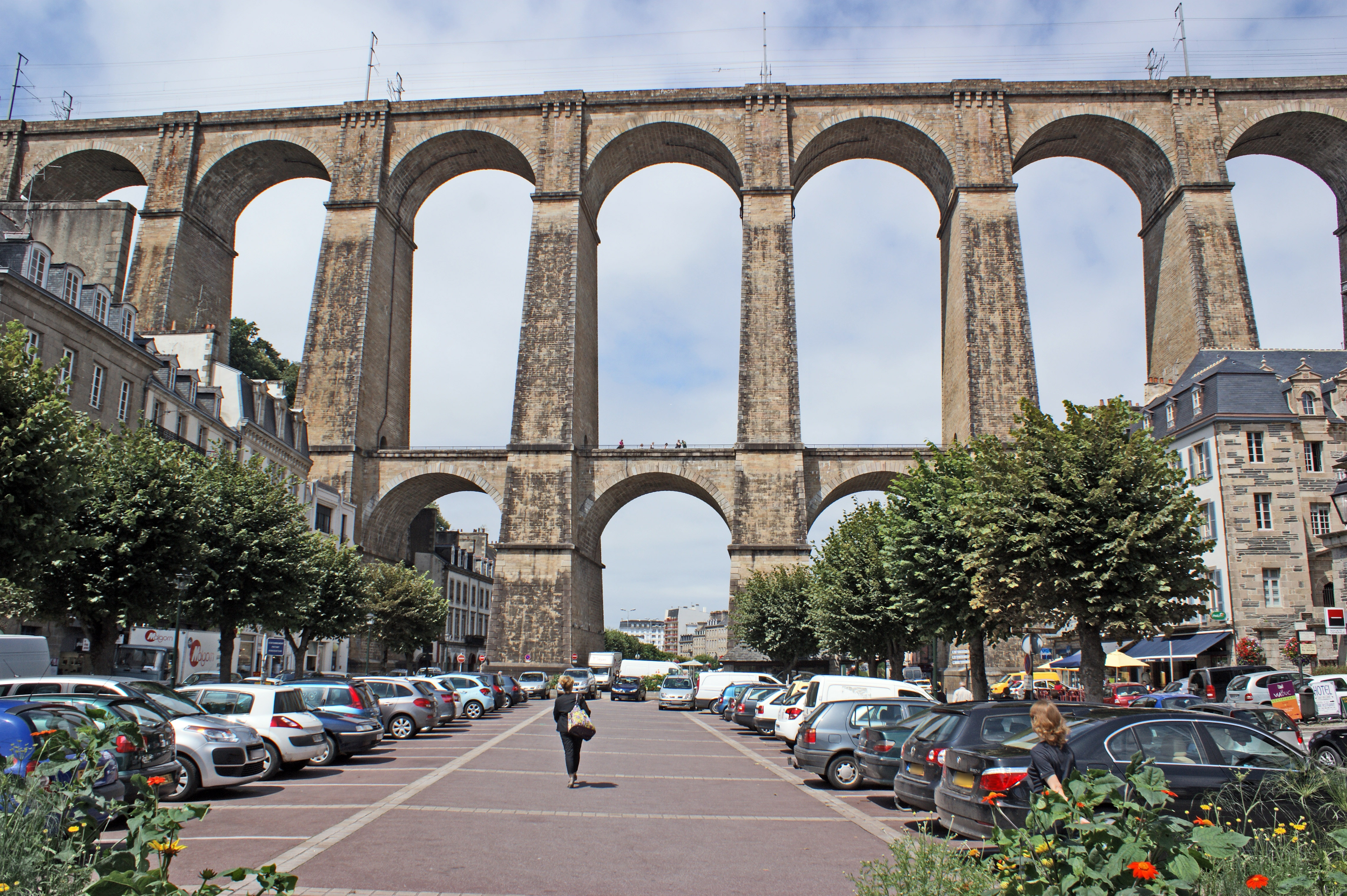
- The viaduct seen from Place des Otages.
- Coordinates: 48°34′44″N 3°49′46″W
- Locale: Finistère, Bretagne, France

Characteristics
- Total length: 292 m
- Height: 62 m

History
- Constructed by: Victor Fénoux Planchat
- Built: 26 April 1865

Location
- Interactive map of Morlaix viaduct

The Morlaix viaduct is a railway bridge, of the viaduct type, located in the city of Morlaix which allows the crossing of the Morlaix river and the service to the city station by the line from Paris-Montparnasse to Brest.

On 29 January 1943, as part of Allied strategic bombing, eight American Boston fighter-bombers of the Royal Air Force dropped 43 bombs, accidentally killing eighty residents. A single bomb damaged the viaduct which was quickly repaired. The La Méaugon viaduct, which is also important but located far from any habitation, was not bombed.

== Railway situation ==
The Morlaix viaduct is at kilometer point (PK) 562,464 of the Paris–Montparnasse line in Brest. Preceded by the Plouigneau station and the Trévidy viaduct, its crossing allows arrival at Morlaix station located on the heights of the town at an altitude of 61 meters.

== History ==
Before its construction the viaduct aroused controversy, particularly regarding its location, in the very heart of the city. On 25 May 1860 a majority of municipal councilors (15 out of 19) took a deliberation judging that the work, given its size, "will be an obstacle to the good ventilation of a town confined at the bottom of narrow valleys". But the West Company ignores this.

=== Construction ===
Construction of the viaduct began on 20 July 1861. A first convoy took it on 2 November 1863, consisting of a locomotive perched on a carriage pulled by 19 horses. It was delivered to the Chemins de fer de l'Ouest on 11 December 1863, and put into service on 25 April 1865.

On 28 September 1891 the line from Morlaix to Carhaix, on meter gauge, was put into service and took the viaduct by adding a third rail.

=== The English bombardment ===
On 29 January 1943, six American-made Boston MkII fighter-bombers of the Royal Air Force carried out a strategic bombing, dropping 43 bombs on the town of Morlaix with the aim of cutting the railway line by damaging the viaduct. A single projectile hits the target, creating, between the third and fourth pillars, a gap measuring four by five meters; The other bombs missed the viaduct but nevertheless killed eighty residents and injured many others. A bomb destroys the Notre-Dame-de-Lourdes nursery school, killing thirty-nine children aged four to seven and their teacher Sister Saint-Cyr (Herveline Laurent).

The La Méaugon viaduct, also important but far from any habitation, was not bombed.

Rail traffic was only interrupted for a few hours and the viaduct was quickly repaired by the German authorities, due to the minor damage.

=== Protection ===
On 29 October 1975 the viaduct was registered as a historic monument.

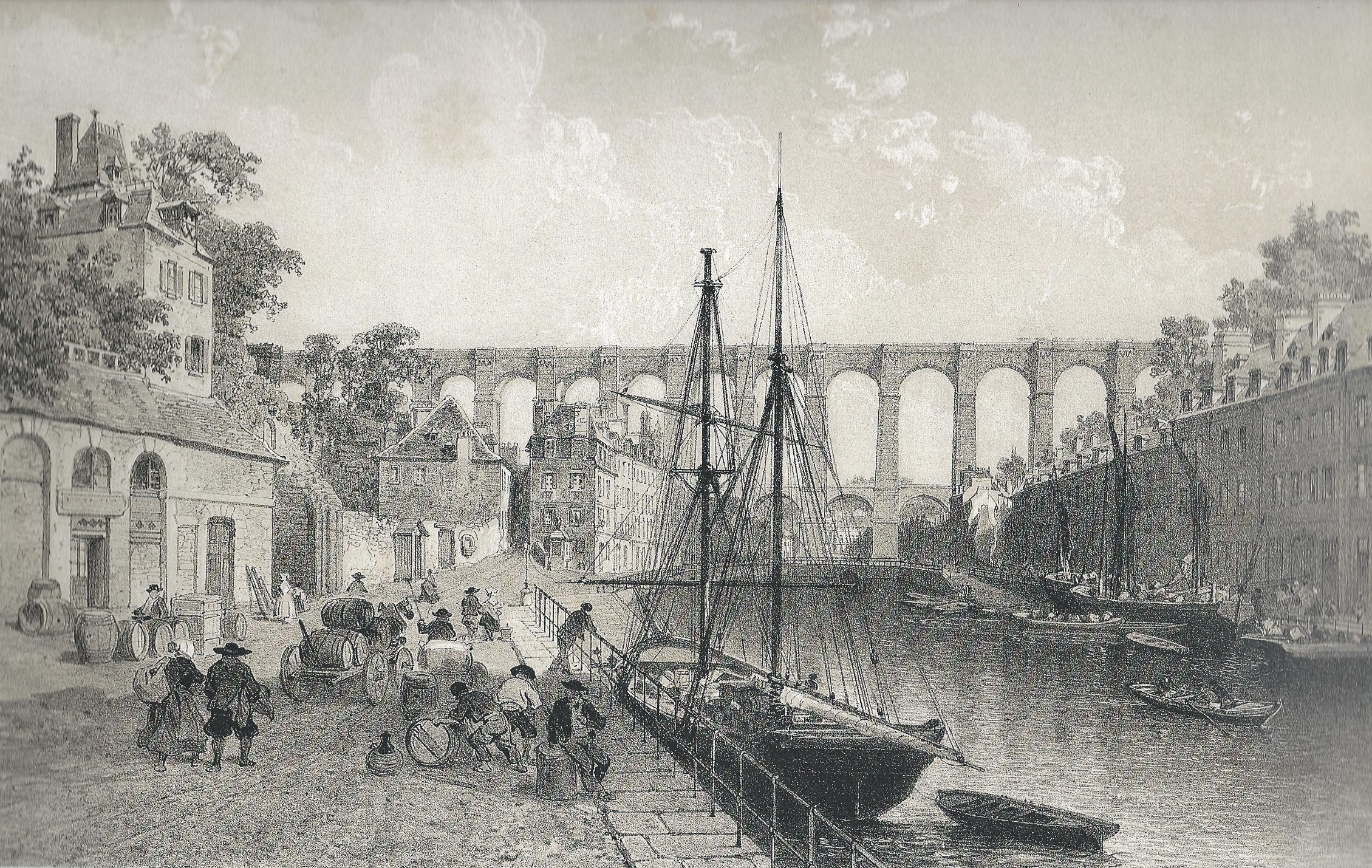
Le viaduc du chemin de fer et le fond du port, Félix Benoist, 1865.

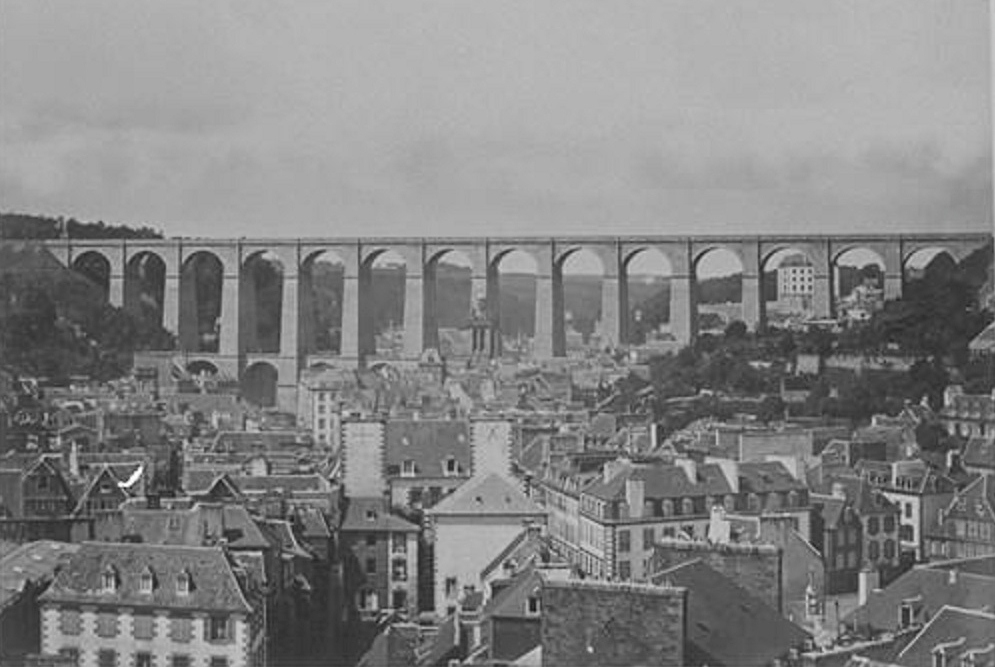
Morlaix and its viaduct in 1873.

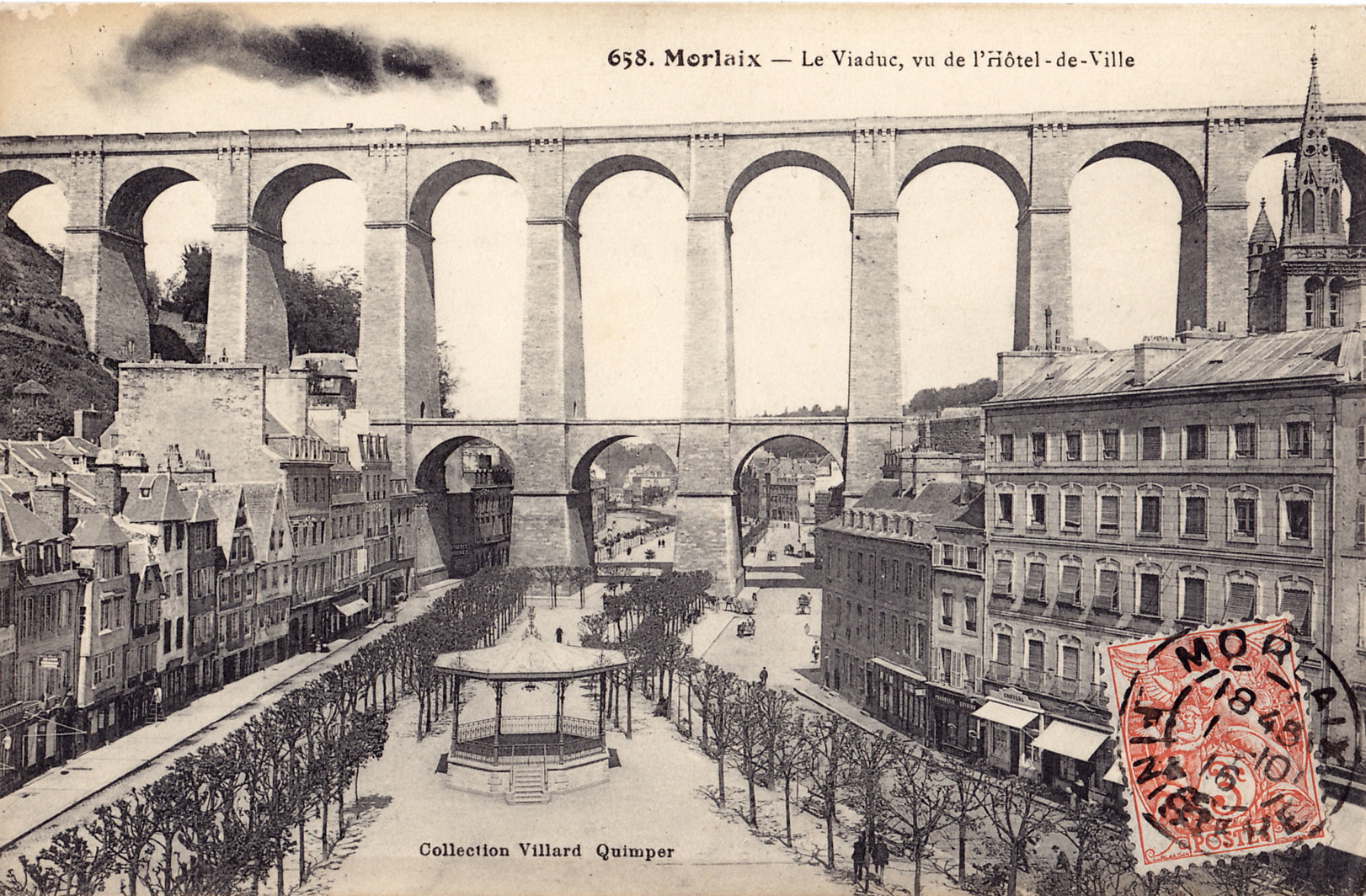
View at the beginning of the 20th century from the town hall.

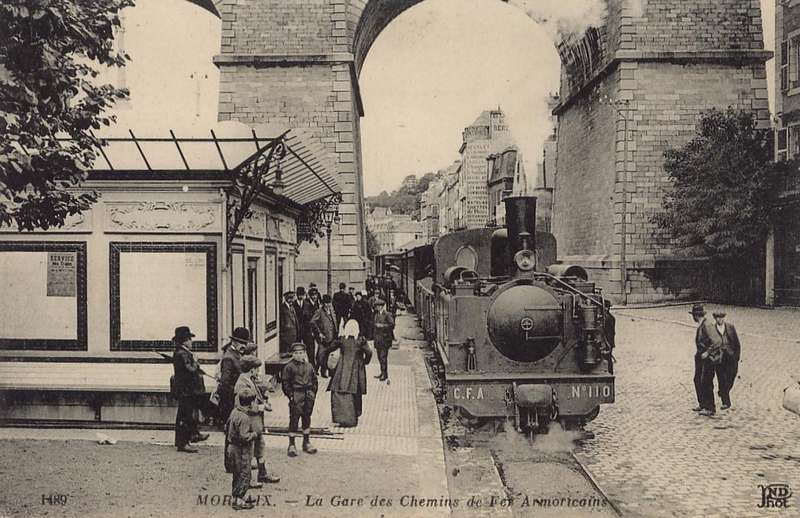
Under the viaduct passed the Chemins de Fer Armoricains (CFA).

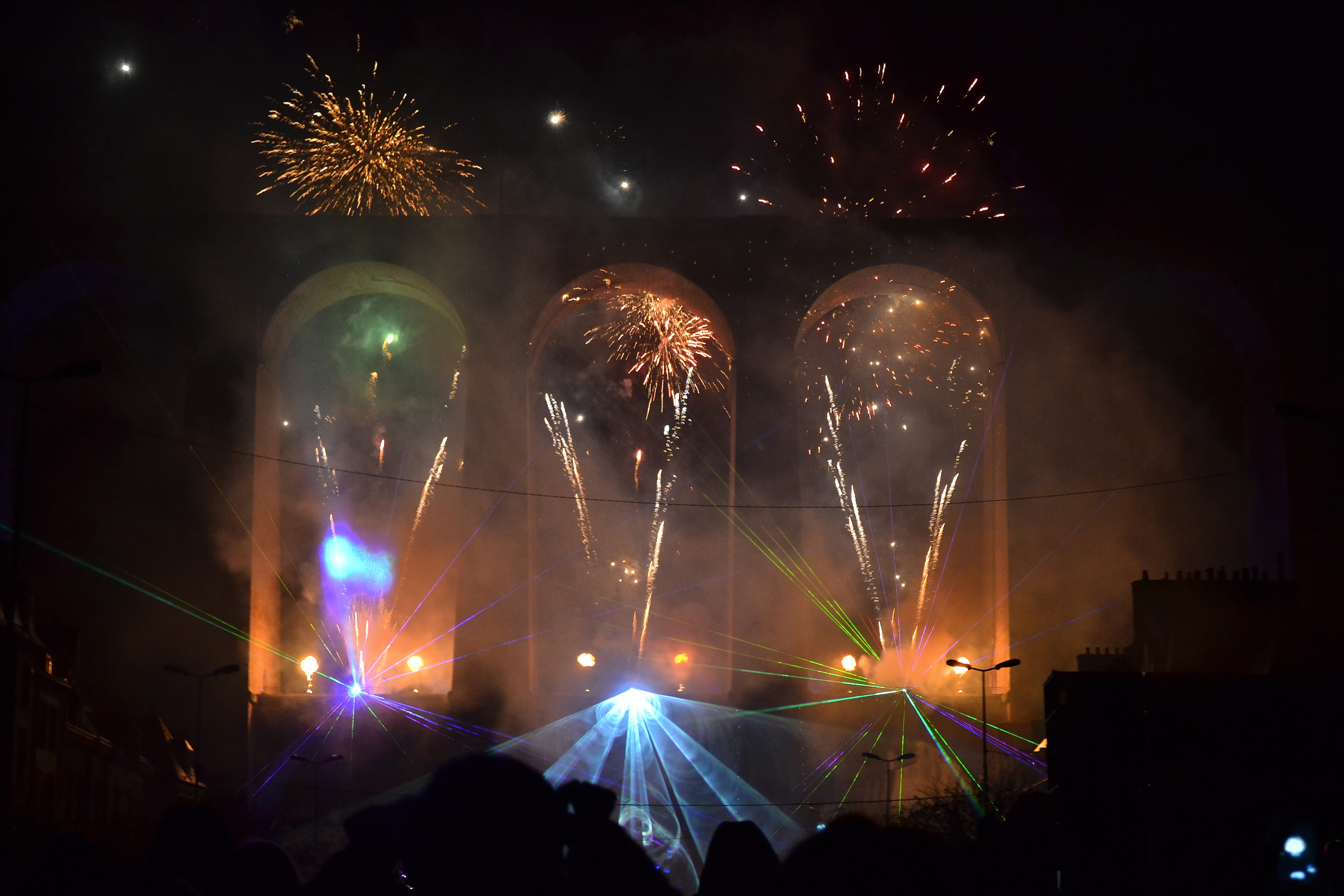
In 2013, it celebrated its 150th anniversary.

== Features ==
Drawing of the viaduct, in elevation.

It measures 292 meters long and rises to 62 meters in height. Its main span is 15,50 m. It includes two levels with nine arches of 13,47 m opening on the lower level and fourteen arches of 15,50 m on the upper level. The piles have a thickness varying between 11,16 and 19,36 m.

For Victor Fénoux, "this dimension, without being exaggerated, nevertheless remains much above the thickness strictly necessary from the point of view of pressures; but in works of this nature, excessive lightness shocks the eye as much as reason. The slightly masculine and obviously reassuring proportions alone give the construction the monumental character that suits it."

Taking into account the shutdowns due to winter, it only took 23 months to build it, or 406,105 worker days paid 2,50 F, sometimes less.

With a total volume of 65,830 m3, the viaduct requires 11,000 m3 of cut granite, 52,209 m3 of rough rubble, 3,401 m3 of quilted rubble, 2,724 m3 of dressed stone, 20,000 m3 of sand, 2,500 m3 of wood and 43 tonnes of iron. Contrary to appearances, the viaduct was not built entirely in cut stone: “The use of cut stone,” explains Victor Fénoux, “was restricted to frames, corner stones, bands, cords, plinths and sideboards."

The final cost is 2,502,905,23 F, and, with the roads, 2,674,540,46 F. The forecast was 2,656,500 F.

== See also ==
- List of bridges in France
- Paris–Brest railway

== Bibliography ==
- Euzen, Jean-Pierre (2013). "L'arrivée du chemin de fer en Bretagne Nord" (in French). Paris: Riveneuve éditions. ISBN 978-2-36013-171-6
- Euzen, Jean-Pierre (2015). "L'étoile ferrée morlaisienne" (in French). Paris: Riveneuve éditions. ISBN 978-2-36013-295-9
- Fénoux, Victor. "Note sur les travaux de construction du grand viaduc de Morlaix". Annales des ponts et chaussées: Partie technique. Mémoires et documents relatifs a l'art des constructions et au service de l'ingénieur (in French).
- Caron, François (1999). Le Patrimoine de la SNCF et des chemins de fer français (2 Tomes) (in French). Paris: Flohic éditions. ISBN 2842340698.
- Grattesat, Guy (1984). Ponts de France (in French). Paris: Presses Ponts et chaussées. ISBN 2859780300.
- Montens, Serge (2001). Les plus beaux ponts de France (in French). Paris: Bonneton. ISBN 2862532754.
- Prade, Marcel (1988). Les ponts monuments historiques (in French). Poitiers: Éditions Brissaud. ISBN 2903442819.
