= Blavet =

River in France

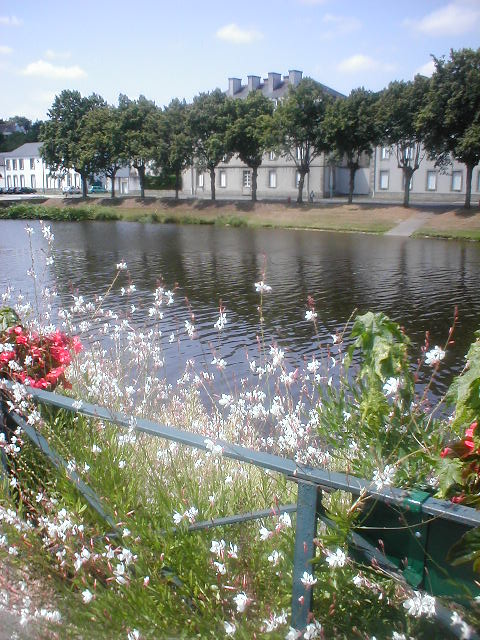
- The Blavet in Pontivy

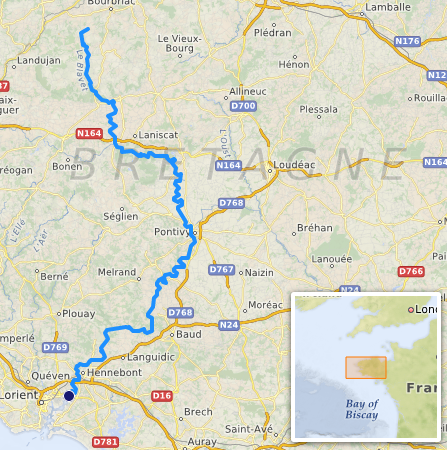
- Native name: Le Blavet (French)

Location
- Country: France

Physical characteristics
- Source
  - location: Brittany
- Mouth
  - location: Atlantic Ocean
  - coordinates: 47°42′32″N 3°22′5″W
- Length: 148.9 km (92.5 mi)

The Blavet (French pronunciation: [blavɛ]; Breton: Blavezh) river flows from central Brittany and enters the Atlantic Ocean on the south coast near Lorient. It is 148.9 km (92.5 mi) long. The river is canalised for most of its length, forming one of the links in the Brittany canal system. It connects with the Canal de Nantes à Brest at Pontivy and runs to Hennebont, a distance of 60 km. From the last lock at Polvern, the river is tidal and considered as a maritime waterway, giving access to the seaport of Lorient and the Atlantic Ocean. It became more important when the western half of that system was cut off by the construction of the Guerlédan dam and hydropower plant. Today, boats coming from Nantes via Redon have to take the Canal du Blavet in order to reach the ocean near Lorient.

The source of the Blavet is east of Bulat-Pestivien, Côtes-d'Armor. It flows through the following départements and towns:

- Côtes-d'Armor: Saint-Nicolas-du-Pélem, Gouarec
- Morbihan: Pontivy, Hennebont, Lorient

Among its tributaries are the Ével and the Scorff.

== History ==
The canalisation works were carried out by order of Napoleon in 1802 to provide access to the strategic military town of Pontivy. Like the entire Brittany canal network, its raison d’être was military defence in case of a naval blockade of the coast by the British Navy. Works began in 1804 and were completed in 1825.

== Navigation ==
The waterway has little recreational traffic because of the large number of locks in the watershed section of the Nantes-Brest canal between Pontivy and Rohan, and the effective barrier of Guerlédan Dam to the west.

== See also ==
- Bretagne, Waterways Guide No. 1. Editions du Breil, ISBN
- Pont du Bonhomme
