= Caudan =

Commune in Brittany, France

Caudan Kaodan
- Commune
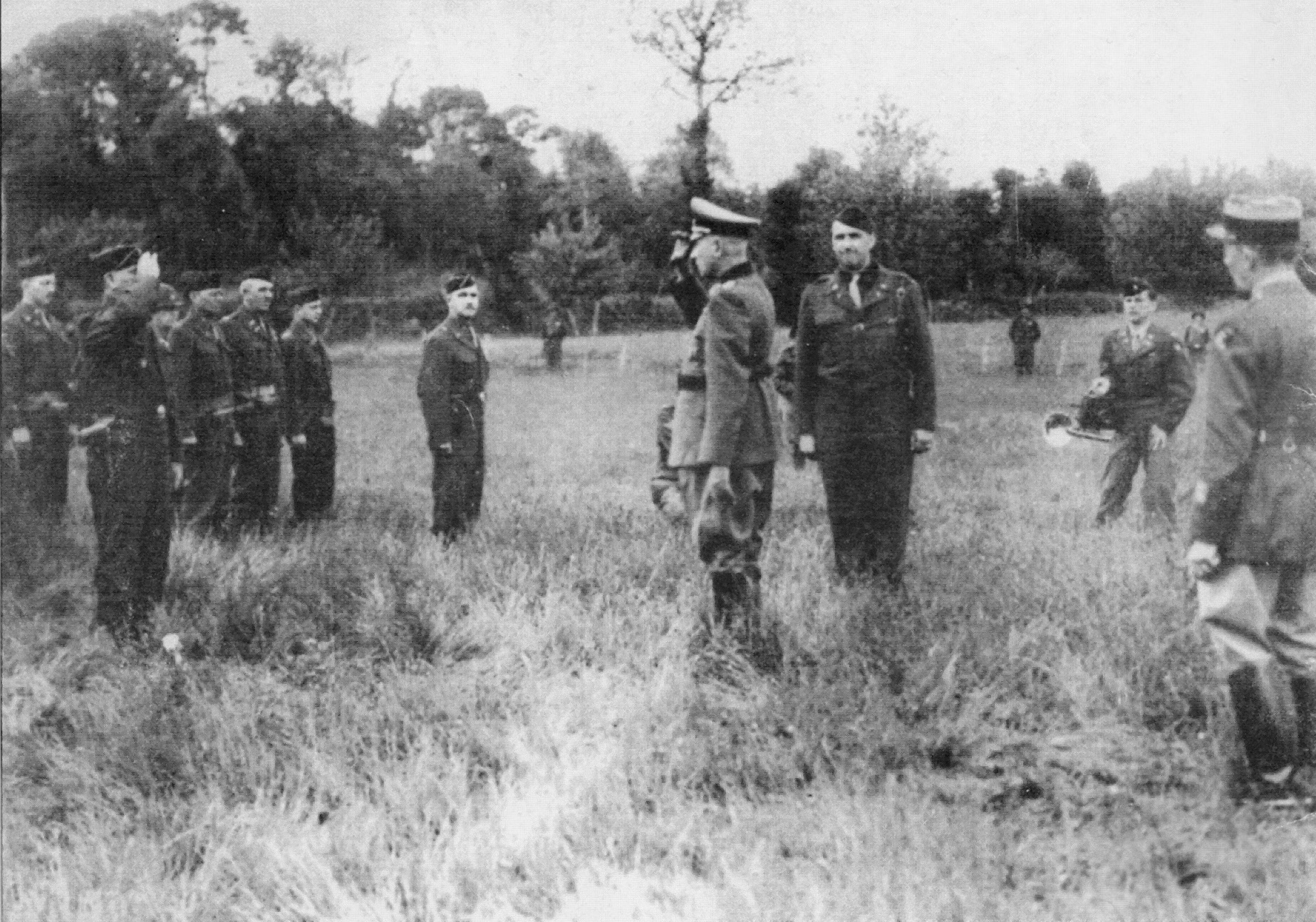
- German army surrender in a field in Caudan on 10 May 1945.
- Location of Caudan
- Location within France Location within Brittany
- Coordinates: 47°48′41″N 3°20′21″W
- Country: France
- Region: Brittany
- Department: Morbihan
- Arrondissement: Lorient
- Canton: Lanester
- Intercommunality: Lorient Agglomération

Government
  - Mayor (2026–32): Fabrice Vély
- Area^{1}: 42.63 km^{2} (16.46 sq mi)
- Highest elevation: 84 m (276 ft)
- Lowest elevation: 2 m (6.6 ft)
- Population (2023): 7,206
  - Density: 169.0/km^{2} (437.8/sq mi)
- Time zone: UTC+01:00 (CET)
  - Summer (DST): UTC+02:00 (CEST)
- INSEE/Postal code: 56036 /56850
- ^{1} French Land Register data, which excludes lakes, ponds, glaciers > 1 km^{2} (0.386 sq mi or 247 acres) and river estuaries.

Caudan (French pronunciation: [kodɑ̃]; Breton: Kaodan) is a commune in the Morbihan department of Brittany in north-western France. The writer Yvonne Chauffin (1905–1995), laureate of the Prix Breizh in 1970, died in Caudan.

== Demographics ==
Inhabitants of Caudan are called in French Caudanais.

Historical population
Year	Pop.	±% p.a.
1968	2,686	—
1975	4,764	+8.53%
1982	5,819	+2.90%
1990	6,674	+1.73%
1999	6,744	+0.12%
2007	6,825	+0.15%
2012	6,806	−0.06%
2017	6,838	+0.09%
2023	7,206	+0.88%
Source: INSEE

== Geography ==
Caudan is part of the urban area of Lorient city, located north of the town of Lanester.

== See also ==
- Communes of the Morbihan department
