= Nantes Transporter Bridge =

Demolished Bridge in Nantes

Nantes Transporter Bridge Pont transbordeur de Nantes
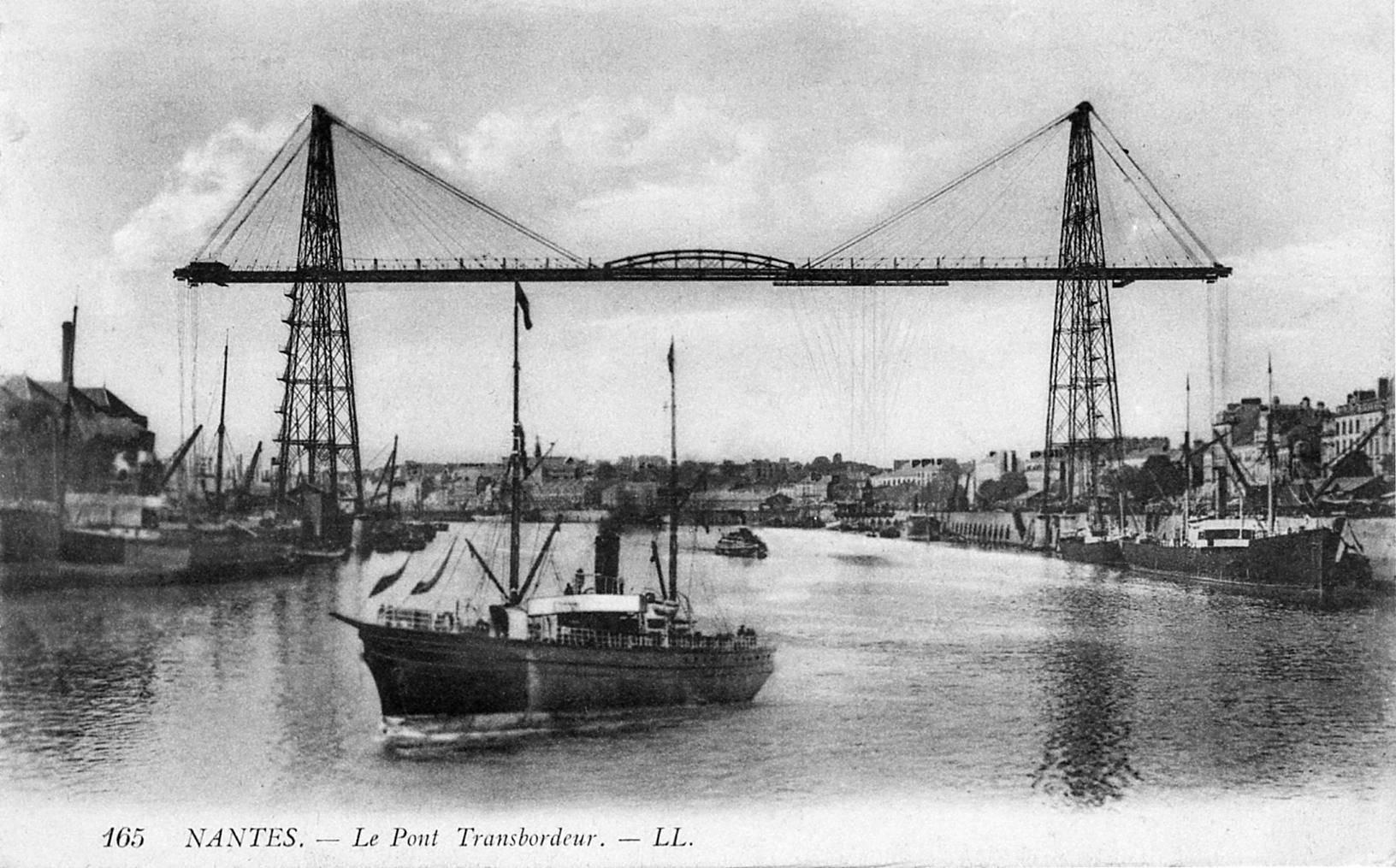
- The transporter bridge in Nantes prior to 1914
- Coordinates: 47.208333°N 1.566111°W
- Crossed: Loire (Madeleine branch)
- Locale: Nantes, France
- Official name: Pont transbordeur de Nantes

Characteristics
- Design: Transporter bridge
- Material: Steel
- Total length: 141 metres (463 ft)
- Height: 75 metres (246 ft)
- Clearance above: 50 metres (160 ft)

History
- Designer: Ferdinand Arnodin
- Constructed by: Usines Arnodin
- Opened: November 1, 1903
- Closed: 1 January 1955
- Demolished: May 1958

Location
- Interactive map of Nantes Transporter Bridge

The Nantes Transporter Bridge (Pont transbordeur de Nantes) was a transporter bridge across the Loire in Nantes, France. Designed by engineer Ferdinand Arnodin, it opened in 1903 and was dismantled in 1958.

The bridge spanned the Madeleine branch (bras de la Madeleine) near the present site of the Anne de Bretagne Bridge, connecting the Quai de la Fosse on the right bank to the Île de la Prairie-au-Duc on the left bank.

== History ==
=== Background and planning ===
During the late 19th century, industrial growth along the Loire created demand for improved transport between the city center and the shipyards on the Île de la Prairie-au-Duc.

Traditional bridge designs were rejected due to navigational requirements. A conventional fixed bridge would have required high clearance and long access ramps to allow sailing ships to pass, requiring the acquisition and demolition of surrounding property on the quays. A swing bridge was ruled out because of river currents, and a tunnel was deemed unfeasible due to unstable sandy soil.

The transporter bridge concept, previously developed by Arnodin and Alberto de Palacio for the Vizcaya Bridge near Bilbao, provided clearance for ship masts while allowing transport at quay level. Official approval was granted by a decree of public utility on 26 May 1898, giving Arnodin an 80-year operating concession.

=== Construction and operation ===
Construction began on 16 February 1902. Steel components for the 75-metre (246 ft) pylons and main deck were manufactured at the Arnodin works in Châteauneuf-sur-Loire. The right-bank pylon was erected by November 1902, followed by the left-bank pylon in February 1903.

The 46-tonne central truss section was lifted into place 50 metres (160 ft) above the river on 3 August 1903. Load testing was conducted using 85 tonnes of paving stones on the suspended gondola.

The bridge opened on 1 November 1903. On its opening day, it carried approximately 10,000 pedestrians and 2,000 vehicles or higher-fare passengers.

=== Closure and demolition ===
Use of the bridge declined following World War II. The filling of northern arms of the Loire (such as the Erdre diversion) modified local traffic routes, and operating costs resulted in financial deficits. A proposal in the early 1950s to classify the bridge as a monument historique was rejected.

Service ceased on 1 January 1955. Despite local opposition, the municipal council voted to dismantle the structure. Dismantling started on 21 May 1958 with the lowering of the central span, and the steelwork was sent to scrap works in Le Creusot by October 1958.

== Design ==
The bridge used a counterweighted cable-stayed design developed by Arnodin, which avoided the need for long land-based anchor cables and reduced the footprint on the quays.

A motorized gondola suspended from a trolley ran along the high deck, traversing the 142-metre (466 ft) span in about two minutes. The gondola included a central roadway for vehicles, covered areas for passengers, and an elevated control cabin for the driver (referred to as the wattman).

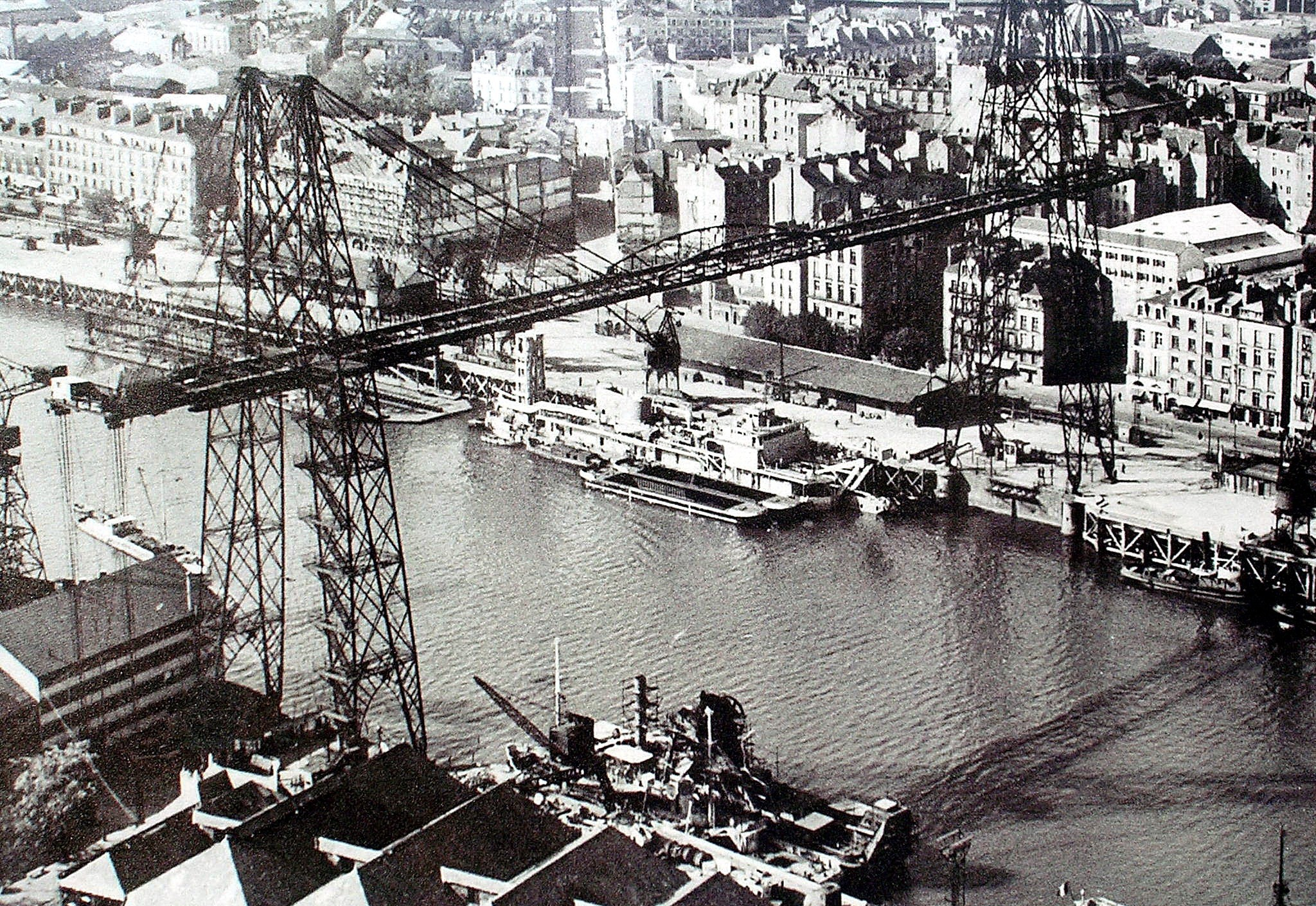
Aerial view of the bridge

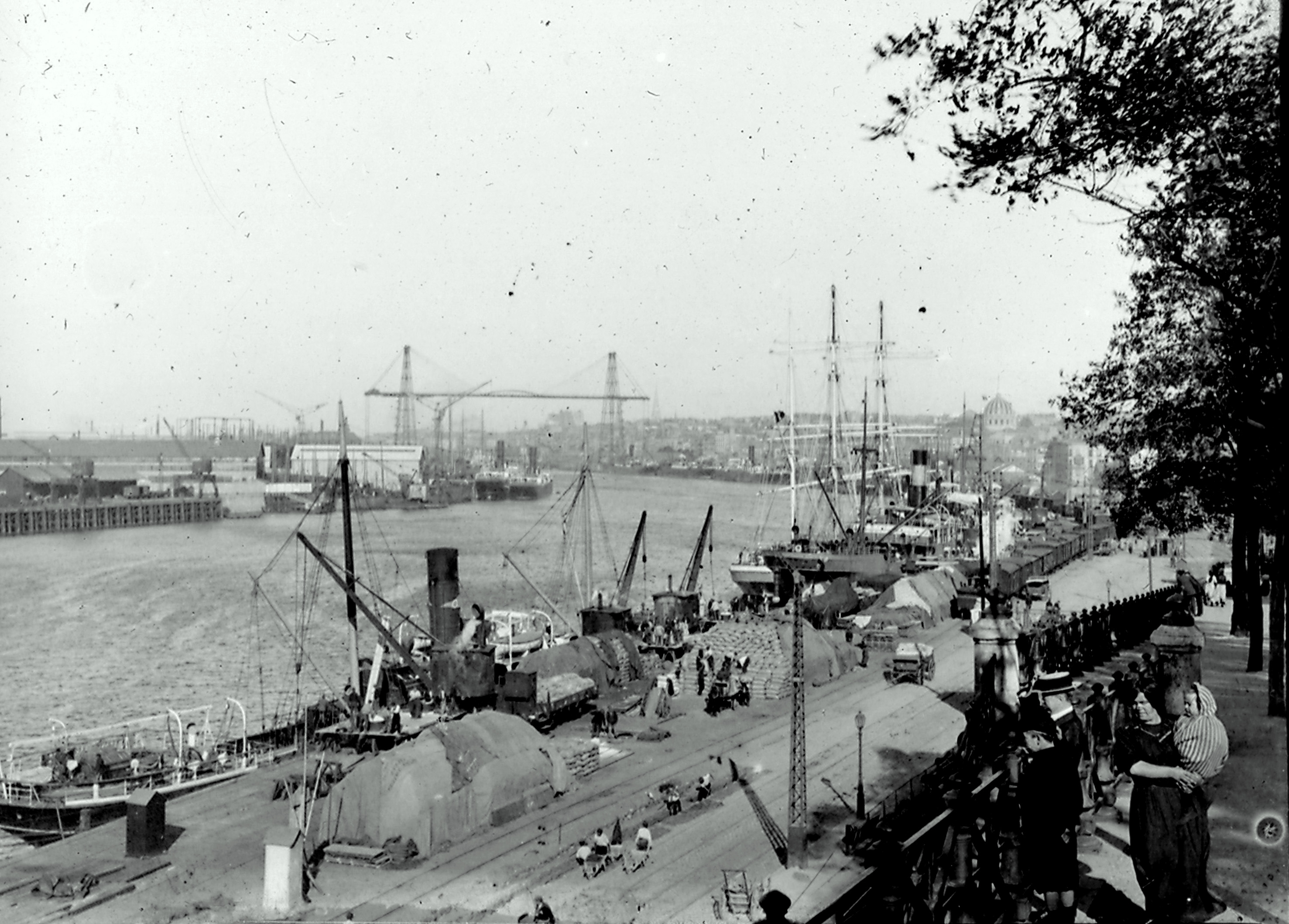
View along the Loire in 1912

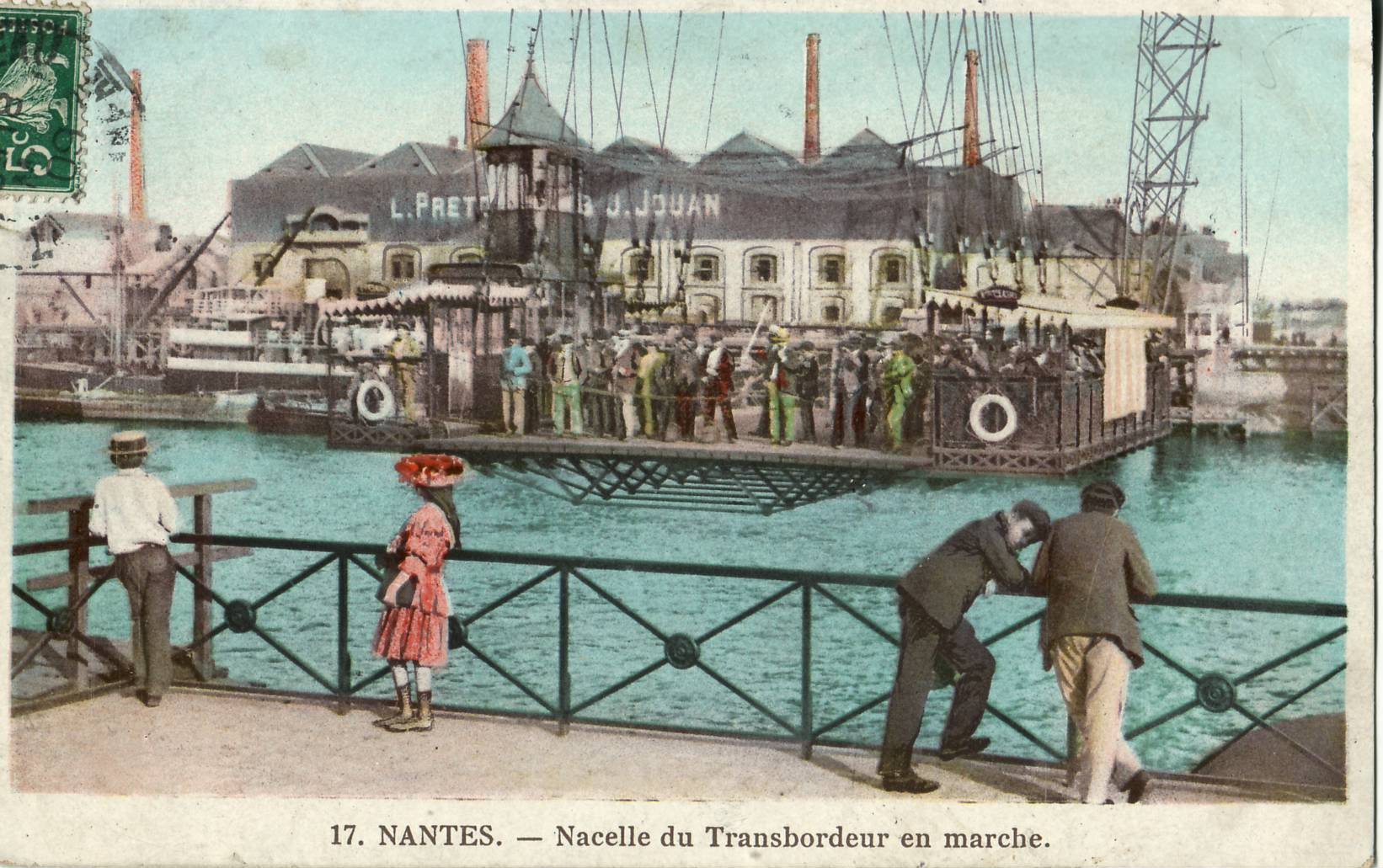
The suspended gondola carrying passengers

== Legacy and remains ==
The bridge was depicted in works by writers Julien Gracq, Armel de Wismes, and René Guy Cadou, as well as painter René Goulet. In 1925, stunt performer Willy Wolf died after diving from the top of the bridge deck.

In 1982, director Jacques Demy recreated the bridge using a glass shot matte painting for the opening sequence of Une chambre en ville.

Concrete foundations and steel anchor points remain visible on both riverbanks near the Anne de Bretagne Bridge. A plaque on the Quai de la Fosse marks the location.

Surviving piers and anchor points

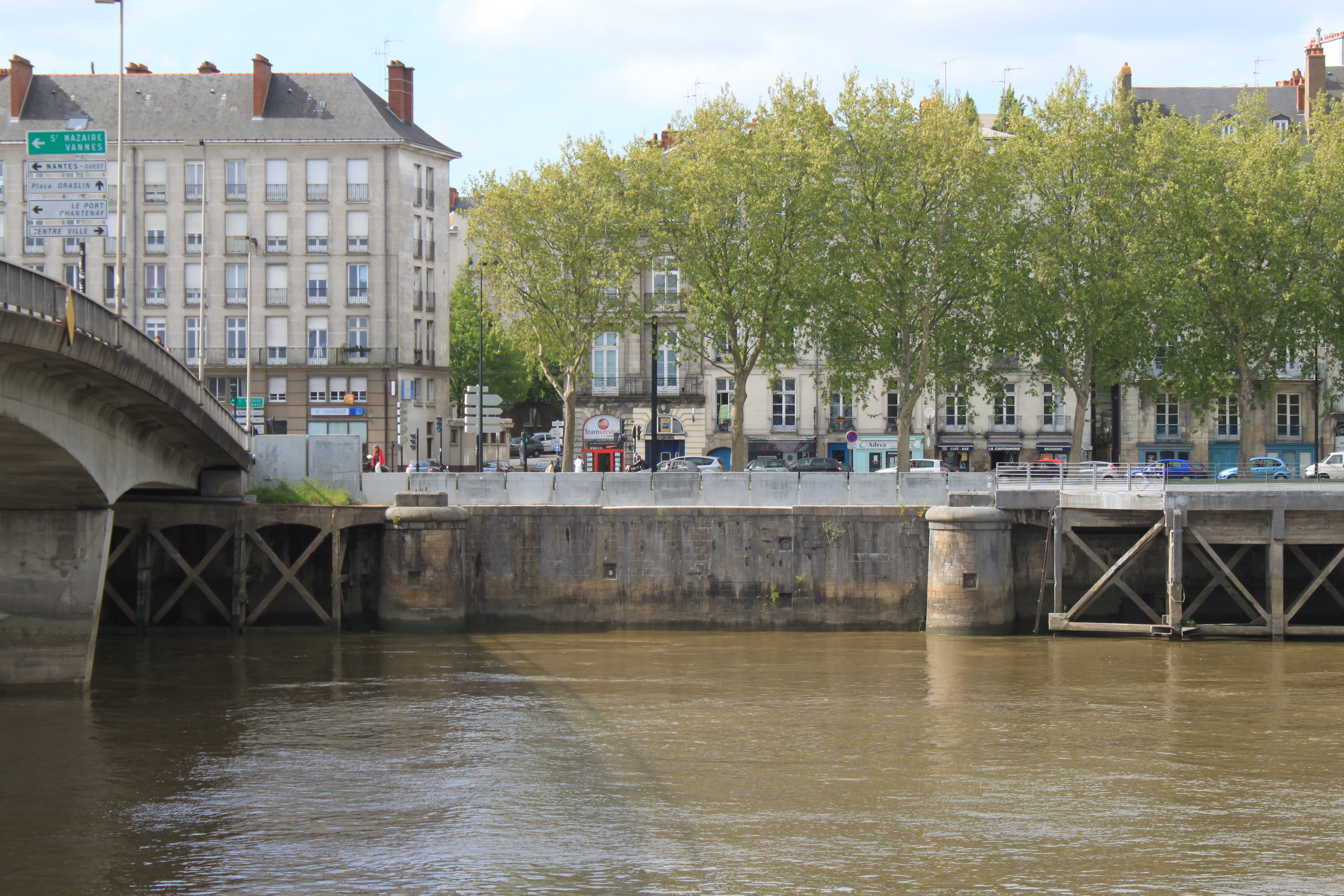
Piers on Quai de la Fosse (right bank)

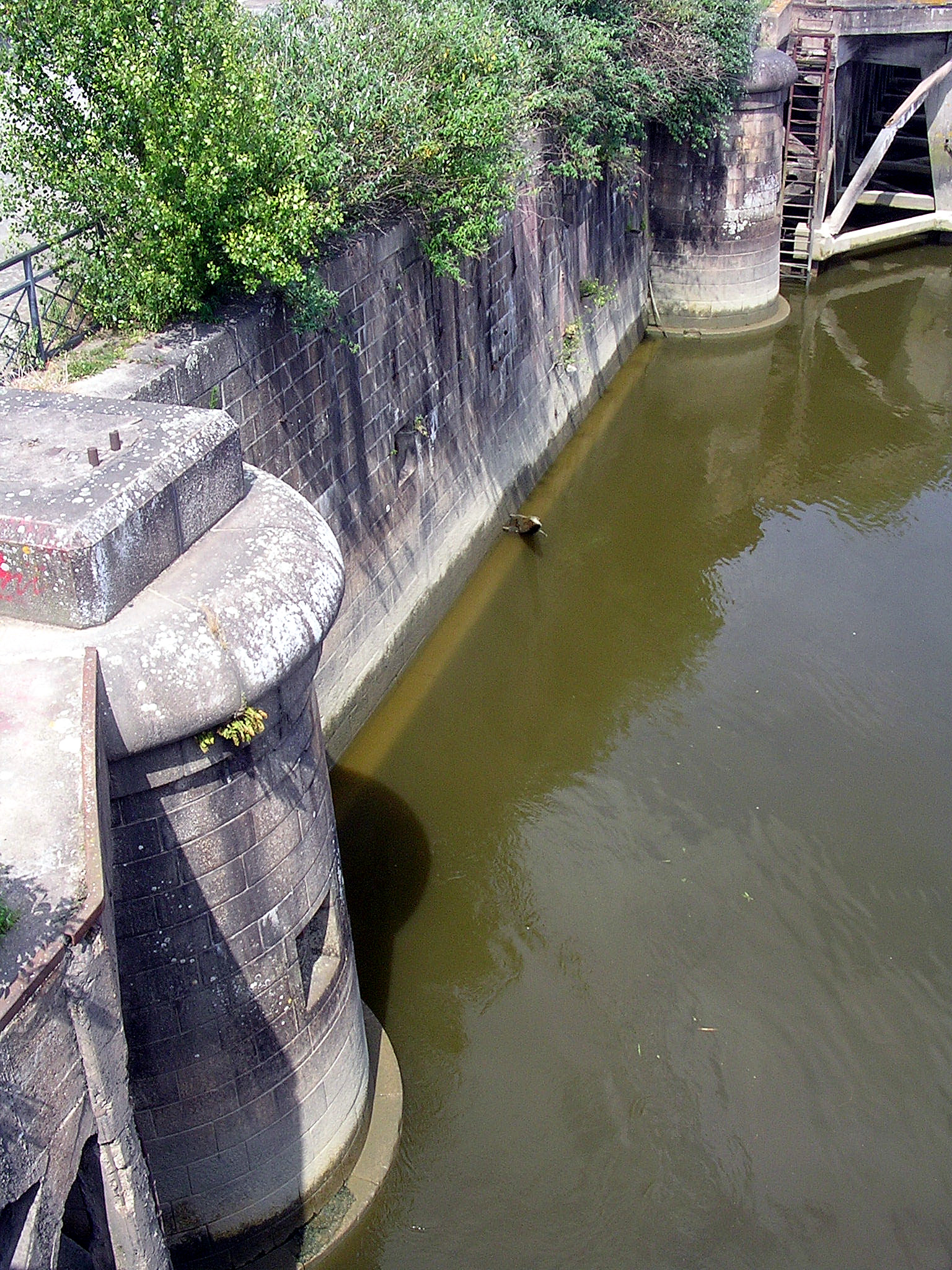
Detail of right-bank pier

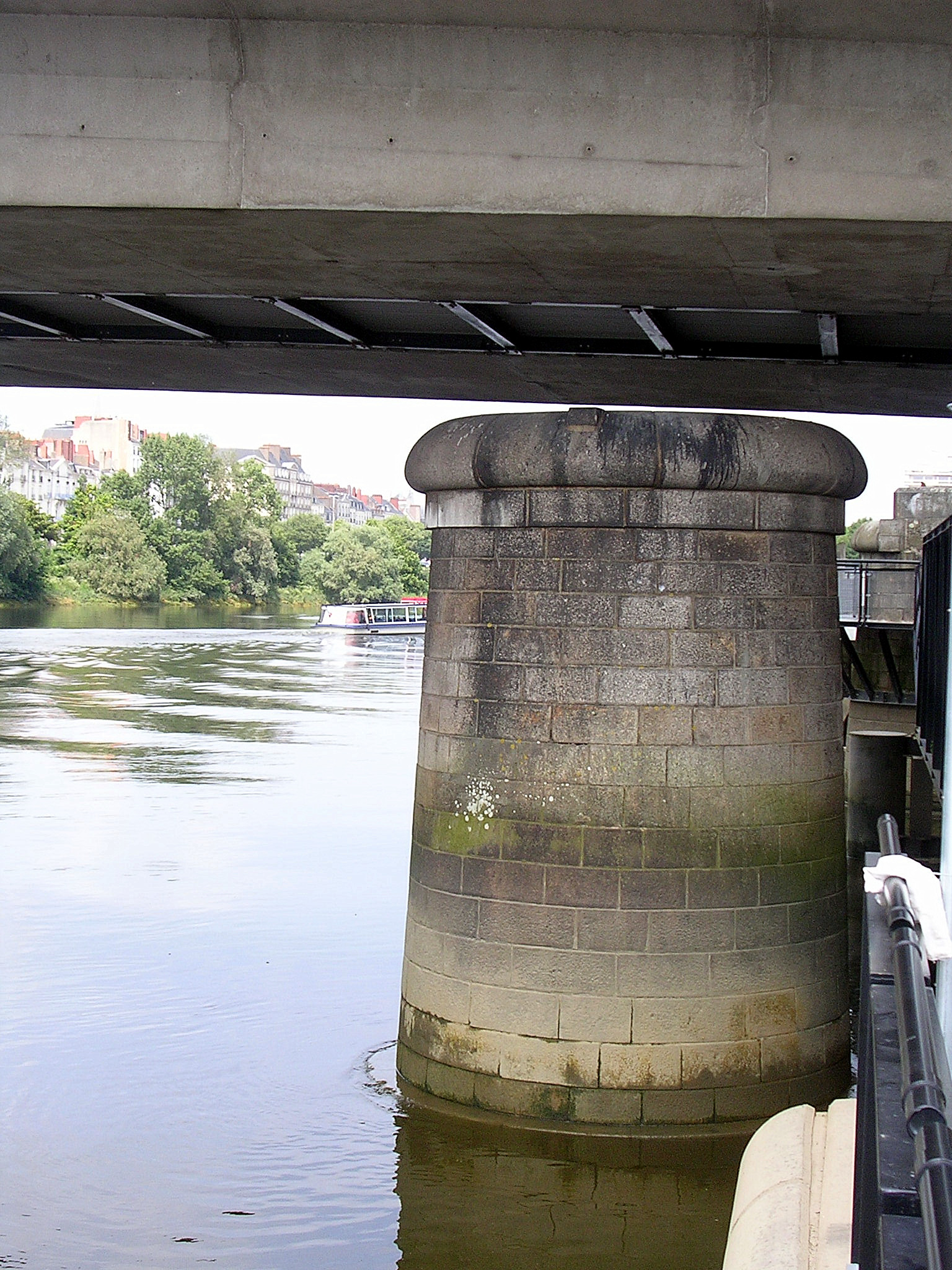
Left-bank pier under Anne de Bretagne Bridge

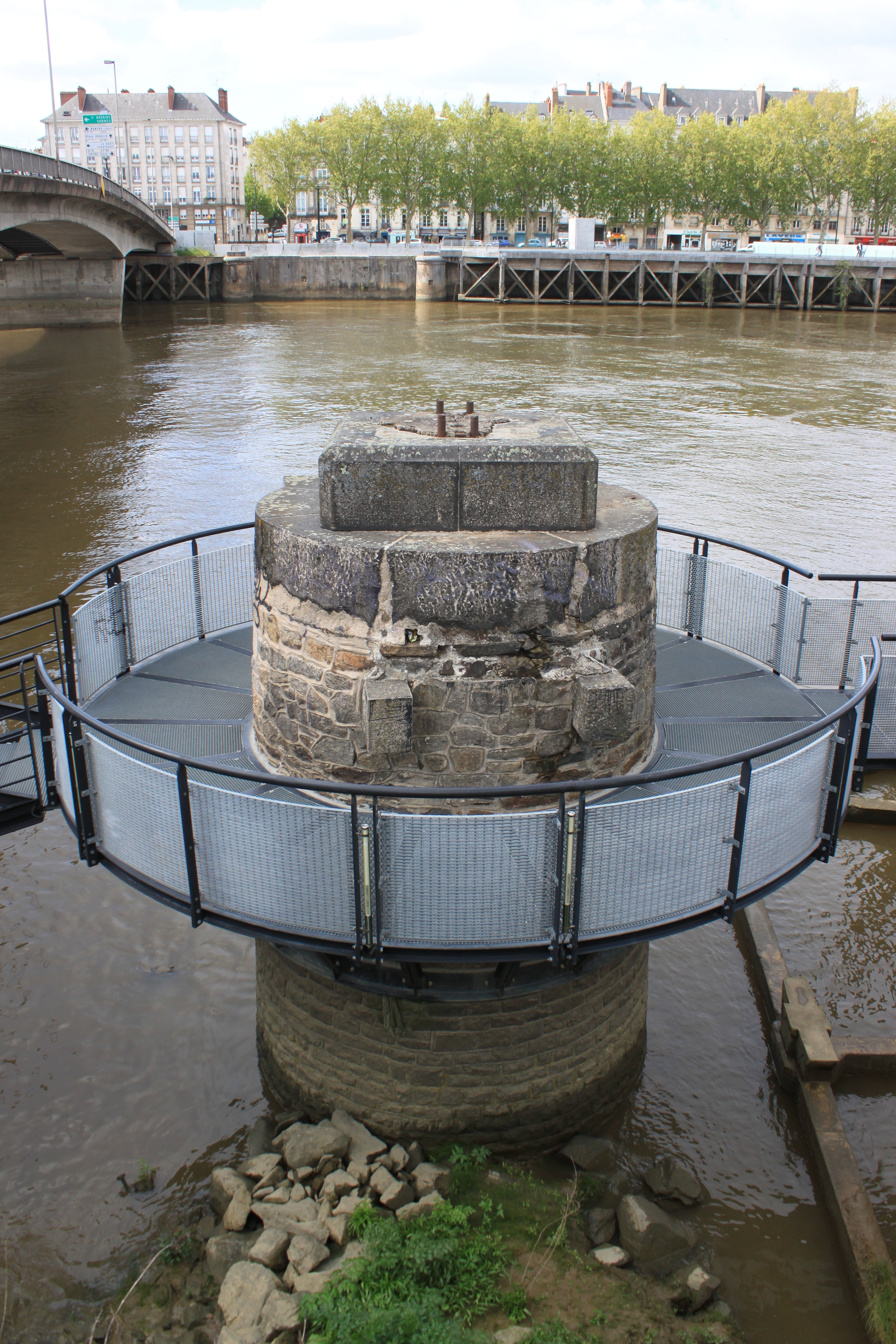
Left-bank pylon base showing anchor rods

== See also ==
- Anne de Bretagne Bridge
- Transporter bridge
- List of transporter bridges
