= Rouen Transporter Bridge =

Former transporter bridge in Rouen, France

Rouen Transporter Bridge Pont transbordeur de Rouen
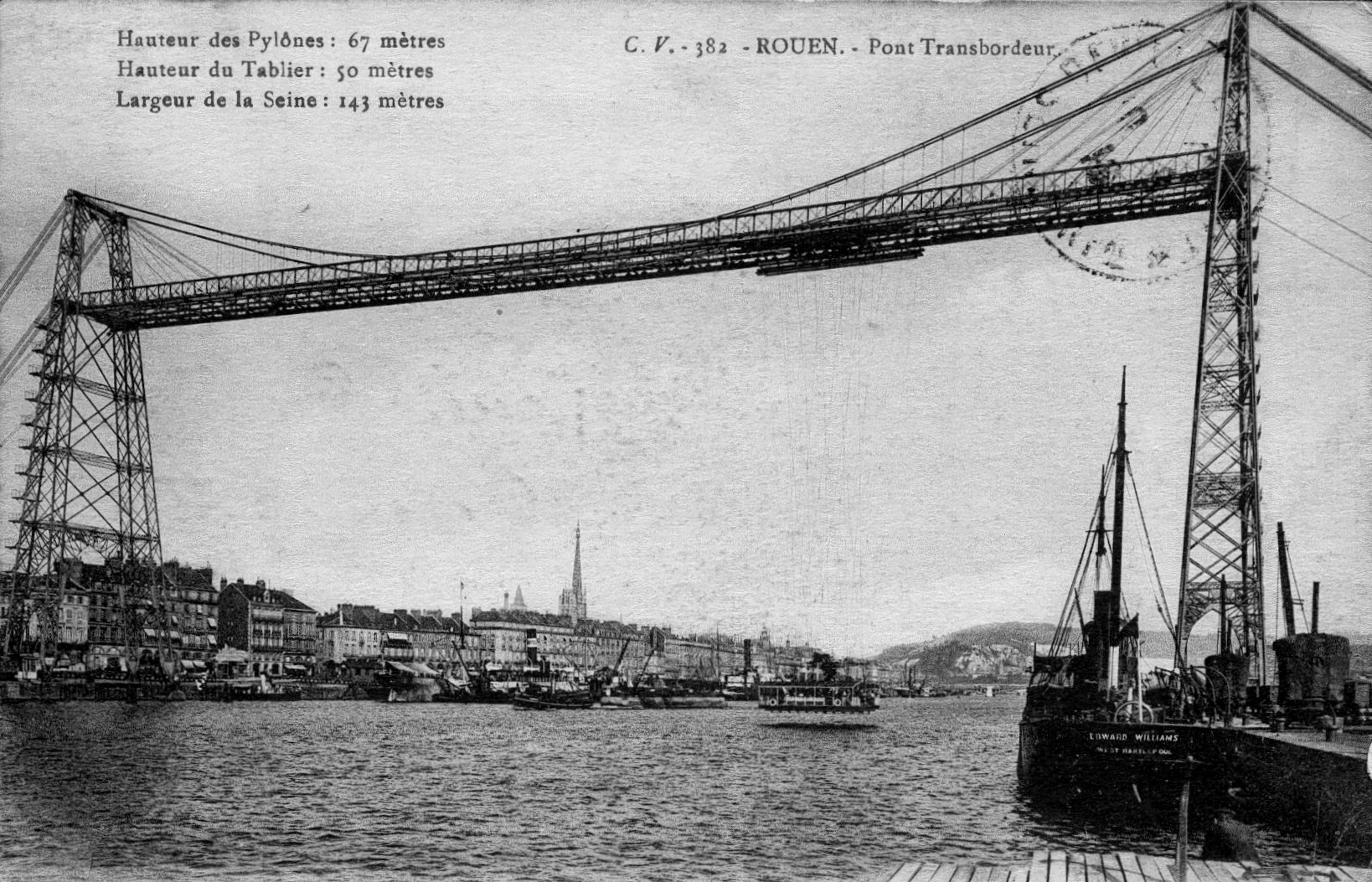
- The transporter bridge in Rouen, before 1914
- Coordinates: 49.439722°N 1.081111°E
- Carries: Pedestrians, cycles, and light vehicles
- Crosses: Seine
- Locale: Rouen, France
- Official name: Pont transbordeur de Rouen

Characteristics
- Material: Steel
- Total length: 143 metres (469 ft)
- Height: 70 metres (230 ft)
- Clearance above: 51 metres (167 ft)

History
- Designer: Ferdinand Arnodin
- Opened: 15 September 1899
- Closed: 9 June 1940

Location
- Interactive map of Rouen Transporter Bridge

The Rouen Transporter Bridge (Pont transbordeur de Rouen) was a transporter bridge that spanned the Seine in Rouen, France. It connected the Quai Gaston-Boulet on the right bank to the Quai de la Presqu'île-Rollet on the left bank. Until its destruction in 1940, it was the final bridge to cross the Seine before its estuary.

The city of Rouen decided to erect the bridge on 23 September 1895 to improve communication between the banks, which were then served by only three other bridges. Designed by engineer Ferdinand Arnodin, construction began in the autumn of 1897. It opened on 15 September 1899, becoming the second transporter bridge in the world to be put into service after the Vizcaya Bridge in Spain.

== Technical details ==
The bridge had a span of 143 metres (469 ft) and a total height of 70 metres (230 ft), providing a shipping clearance of 51 metres (167 ft). This height allowed large sailing ships to reach the maritime quays of the port of Rouen. It was a semi-rigid suspended bridge type with rectilinear decking and ground-anchored stay cables, a technique Arnodin also used for the transporter bridges in Brest and Rochefort.

The superstructure featured two walkways on either side of the deck, one of which was open to pedestrians and provided a panoramic view of the Seine. The traveling car ran on wheels along two rails and was powered by two electric motors—the Rouen bridge being the first of its type to use electricity.

The gondola measured 130 square meters and had a load capacity of 15 tons. It featured a central lane for vehicles, flanked by two weather shelters: one for first-class passengers (glass-enclosed with benches) and one for second-class passengers (standing room only). Over the years, the gondola was painted in various colors, including white and green, and later salmon.

== History ==
During World War I, Ferdinand Arnodin famously made the bridge crossings free of charge as a patriotic gesture. Several notable events took place at the bridge: on 5 May 1912, aviator Marcel Cavelier flew an airplane underneath the bridge to win the Claudel Prize, and the Polish diver Willy Wolf performed a remarkable jump from the structure on 29 March 1925.

With the exception of a closure for major maintenance between May 1926 and July 1930, the bridge remained in continuous operation until the early stages of World War II. On 9 June 1940, French soldiers demolished the bridge by explosives to hinder the advance of the German army. The destruction occurred in great confusion; as navigation had not been halted on the river, the collapsing deck crushed a tugboat, the Houdon, which was carrying refugees and sank immediately.

== Gallery ==
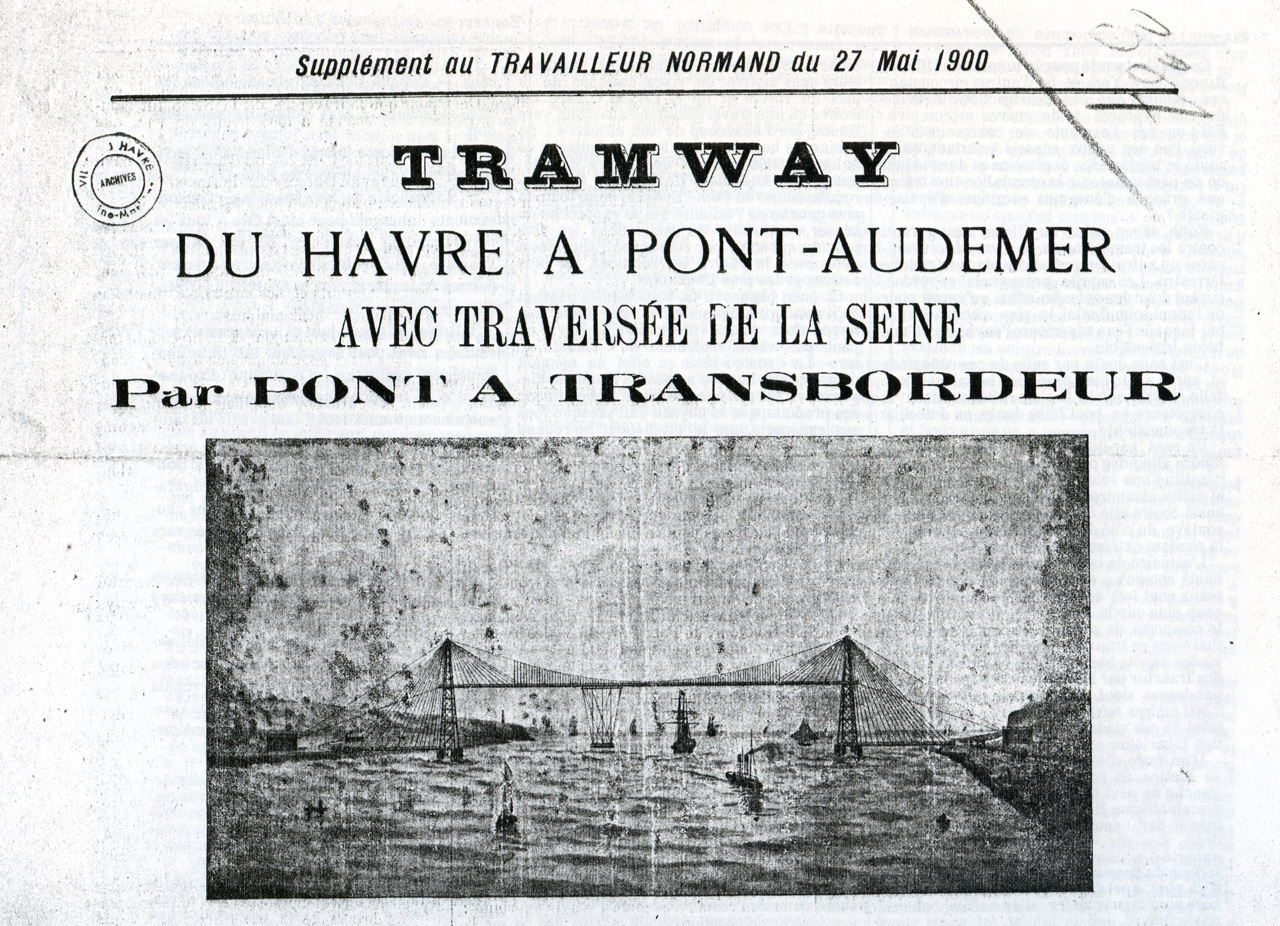
Advertisement for the transporter bridge

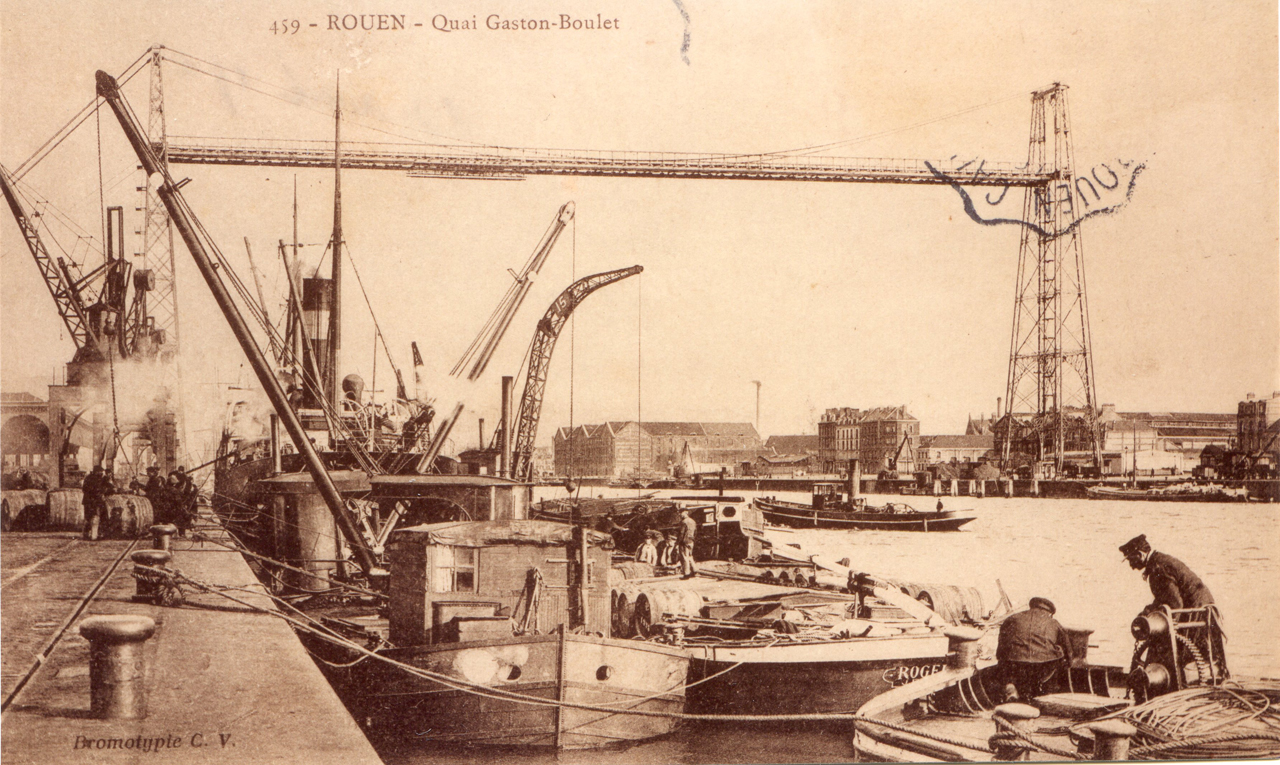
Quai Gaston-Boulet with the bridge, c. 1903–1904

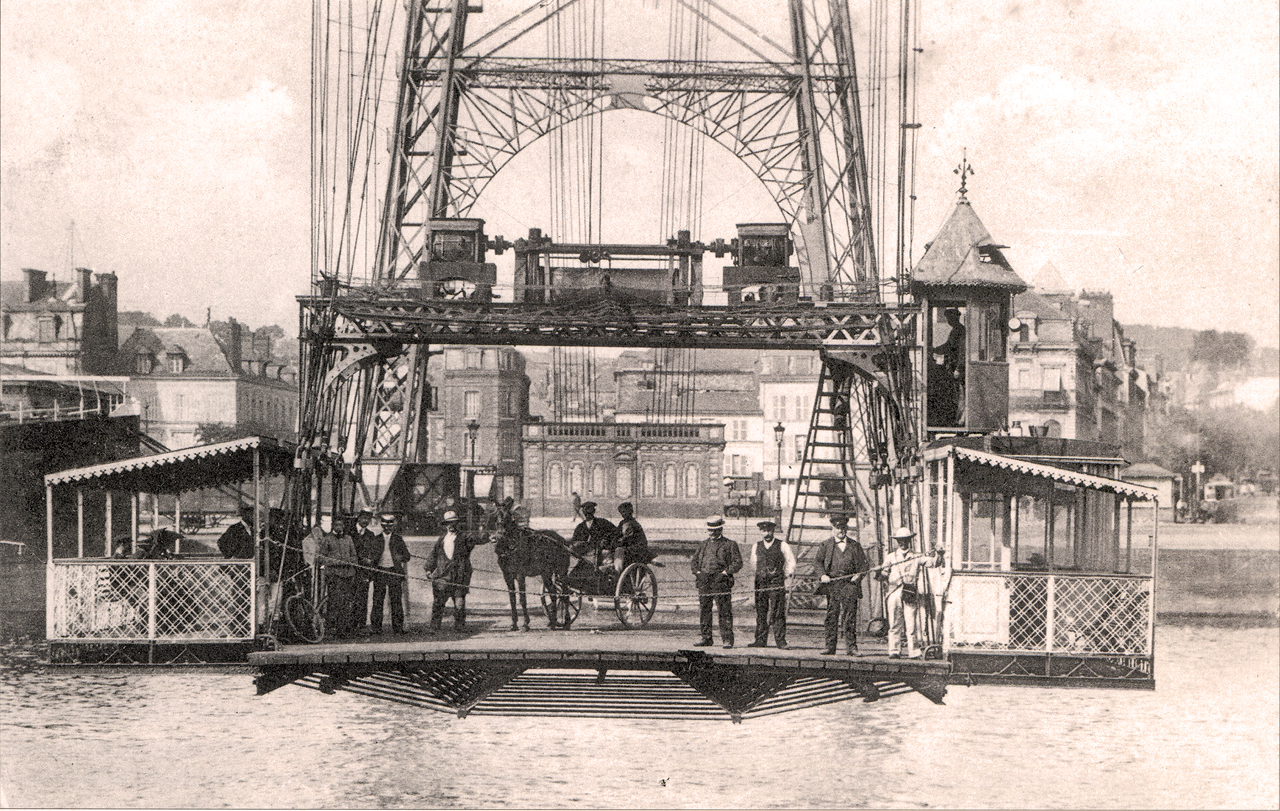
The bridge's gondola, showing the 1st and 2nd class shelters

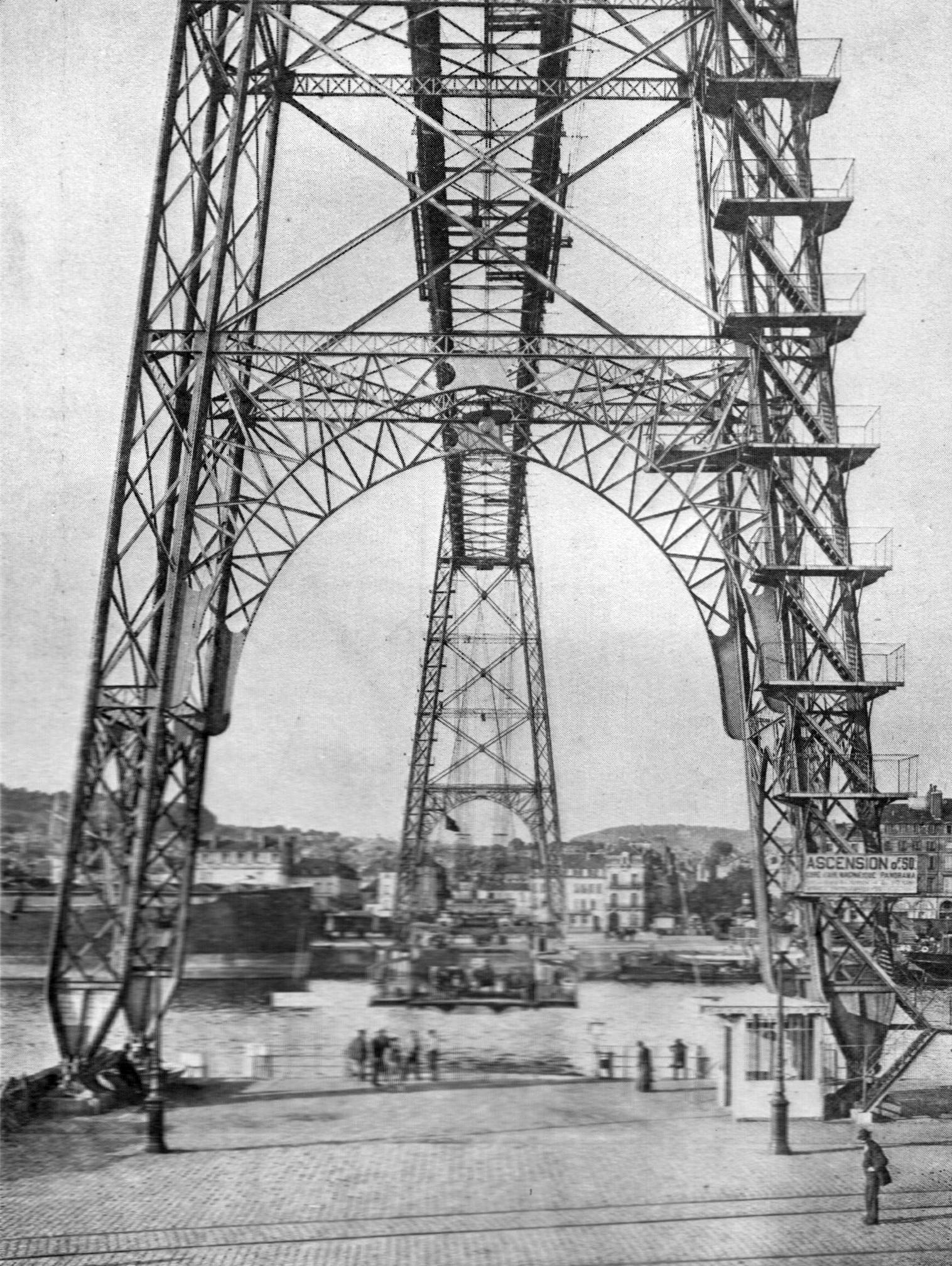
The gondola approaching the ramp

== See also ==
- List of transporter bridges

== Bibliography ==
- Michel Croguennec, "Les Cent ans du premier pont transbordeur de France", Bulletin des Amis des monuments rouennais 1999-2000, Rouen, 2000.
- Jacques Chapuis, "Les transports urbains dans l'agglomération rouennaise", Chemins de fer régionaux et urbains, No. 72, 1966.
- Jacques Sigot, La France des transbordeurs, Éditions Alan Sutton, 2005. ISBN 2-84910-262-8
- Hervé Bertin, Petits trains et tramways haut-normands, Cénomane/La Vie du Rail, 1994. ISBN 2-905596-48-1
