= Pont Anne-de-Bretagne =

Anne de Bretagne Bridge Pont Anne-de-Bretagne
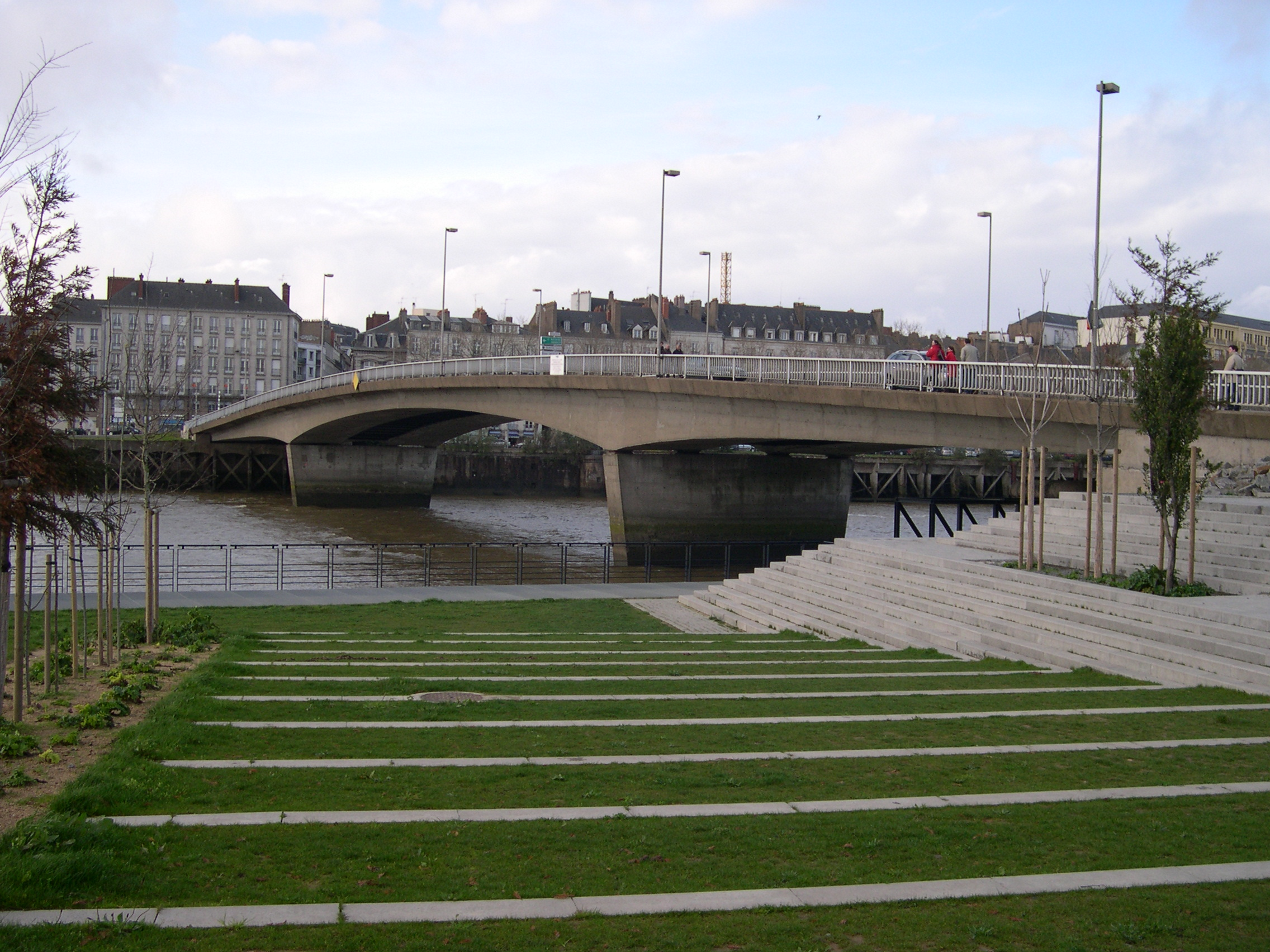
- The Anne de Bretagne bridge seen from the Parc des Chantiers
- Coordinates: 47.208296°N 1.565933°W
- Carries: Motor vehicles, tram, cyclists, and pedestrians
- Crosses: Loire (Madeleine branch)
- Locale: Nantes, France
- Official name: Pont Anne-de-Bretagne

Characteristics
- Material: Prestressed concrete (current) / Steel (new deck)
- Total length: 160 metres (520 ft)
- Width: 18.5 metres (61 ft) (current) / 53 metres (174 ft) (2027)

History
- Designer: Dietmar Feichtinger Architectes (renovation)
- Opened: 1975

Location
- Interactive map of Anne de Bretagne Bridge

The Anne de Bretagne Bridge (Pont Anne-de-Bretagne; Pont Anna Vreizh) is a bridge spanning the bras de la Madeleine, a branch of the Loire river in Nantes, France. Named in honour of Anne of Brittany, it connects the city centre to the Île de Nantes. The renovation work on the Anne de Bretagne Bridge began in 2024 in order to address ecological challenges. The complete opening of the new Anne de Bretagne Bridge, which will be the widest in Europe, is scheduled for the end of 2027.

== Location ==
As the westernmost urban bridge in Nantes, it connects the Quai de la Fosse, on the right bank, to the Boulevard Léon-Bureau, on the island (in the Prairie au Duc district). It stands on the site of the former Nantes transporter bridge, designed by the French architect Ferdinand Arnodin, built in 1903 and dismantled in 1958.

The bridge provides access to major cultural sites on the island, including the Machines of the Isle of Nantes, the Parc des Chantiers, and the Memorial to the Abolition of Slavery located on the right bank.

== History ==
The current bridge, completed in 1975, is a beam bridge supported by two main concrete piers. Historically, the site was the location of a famous transporter bridge that served as a symbol of the city's industrial heritage before its demolition.

== Renovation and expansion (2024–2027) ==
A major transformation project began in March 2024 to accommodate two new tramway lines (Lines 6 and 7). By 2027, the bridge's width will have tripled to reach 53 metres (174 ft), making it the widest bridge in Europe.

The project emphasises environmental sustainability by reusing the existing concrete piers, saving approximately 4,800 tons of concrete and reducing the carbon footprint by 6,000 tons of CO_{2} equivalent.

The new monumental steel structure, weighing 3,100 tons and measuring 150 metres (490 ft) in length, was manufactured in Italy by Cimolai (company) at their Monfalcone plant. Due to its exceptional dimensions, it was transported to Nantes by sea. The journey, which began in October 2025, faced significant delays due to severe winter storms in the Mediterranean and the Atlantic (including storms Alessio, Barbara, and Nils).

To ensure a safe crossing of the Bay of Biscay, the barge was loaded onto the specialized semi-submersible heavy-lift ship Trustee (IMO 8902955) in Cádiz. After a final technical stop in Lorient on 25 February 2026 to wait for favorable wind conditions, the structure finally arrived in Nantes on 7 March 2026.

The final towage up the Loire estuary from Saint-Nazaire was performed by Boluda tugboats, including the Menez-Hom and Menez-Bre, as well as the harbour tugs Pornic, Mirage, and Ouragan. The arrival was celebrated by crowds of residents as the barge performed a spectacular turnaround maneuver near Trentemoult before reaching the construction site.

The work was entrusted to GTM Ouest, a subsidiary of Vinci Construction. The completion of the works is scheduled for the end of 2027.

=== Construction timeline ===
- 11 March 2024: Official start of construction.
- October 2025: Departure of the steel deck from Italy.
- Winter 2025–2026: Two-month delay due to Atlantic storms.
- 25 February 2026: Stopover in Lorient harbor.
- 7 March 2026: Historical arrival of the deck in Nantes.
- Spring 2026: Beginning of the lifting operations to place the deck on its final supports using tidal hydraulics.
- Late 2027: Expected completion and commissioning.

== Gallery ==
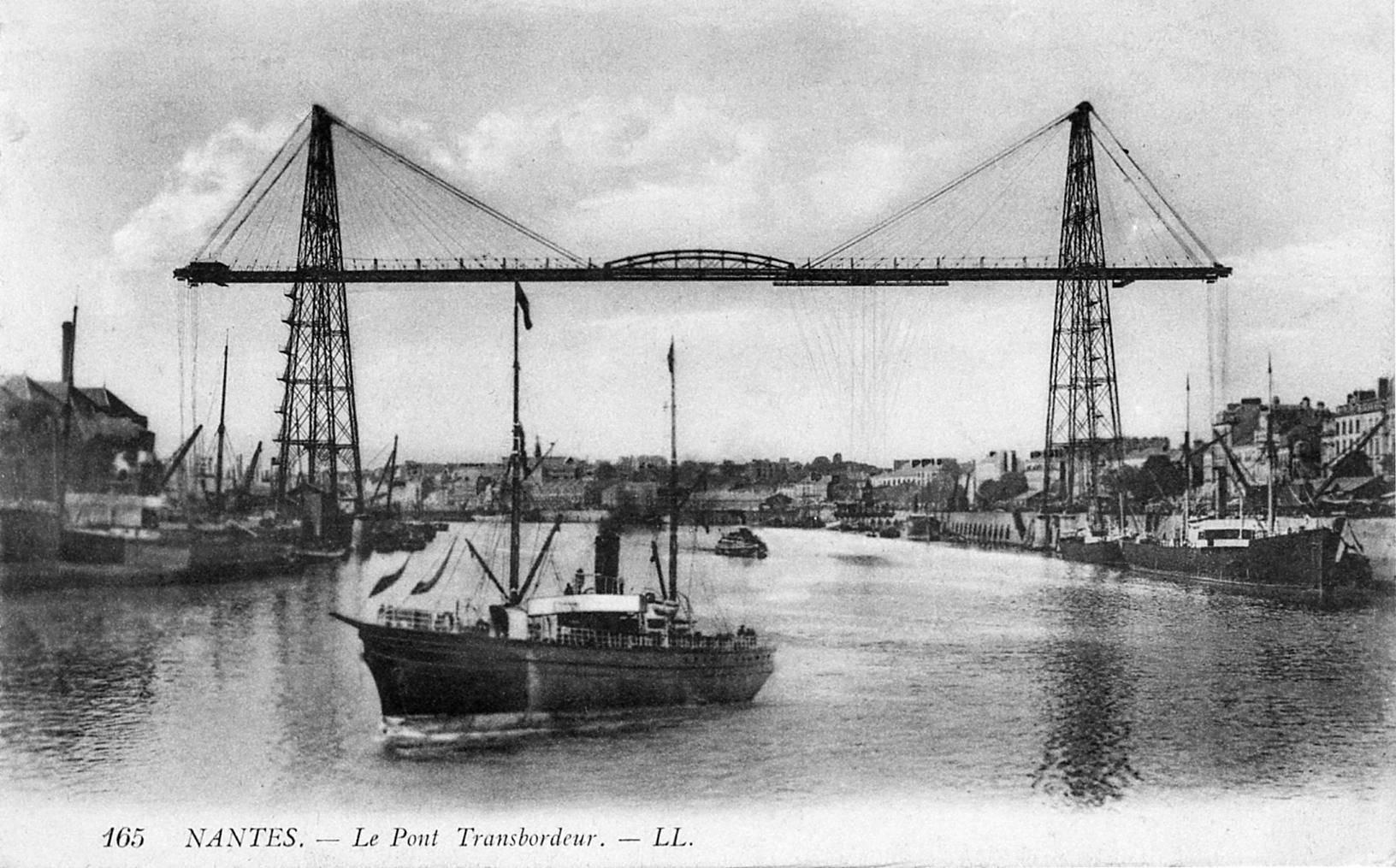
The historic Nantes transporter bridge at the same site (c. 1900).

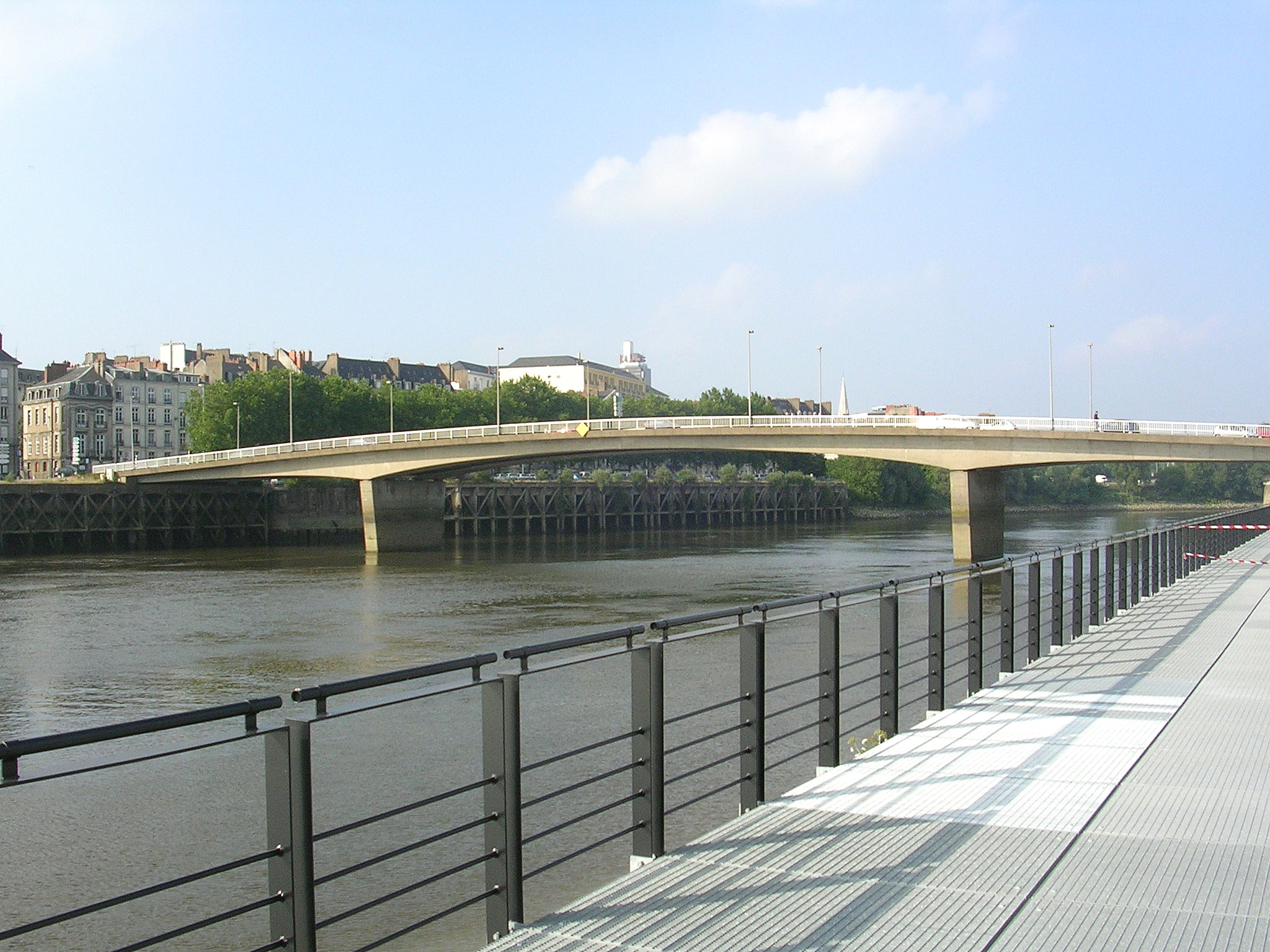
The original 1975 bridge structure.
Installation of the steel deck (2026)

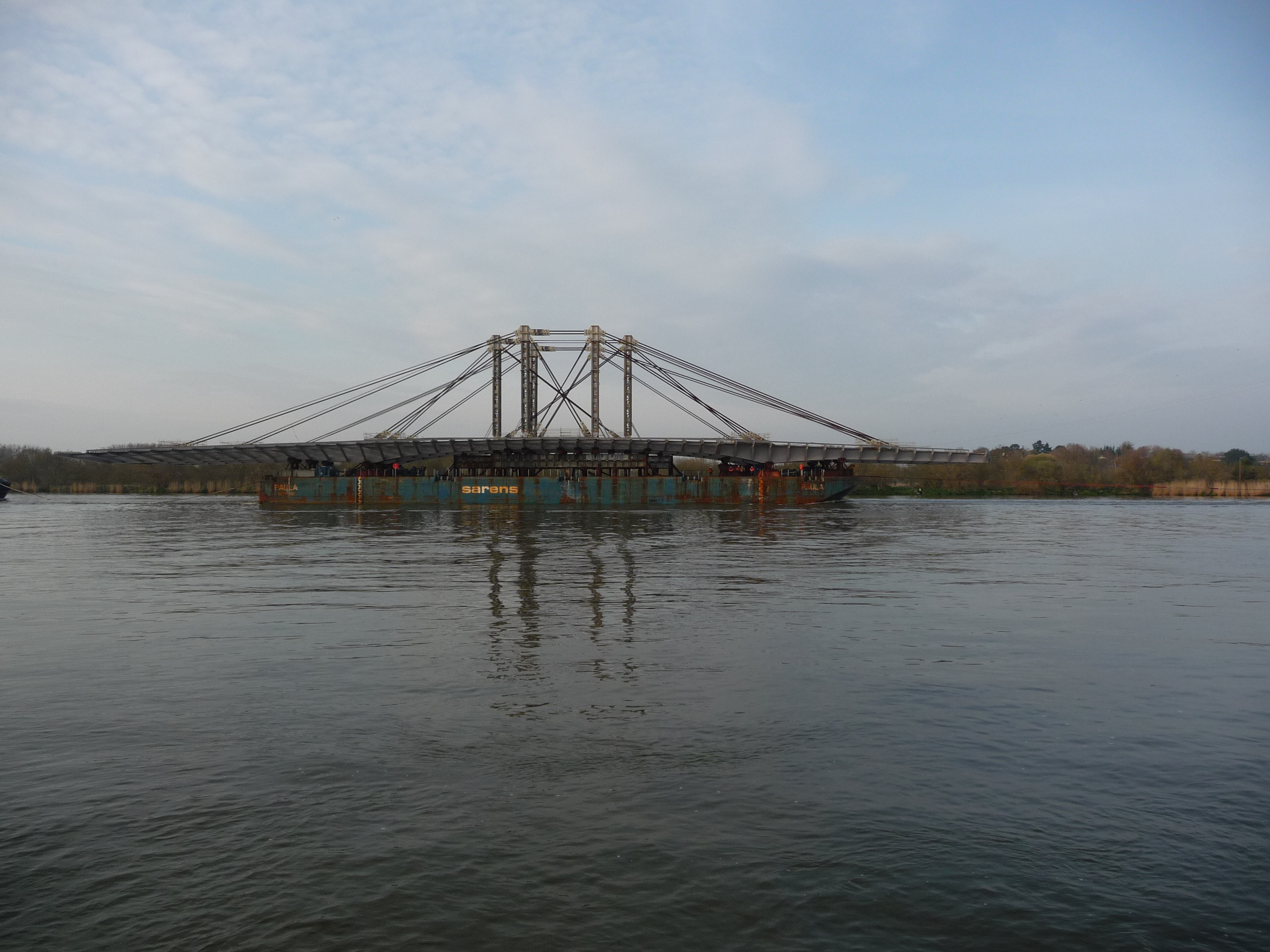
The new steel deck on the barge Paula during its ascent of the Loire.

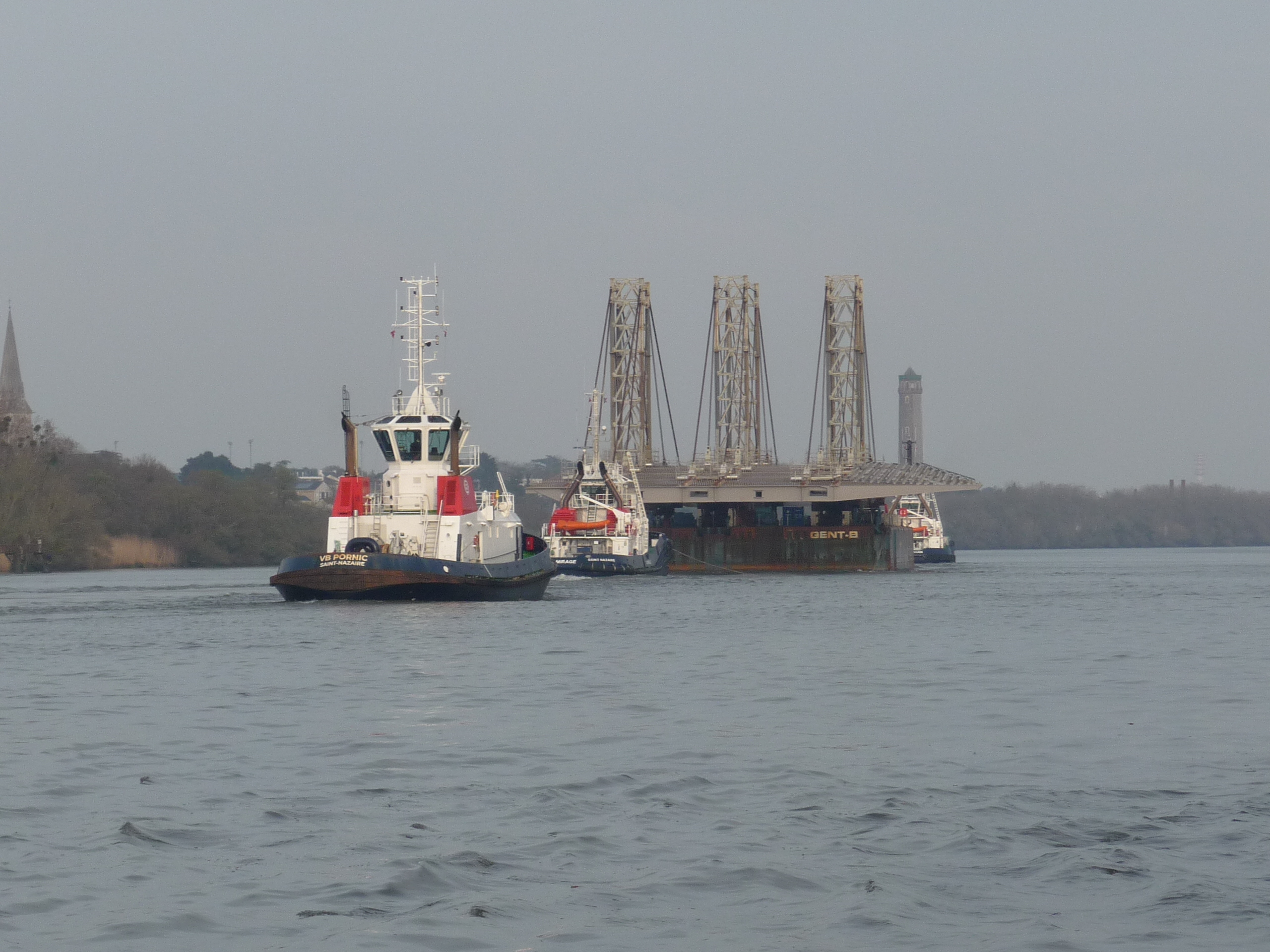
The barge escorted by tugboats Pornic, Mirage, and Ouragan.

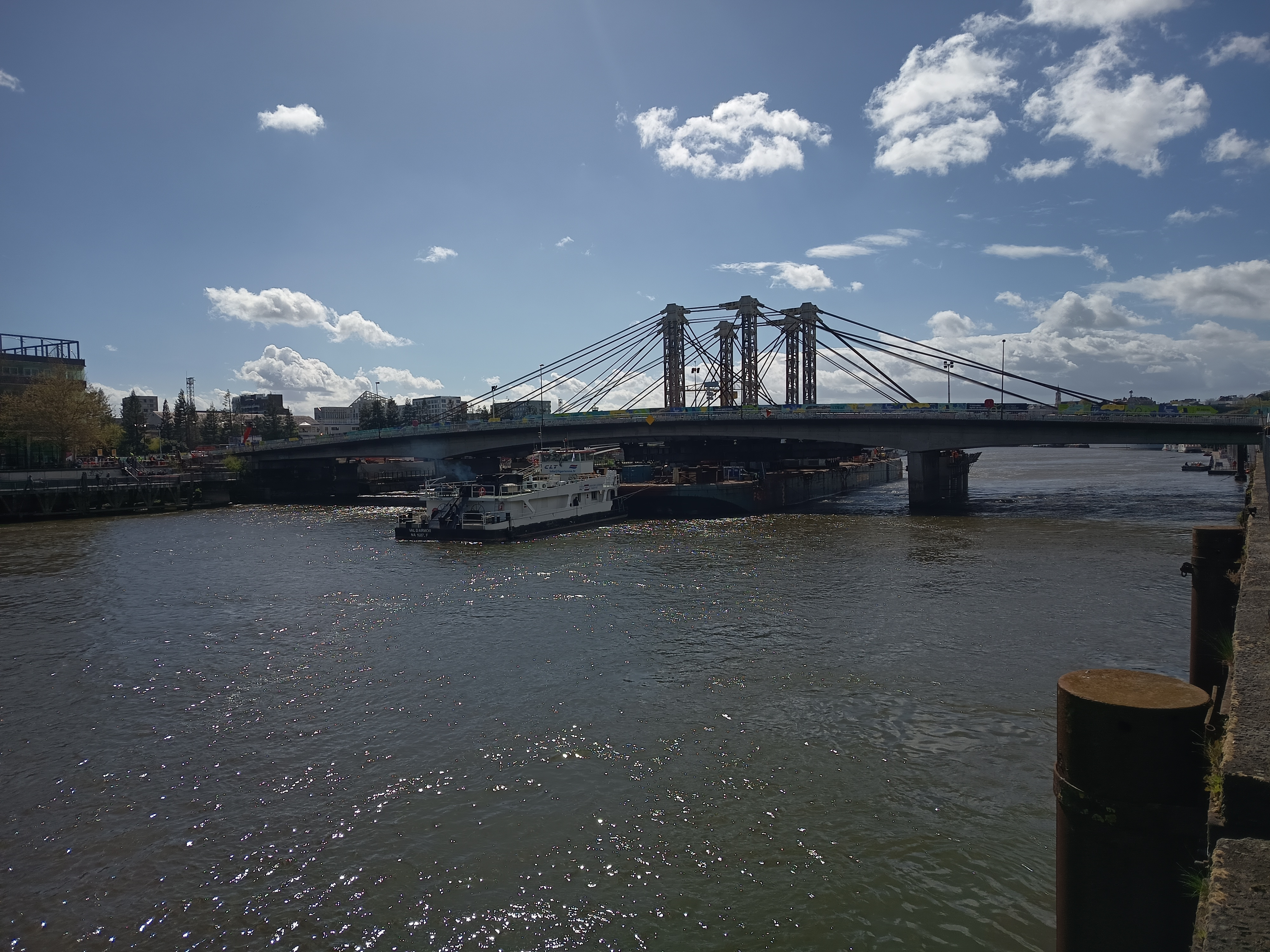
The barge uses the falling tide as a natural hydraulic lift to slowly lower the deck with millimetric precision.

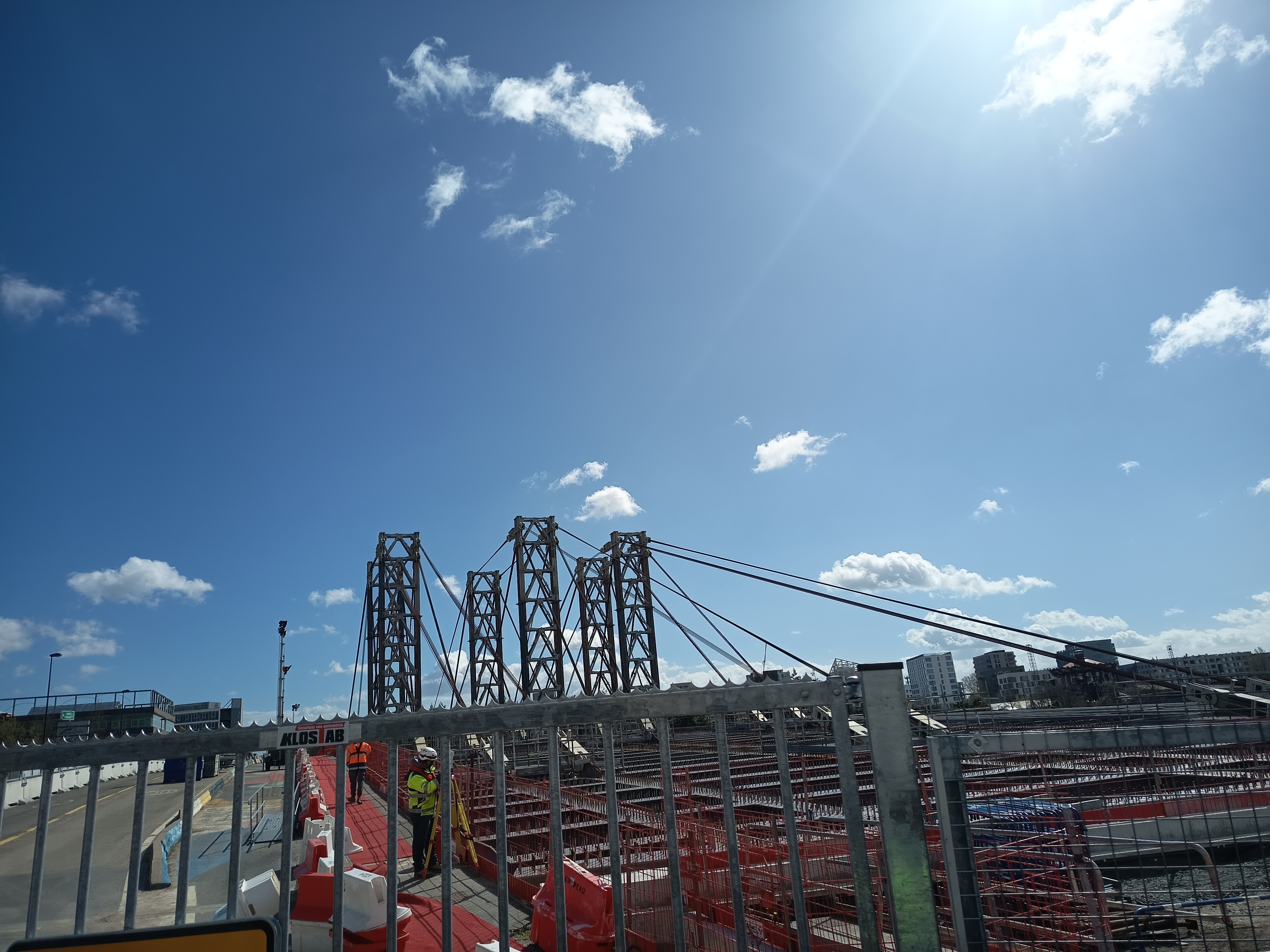
The 3,000-tonne deck structure being positioned onto the pre-existing concrete piers; the pylons and stay cables of the steel supporting structure are also visible.

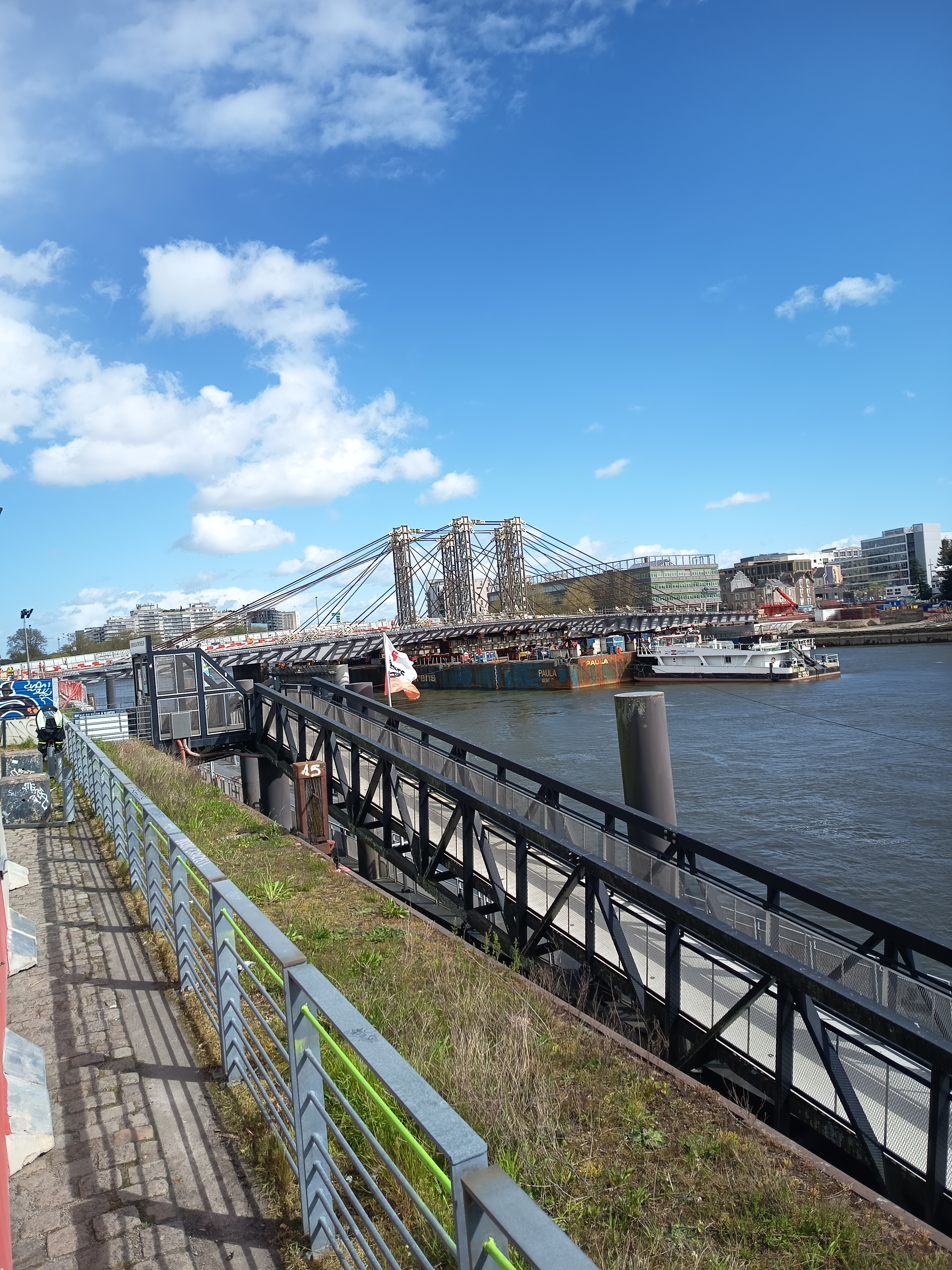
View of the lowering process facilitated by the tidal shift.

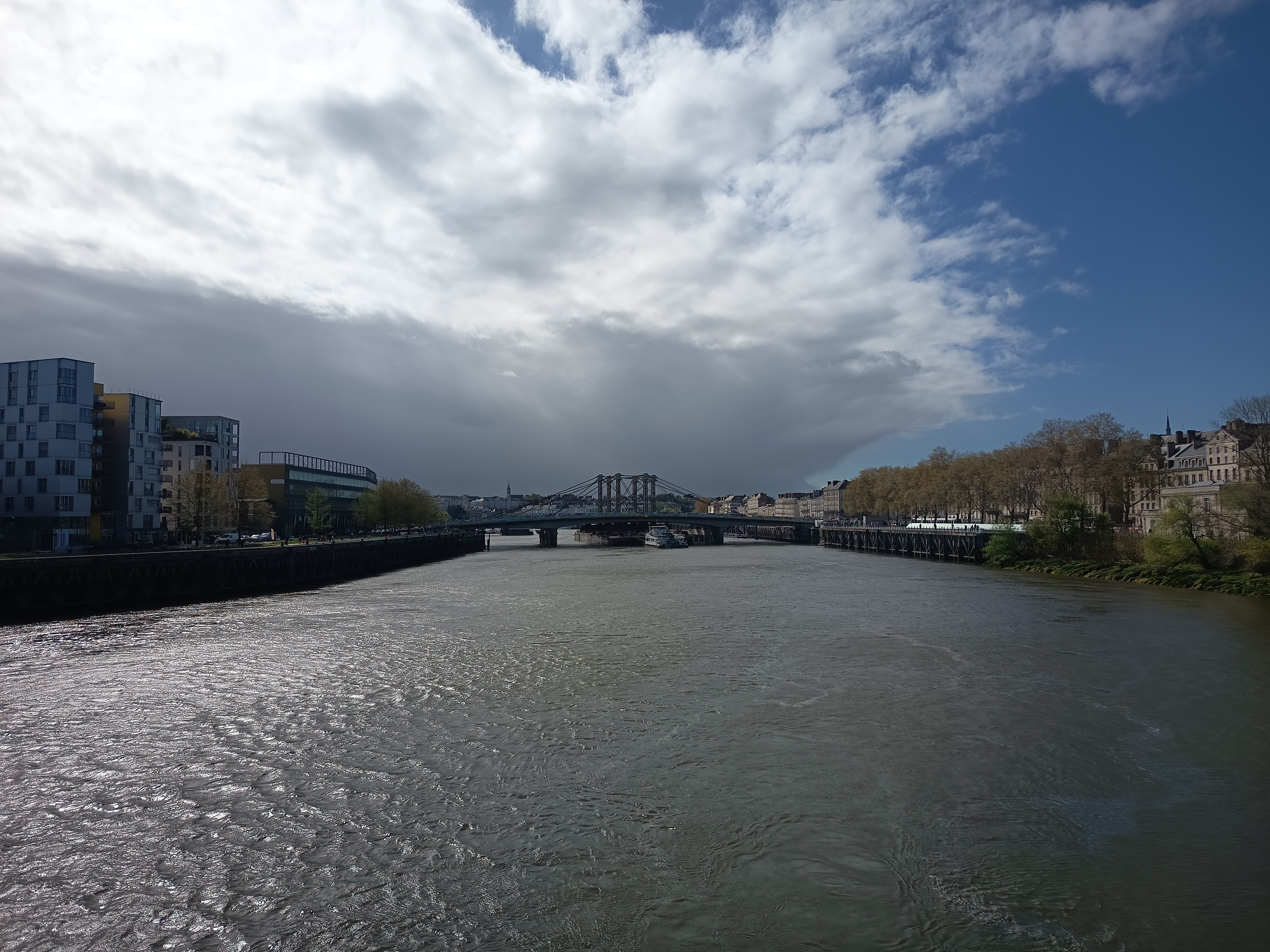
Wide shot of the alignment between the steel deck and concrete supports (viewed from Passerelle Victor-Schœlcher.
