= Newport Transporter Bridge =

Historic bridge across the Usk in Wales, opened in 1906

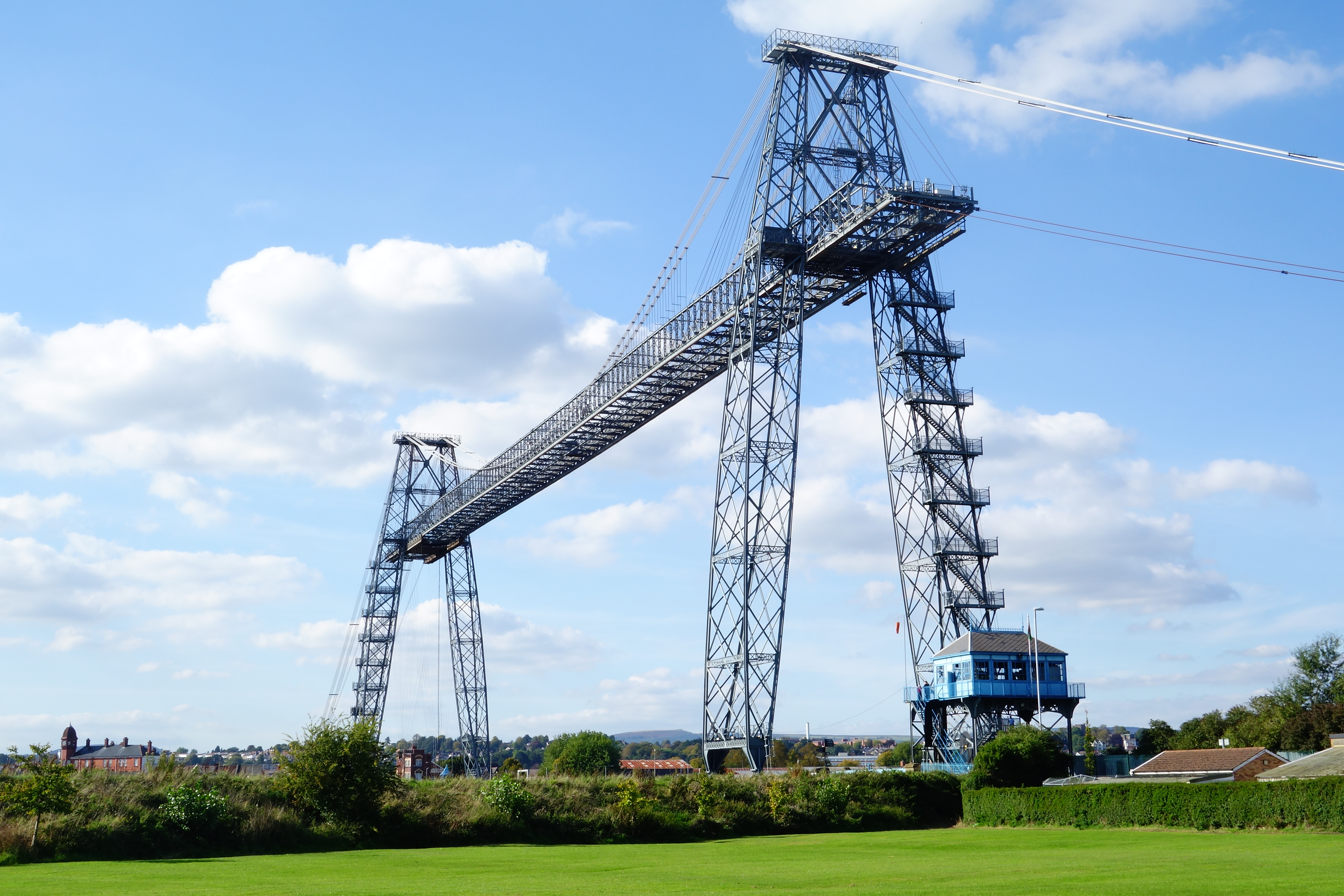
- The bridge viewed from Coronation Park
- Coordinates: 51.57064°N 2.98556°W
- Carries: Motor vehicles, cyclists and pedestrians including buses and multi sized lorries.
- Crosses: River Usk
- Locale: Newport, Wales
- Official name: Newport Transporter Bridge
- Maintained by: Newport City Council
- Heritage status: Grade I

Characteristics
- Design: Transporter bridge
- Total length: 236m (774.28 ft)
- Width: Three cars (gondola) (total width 108 ft / 33 m)
- Longest span: 196.56m (644.88 ft)

History
- Designer: Ferdinand Arnodin
- Opened: 12 September 1906

Statistics
- Toll: Adult Single – £1.50; Adult Return – £2.00; Child Single – 50p Child Return – £1.00; Day Ticket (inc. unlimited trips on the gondola and walking across the top of the bridge) – £4.00

Location
- Interactive map of Newport Transporter Bridge

The Newport Transporter Bridge (Welsh: Pont Gludo Casnewydd) is a transporter bridge that crosses the River Usk in Newport, South East Wales. The bridge is the lowest crossing on the river. Built in 1906, it is a Grade I listed structure.

Only a few dozen transporter bridges were ever built, and fewer than 10 remain in use worldwide. The Newport bridge has been the only operational transporter bridge in Britain since 2019 when the Tees Transporter Bridge was closed as unsafe.

It was closed in 2025 for extensive repairs, which are expected to wrap up in late 2026.

== History ==
The bridge was designed by French engineer Ferdinand Arnodin. It was built in 1906 and opened by Godfrey Charles Morgan, 1st Viscount Tredegar, on 12 September 1906. Newport Museum holds a silver cigar cutter which was presented to Viscount Tredegar on the day of the opening, as a memento of the occasion.

== Design ==
The design was chosen because the river banks are very low at the desired crossing point (a few miles south of the city centre) where an ordinary bridge would need a very long approach ramp to attain sufficient height to allow ships to pass under, and a ferry could not be used during low tide at the site. The river is too narrow for a swing bridge or a bascule bridge (drawbridge).

== Principal dimensions ==
A Corporation of Newport drawing dated December 1902 is calibrated in metres. The height of the towers is 73.6 metres (241.5 ft), and the height to the underside of the main girder truss above the road level is 49.97 m (163.9 ft). The span between the centres of the towers is 196.56 m (644.9 ft), and the clearance between the towers is quoted as being 180.44 m (592 ft); however, including the cantilevered sections, the main girder truss gives the bridge an overall length of 236 m (774.3 ft). The distance between the centres of the anchorage caissons is 471.06 m (1,545.5 ft). Power to propel the transporter platform or gondola is provided by two 35 hp (26.1 kW) electric motors, which in turn drive a large winch, situated in an elevated winding house at the eastern end of the bridge. This winch is sufficient to drive the gondola through its 196.56 m (644.9 ft) total travel at a speed of 3 metres per second (9.8 ft/s).

The Newport Transporter is 5 m (16 ft) taller and 23 m (75 ft) less in overall length than the Tees Transporter Bridge. It also uses about 1,400 long tons (1,600 short tons) of steel compared to 2,600 long tons (2,900 short tons), not counting steel used in foundations or concrete anchors. This is largely because the Newport bridge uses cables to support and induce tension in its structure far more than does the Middlesbrough bridge.

The bridge is a Grade I listed structure, its Cadw listing describing it as "the oldest and largest of the three historic transporter bridges which remain in Britain, and also the largest of eight such bridges which remain worldwide".

== Other information ==
Today, the bridge is considered an “iconic symbol” of the city of Newport, particularly as a mark of its industrial heritage. As well as a working transport link, the bridge is also open as a tourist attraction – visitors could climb the towers and walk across the upper deck for a small charge. The bridge forms part of the classified highway network and is also where route 4 of the National Cycle Network crosses the River Usk and route 47 begins. It was the focal point of the local millennium celebrations of 2000, where fireworks were fired from its length, and has been featured in several movies and television shows. It was the centre-piece of the Crow Point Festival in September 2006 to celebrate its centenary. It is used for charity events such as sponsored abseils.

=== Refurbishment ===
The bridge was shut down in 1985 because of wear and tear. Following a £3 million refurbishment, it reopened in 1995. Service was suspended again in December 2008 with the bridge facing a £2 million repair bill. £1.225 million was spent on refurbishment, financed by grants from the Welsh Government, Newport City Council and Cadw. It re-opened on 30 July 2010. The bridge was closed on 16 February 2011, because of operational problems, but re-opened again on 4 June.

As of 2026, the bridge is for extensive repairs. In August 2026 a Council spokesman stated that the bridge would not open until 2027 following challenging renovations.

=== Appearances in popular media ===
The transporter bridge provided the setting for some scenes in the 1959 British crime drama film Tiger Bay, which was set in Cardiff and therefore gave audiences the impression that the bridge was in Cardiff and not Newport. The bridge features extensively in the 1996 video for the song "Talk to Me" by Newport band 60 Ft. Dolls.

== Visitor centre ==
The Visitor Centre is located on the west bank and features exhibits on the history of the bridge, its construction and other transporter bridges around the world. The centre has a painting of David Pearce, the former undefeated Welsh and British Heavyweight Boxing Champion 1983–1985. Pearce used to run up the steps of the Transporter Bridge during his training. The centre is generally open at weekends, but it is currently closed while extensive restoration of the bridge structure is performed and a new visitor centre is constructed.

== Gallery ==
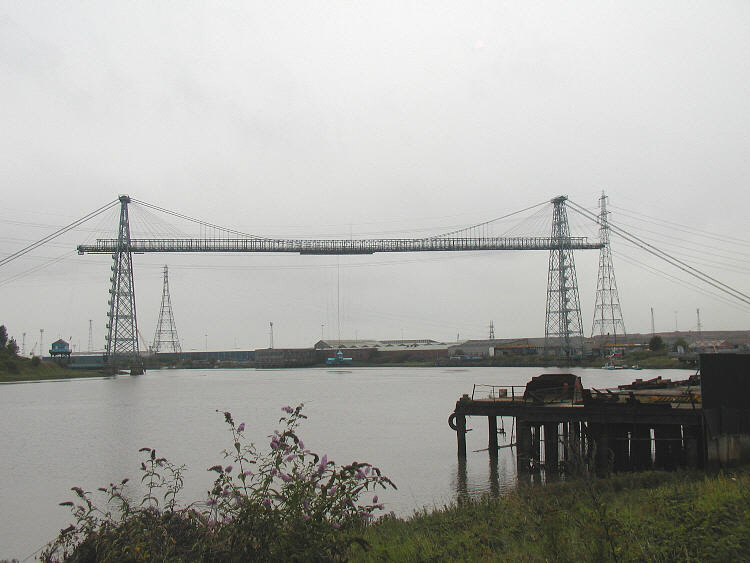
The bridge from the West bank to the North

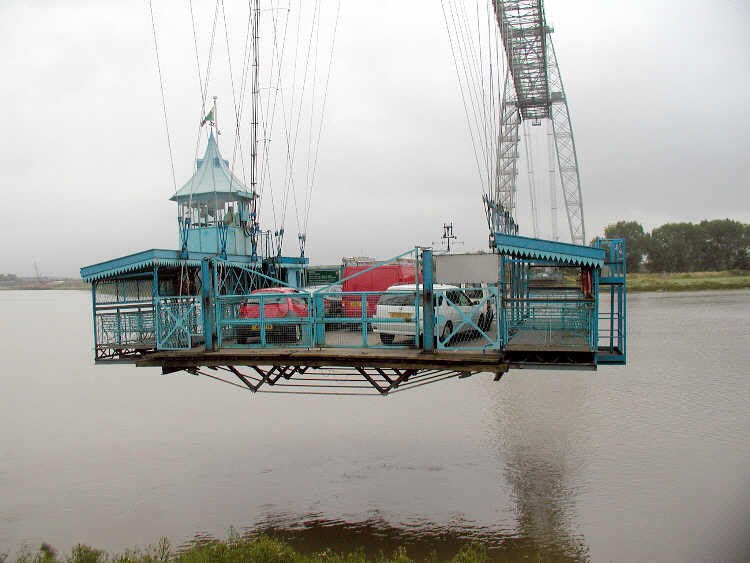
The gondola in transit

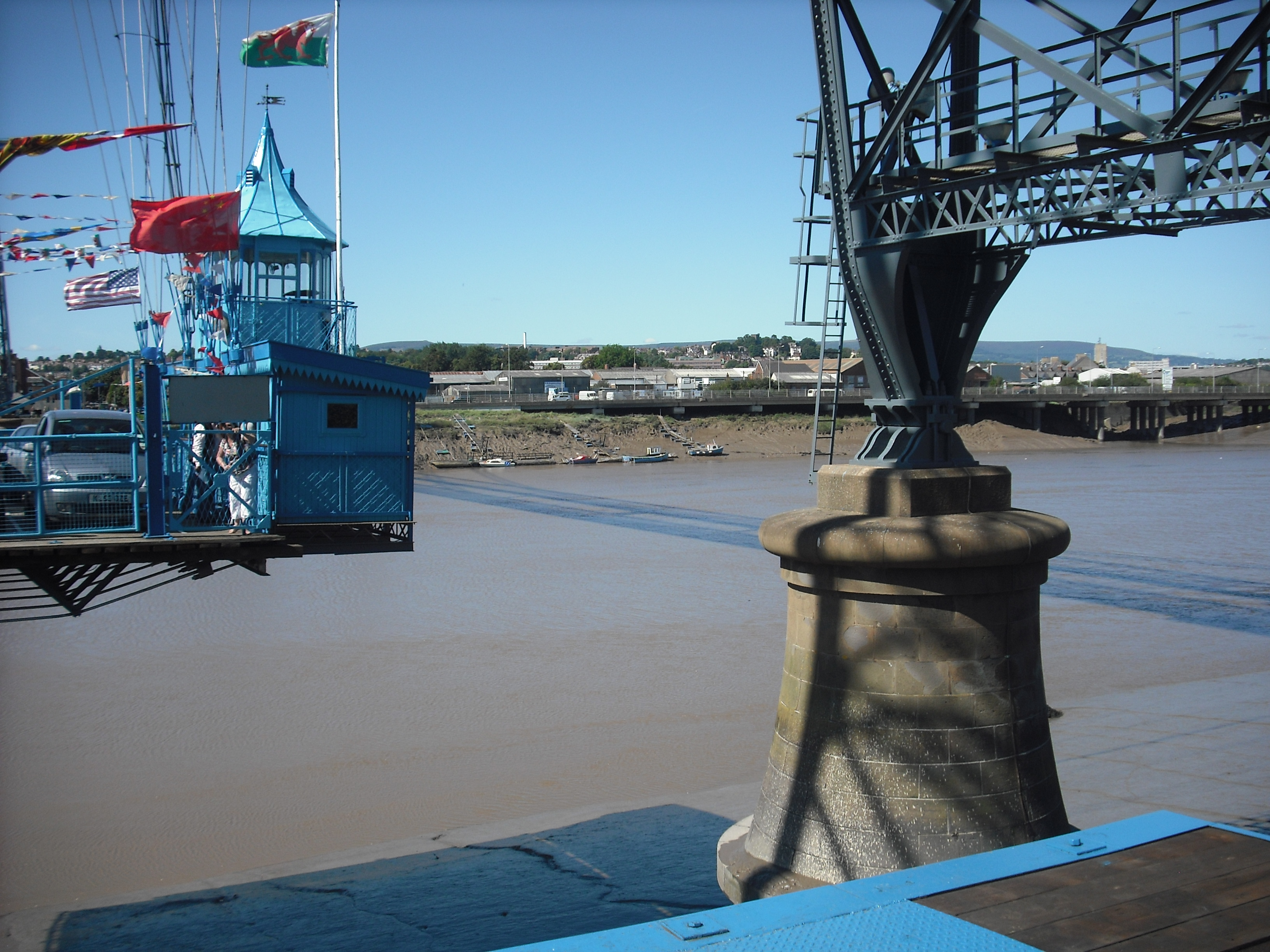
Gondola approaching the pier

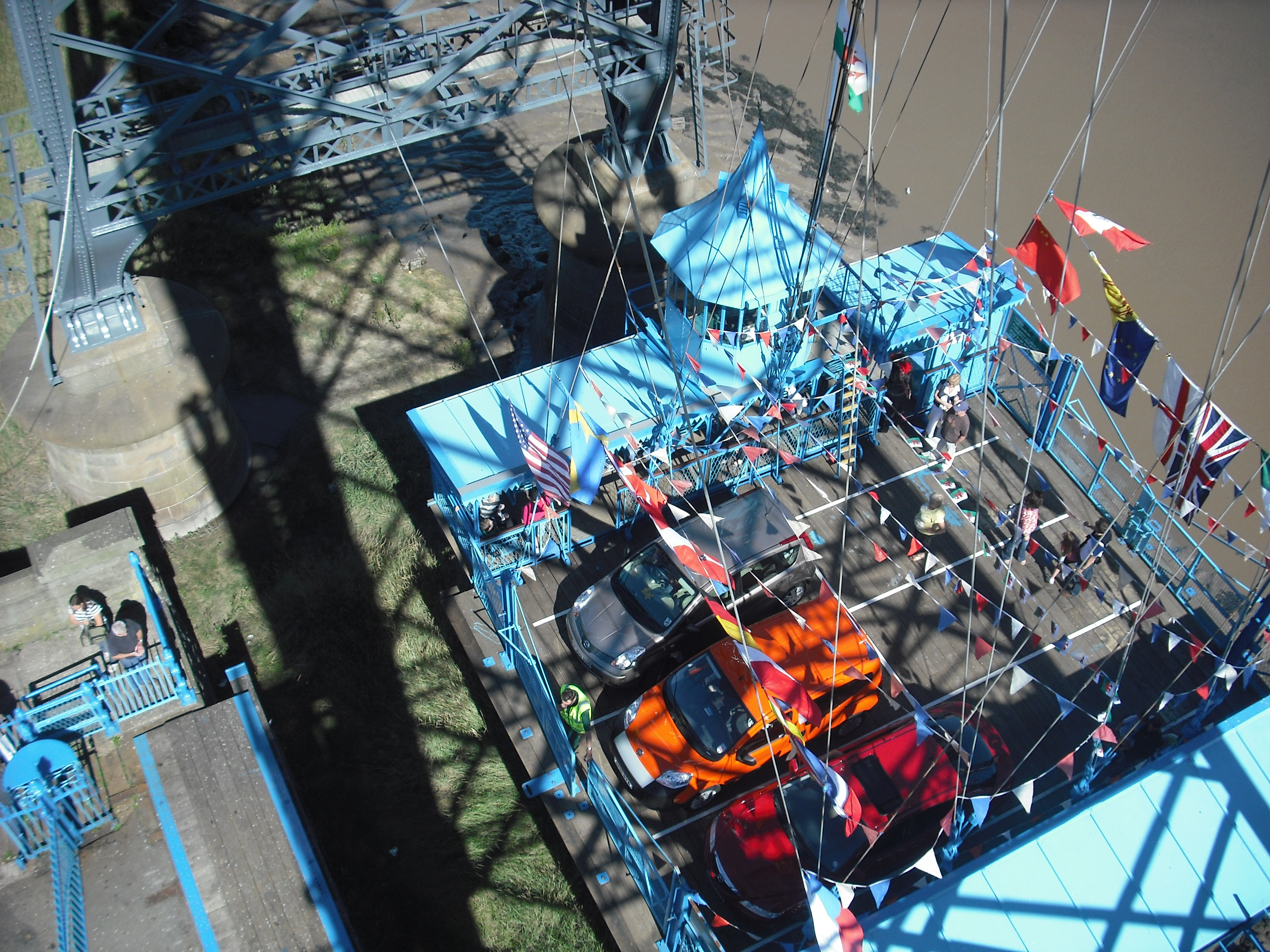
Looking down onto the gondola

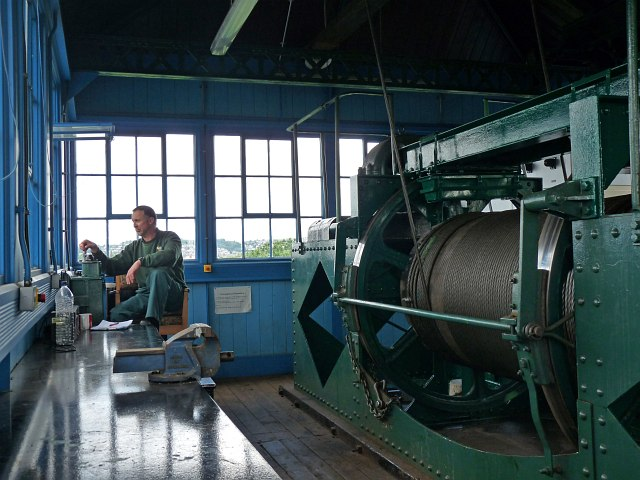
Operating the cables and motors

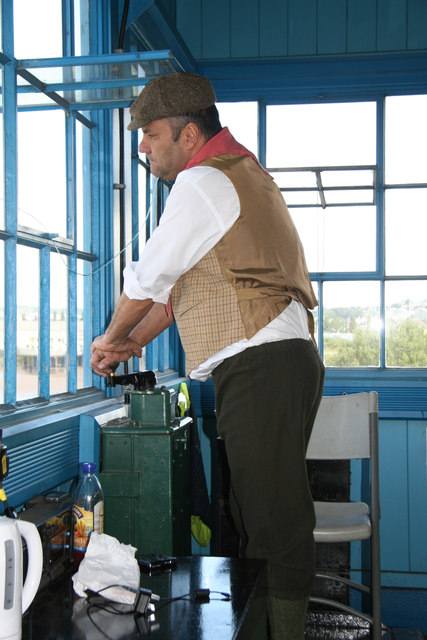
Operating the gondola

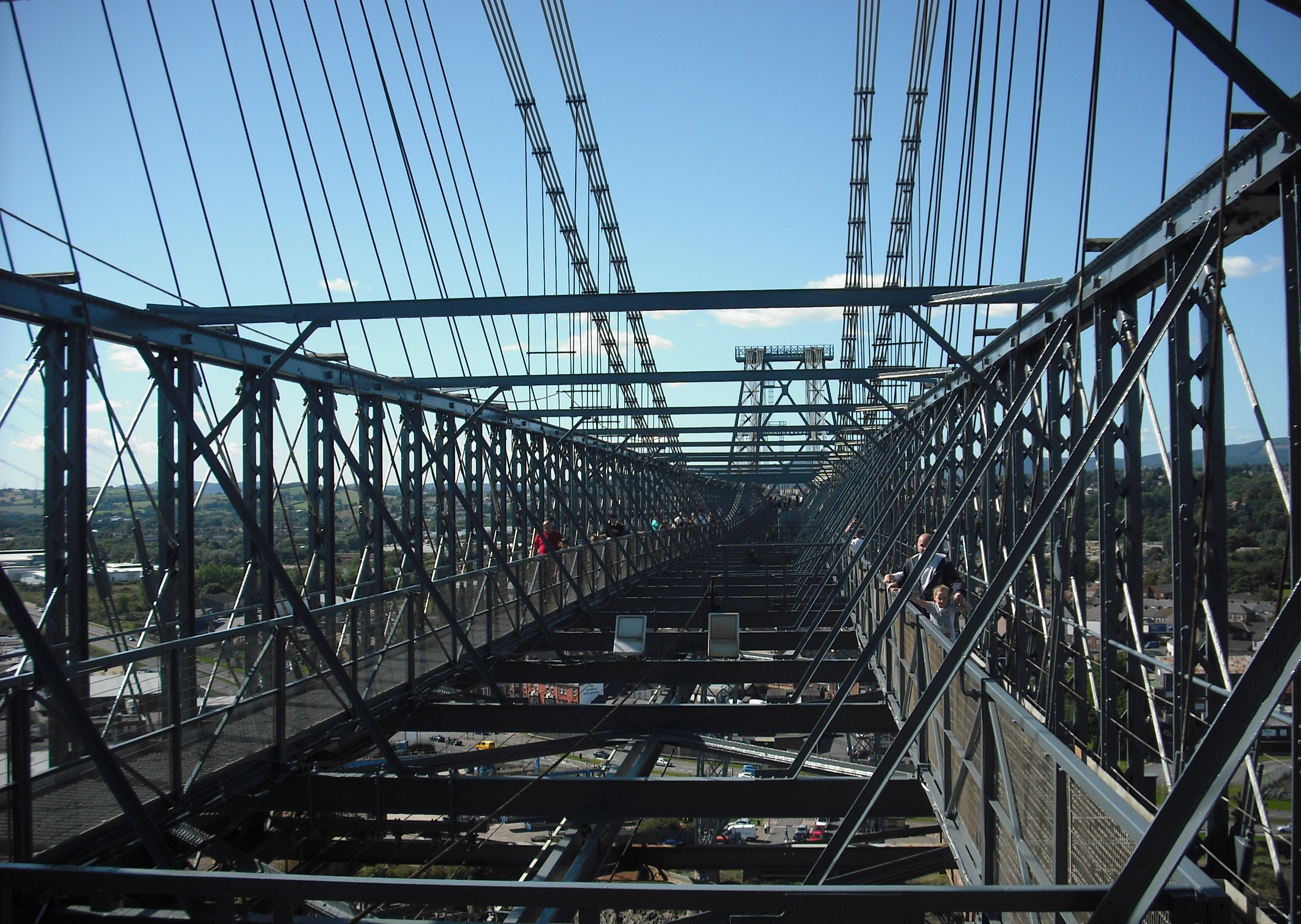
Main girder, from inside

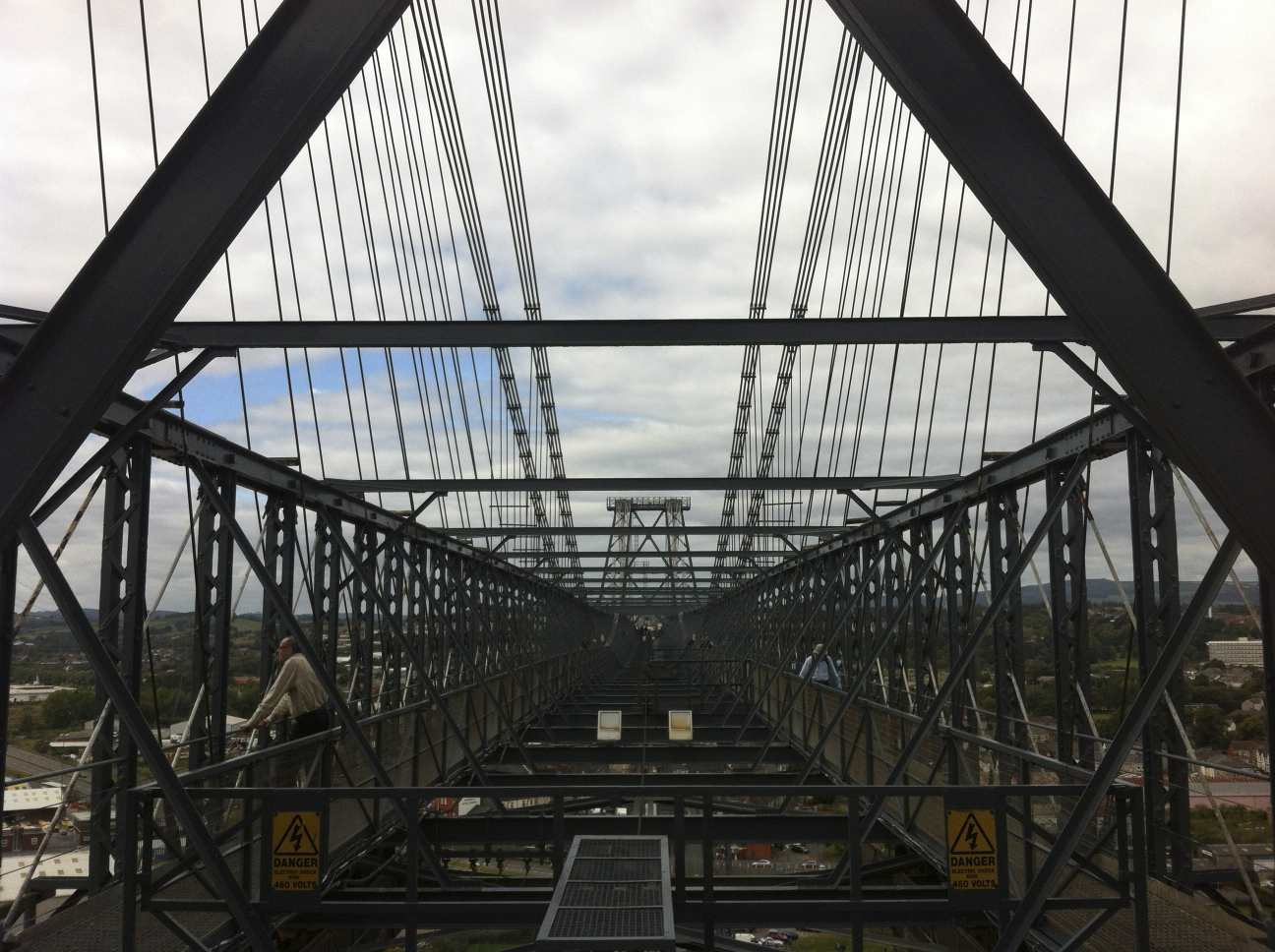
Walkway on top of the bridge showing the pulley cable

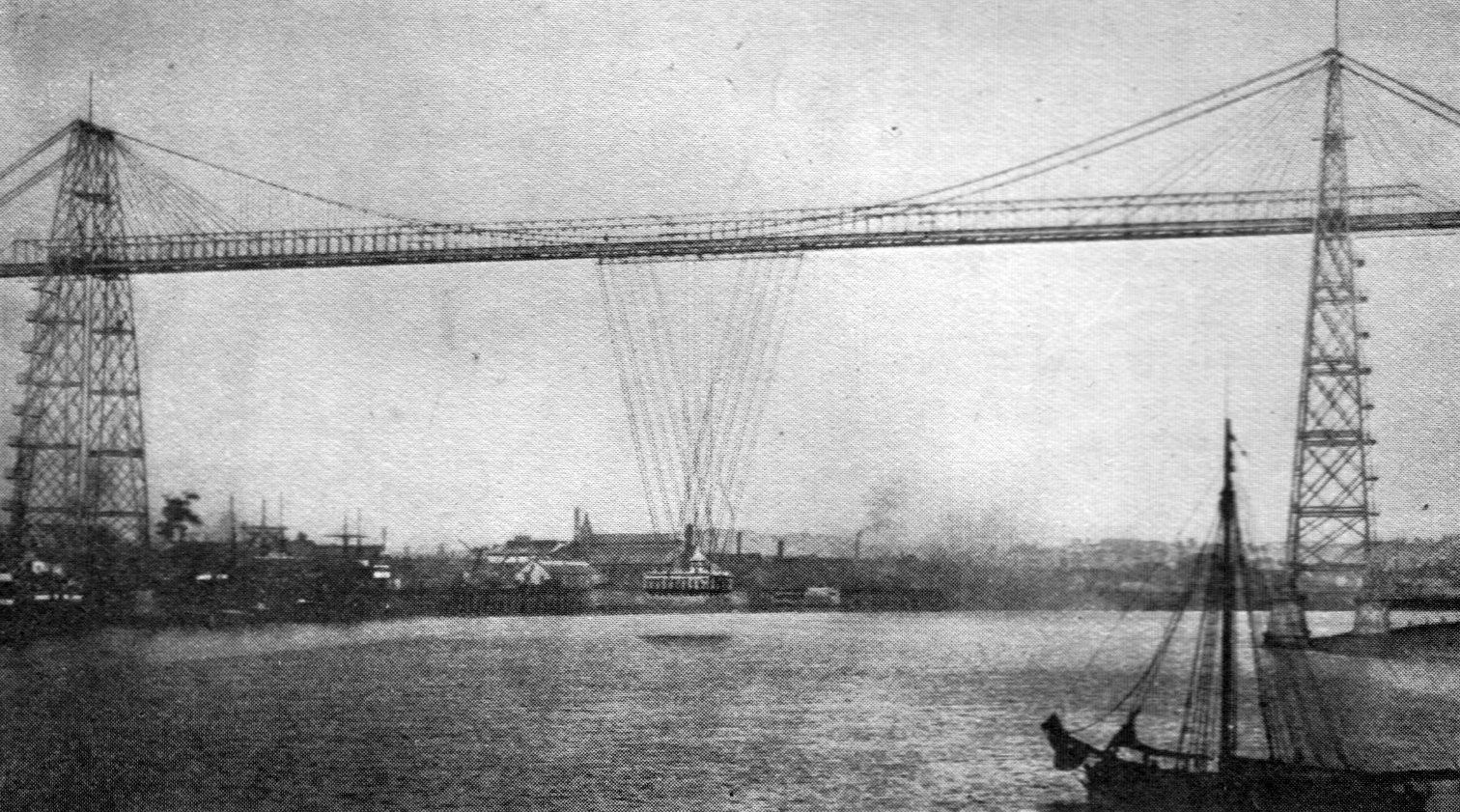
Newport Transporter Bridge, 1931

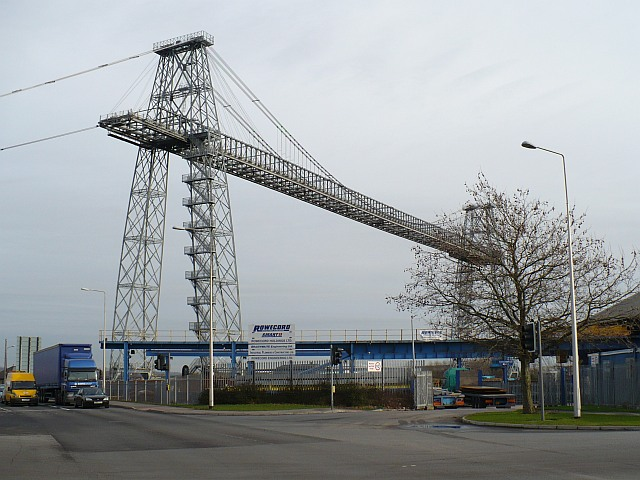
The Transporter Bridge in 2008

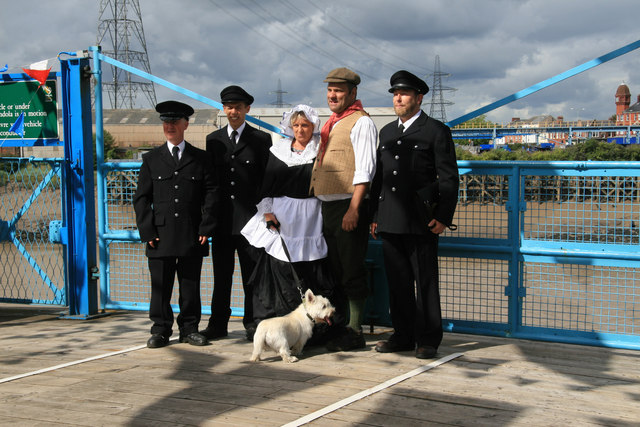
Official photograph of the bridge crew, 2013

== See also ==
- List of bridges in Wales
