= Rochefort-Martrou Transporter Bridge =

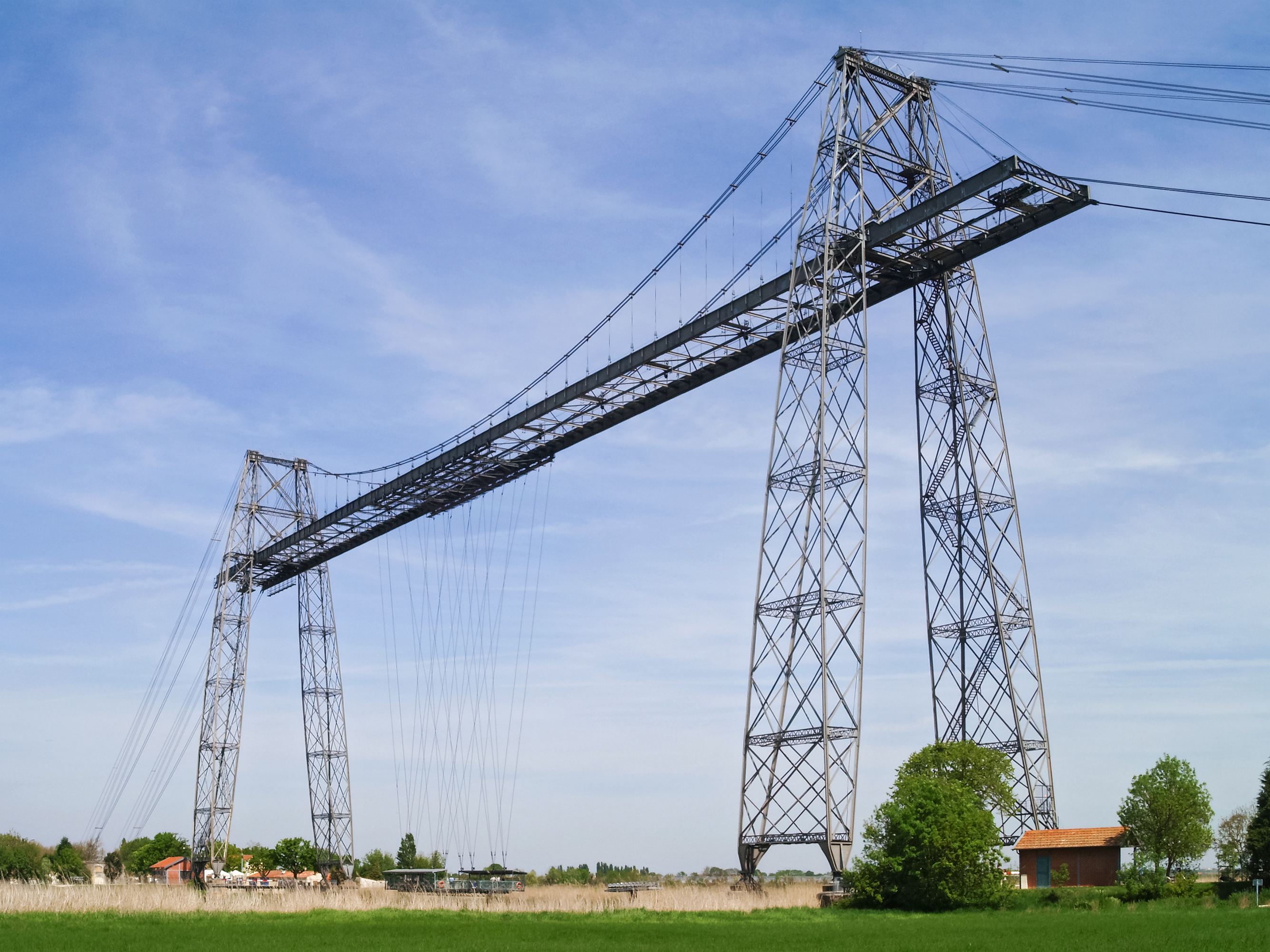
- Rochefort-Martrou Transporter Bridge seen from the south bank of the Charente river
- Coordinates: 45°54′58″N 0°57′38″W
- Crosses: Charente
- Locale: Rochefort, Charente-Maritime, Nouvelle-Aquitaine, France
- Official name: Rochefort-Martrou Transporter Bridge

Characteristics
- Total length: 175.5 metres (576 ft)
- Longest span: 139.95 metres (459.2 ft)
- Clearance below: 50 metres (160 ft)

History
- Opened: 8 July 1900

Location
- Interactive map of Rochefort-Martrou Transporter Bridge

Rochefort-Martrou Transporter Bridge is a transporter bridge built between 1898 and 1900. It is located in Rochefort, Charente-Maritime, Nouvelle-Aquitaine, France and connects the towns of Rochefort and Échillais without hindering the navigation of shipping serving the ports of Rochefort and Tonnay-Charente. It is the last transporter bridge in operation in France. Crossing the river Charente, it has a maximum height of 66.5 metres (218 ft) and a total length of 175.5 metres (576 ft). It is a technical invention accomplished by the French engineer Ferdinand Arnodin. It was abandoned in 1967 in favour of a vertical lift bridge, which was in turn demolished in 1991 a few months after the opening of a new dual-carriageway road bridge, the Martrou viaduct. However, the transporter bridge was refurbished by 1994 and is now a historical monument (1976). Crossing on foot or by bicycle or moped is still possible today from April to the end of October. Crossings last 75 seconds, excluding boarding and disembarking time.

== History ==
Work on the transporter bridge to replace a ferry that had become insufficient for traffic began in March 1898 and ended in July 1900, under the direction of Ferdinand Arnodin. The bridge was inaugurated on 29 July 1900 after 27 months of work. It cost 586,500 Francs and was planned to transport at each crossing, 9 horse-drawn carriages with 2 teams and 50 pedestrians or 200 pedestrians alone. Its capacity was 14 tons.

On 1 August 1912 Lucien Deneau flew his plane under the deck of the bridge.

Between 1933 and 1934 the beginnings of a fracture were detected in the stiffness beams of the lower chords. These beams forming part of the deck were replaced and modified and consolidation work was carried out by the company Fives-Lille-Cail. The maximum load of the nacelle then increased to 16 tons.

During the post-war period, new consolidation work was carried out. However, the waiting times were becoming longer due to the increase in traffic on the road which crosses it with sometimes a 500m queue on either side of the structure. As early as 1967, a new lifting deck bridge was built 100m downstream and in 1975 a budget of 1.4 million Francs was allocated in anticipation of the demolition of the transporter bridge. But on 30 April 1976, through its classification as a historical monument, it avoided destruction.

Between 1980 and 1994, the bridge was renovated with funding from the EEC. 7 million Francs was used for the overall renovation: replacement of metal parts of the framework, renovation of the platform of the nacelle, general control of all the metal framework and all the cables, painting etc. Then it was re-inaugurated and put back into service for tourist operations during the summer.

At the same time, the lifting bridge located downstream was replaced by the Martrou viaduct inaugurated in 1991. Built in pre-stressed concrete and having 2 × 2 lanes, it was originally planned for the increase in road traffic, at toll for vehicles outside the Charente-Maritime department up to 1st January 2004. The lift bridge was demolished a few months later; today only the bases of the 4 reinforced concrete piers remain.

At the beginning of 2016, the restoration of the transporter bridge was announced, with the replacement of the full-web deck dating from 1933 by a trellis deck as originally conceived. Crossings aboard the transporter bridge nacelle were interrupted for the duration of the work. The reopening to the public was announced for its 120th anniversary

== Cinema ==
From May to August 1966 the ferry served as the backdrop for the opening scene of Jacques Demy's film Les Demoiselles de Rochefort, where the fairground caravan may be seen crossing the Charente, and where the suspended gondola serves as a stage for a choreographic composition. Demy had considered having it painted in pink for his film, but the locals refused.

It also appears many times in the TV movie La boule noire (2014) by Denis Malleval, adapted from the novel by Georges Simenon.

== See also ==
- List of bridges in France
