= Île de Nantes =

Island in the Loire river in Nantes, France

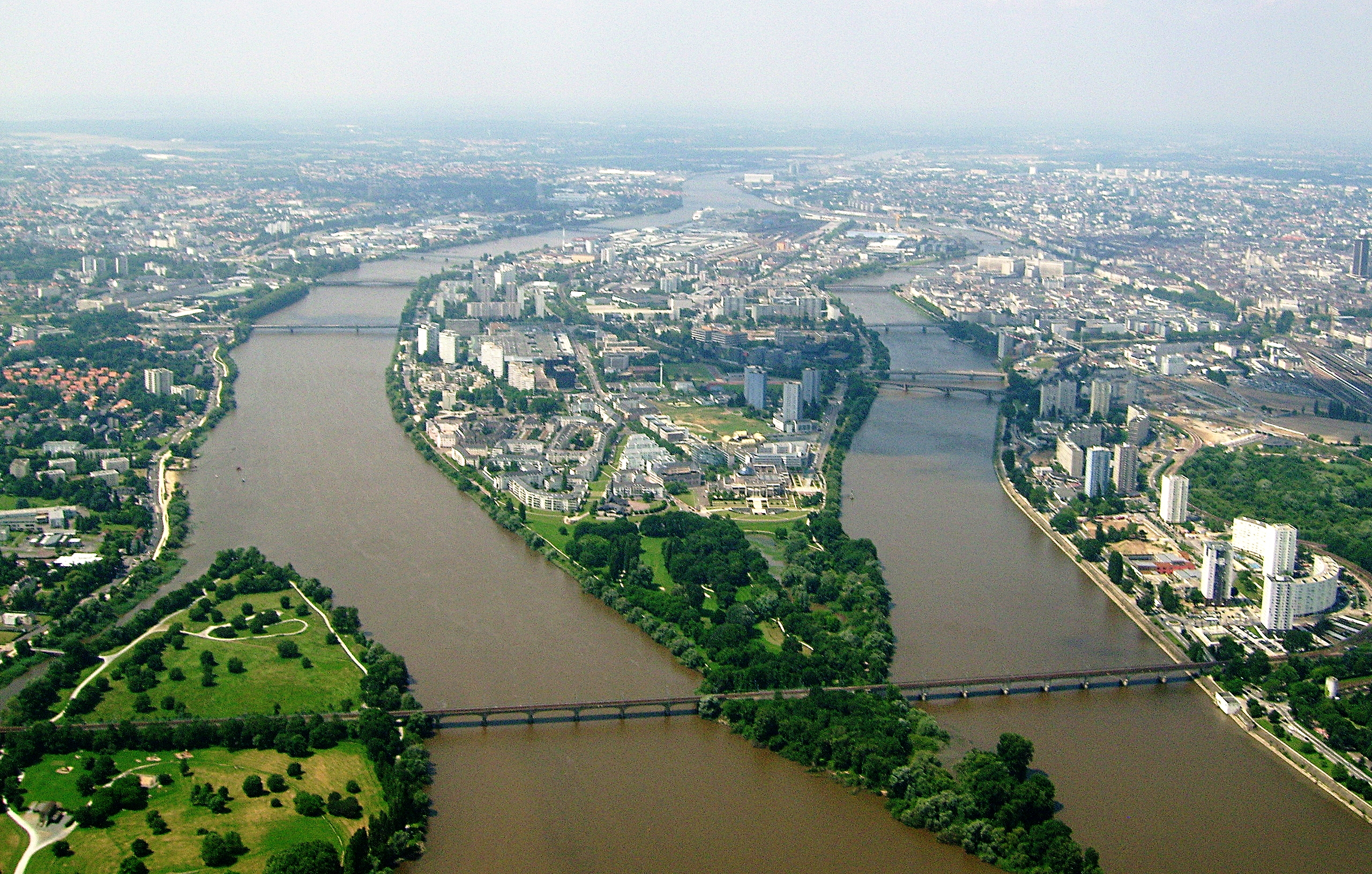
Aerial view of the île de Nantes

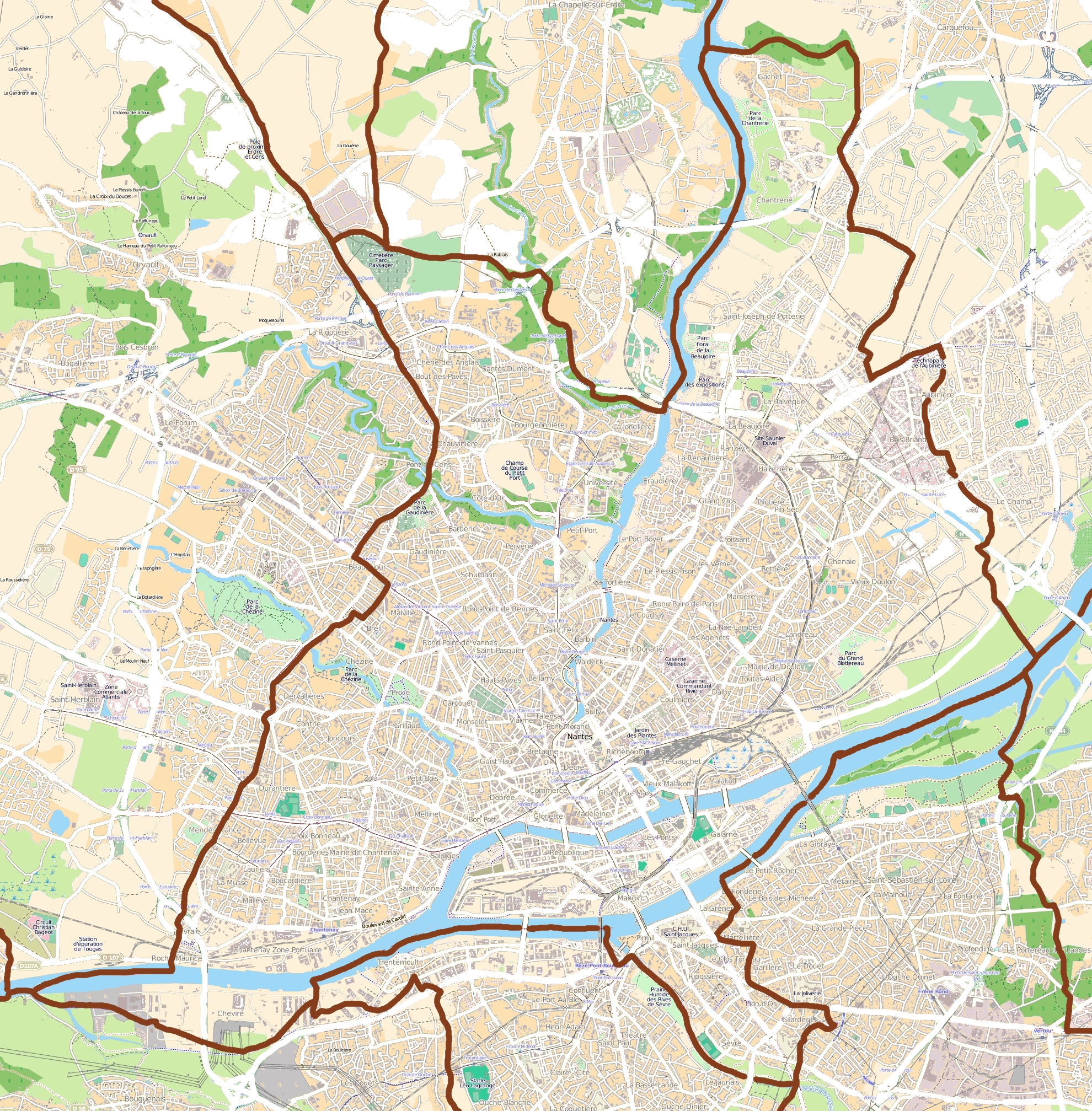
The île de Nantes on the map of Nantes

The île de Nantes (French pronunciation: [il də nɑ̃t], Island of Nantes; Breton: Enez Naoned) is an island located in the centre of the city of Nantes, France, surrounded by two branches of the river Loire: the "bras de la Madeleine" (branch of the Madeleine) to the north, and the "bras de Pirmil" (branch of Pirmil) to the south. It is one of the eleven neighbourhoods of Nantes.

== Dimensions and history ==
The island is 4.9 km (3.0 mi) long and 1 km (0.6 mi) wide due to joining together former small islands in the centre of Nantes, separated by the branches of the Loire river (sometimes referred to locally as the "Boires", as in "Boire des Récollets, "boire de Toussaint" and "boire de la Biesse"). The branches (intervening channels) were filled in during the 19th and 20th centuries. Chiefly these islands were the "île Beaulieu", "île Sainte-Anne", "île de Petite Biesse" and the "île de Grande Biesse" the more water meadow-like "prairie au Duc", "prairie d'Aval", "prairie d'Amont", "prairie de Balagué", "prairie de Pré-Joli". It is one of the most developed and well-conserved parts of the city while featuring modern buildings such as its major basketball and indoor sports venue. Many trees and flowers are on the island, which in part helped the city to be recognized as European Green Capital in 2013.

In March 2022, construction began on the CHU de Nantes − Hôpital Loire Santé, a hospital complex on the island, intended to replace the Hôtel-Dieu de Nantes hospital in the city centre. The 13-building complex will span 220,000 square metres (2,400,000 sq ft) in the future quartier de La Santé (Health district), which will include a health research institute, a health campus for medical students, and an innovation business campus. Being the largest hospital construction project in Europe, with a budget of 1.25 billion euros, it, according to Mayor Johanna Rolland, "positions Nantes at the head of the largest current European investments in the service of health". The new Nantes CHU will open in mid-2028.

== Access ==
The île de Nantes is linked to the rest of the city by 13 bridges:

- 8 bridges cross the branch of the Madeleine:
  - Éric Tabarly bridge
  - Résal bridge (railway bridge)
  - Willy Brandt's bridge
  - Aristide Briand bridge
  - Général Audibert bridge
  - Haudaudine bridge
  - Passerelle Victor-Schœlcher (pedestrian bridge)
  - Anne-de-Bretagne bridge
- 5 bridges cross the branch of Pirmil:
  - Léopold Sédar Senghor bridge
  - Georges Clemenceau bridge
  - Pirmil bridge
  - Pornic bridge (railway bridge with a bicycle track)
  - Trois continents bridge

The Vendée's bridge is a railway bridge, which crosses the island, but there is no railway station on the island.

== Locations of interest ==
- Les Anneaux de Buren (Buren's Rings)
- Blockhaus DY10
- Carrousel des mondes marins (Carousel of the Marine Worlds)
- Grues Titan de Nantes (Titan cranes of Nantes)
- Hangar à bananes (Bananas facility)
- Jardin des Fonderies (Garden of the Foundries)
- Machines of the Isle of Nantes
- Palais de justice de Nantes (Nantes Courthouse)
- Palais des Sports de Beaulieu
