= Ferdinand Arnodin =

French engineer/industrialist (1845–1924)

Ferdinand Joseph Arnodin (9 October 1845 – 24 April 1924) was a French engineer and industrialist born in Sainte-Foy-lès-Lyon, Rhône who died in Châteauneuf-sur-Loire in Loiret. Specialising in cableway transporters, he is regarded as the inventor of the transporter bridge, having been the first to patent the idea in 1887. However, the first such bridge was in fact designed by Alberto Palacio, with Arnodin's help.

Nine of the eighteen known examples of the transporter bridge may be attributed to him. Three of them still exist. They use the technology of both suspension bridges and cable-stayed bridges. Arnodin built a great number of second generation suspension bridges at the turn of the 20th century, and he also restored and consolidated a number of old first generation suspension bridges (before 1860): the aprons were reinforced and the old wire cables replaced by spirally-wound double torsion steel wire ropes, often with addition of a cable-stayed bridge (known structural modification under the name of “Système Arnodin”). His factory (for the production of prefabricated metal sub-structures) was established in Châteauneuf-sur-Loire. Vestiges of this factory were still visible a few years ago, and the chimney could still be seen, half ruined, between the Loire and railway.

The Loire Fleet Museum, at Châteauneuf-sur-Loire, shows memories of these workshops: an old model of the Nantes transporter bridge, a section of steel wire rope manufactured by Arnodin and photographs.

Ferdinand Arnodin graduates from the Conservatoire national des arts et métiers.

== Major works ==
- Bilbao Puente Colgante, 1893, still in use
- Bizerta/Brest Transporter Bridge, 1898
- Rouen Transporter Bridge, 1898
- Rochefort-Martrou Transporter Bridge, 1900, still in use
- Nantes Transporter Bridge, 1903
- Marseille Transporter Bridge, 1905, destroyed 1944
- Newport Transporter Bridge, 1906, still in use
- Bordeaux Transporter Bridge, never finished
- Sidi M'Cid Bridge, Constantine, Algeria, 1908, 160 m span
- Pont du Bonhomme, 1904.

== Related Articles ==
- Southwest Line
