= Fishing port of Lorient-Keroman =

Fishing port in Lorient, France

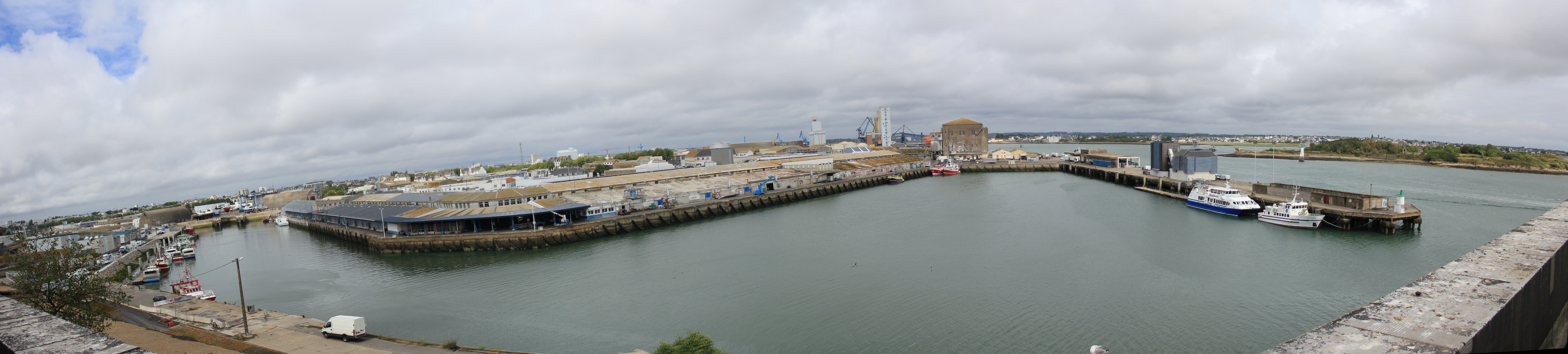
- View of the Keroman fishing port.
- Interactive map of Fishing port of Lorient-Keroman

Location
- Country: France
- Location: Lorient
- Coordinates: 47°43′48″N 3°21′54″W

Details
- Size: 55 hectares
- Draft depth: 8 meters

The Fishing port of Lorient-Keroman (Breton: Porzh-pesketa an Oriant-Keroman) is a French fishing port in Lorient, a district of the same name. It is owned by the Brittany region and managed by a public-private partnership in which Lorient Agglomération is the majority shareholder. Since 2014, it has been the foremost French fishing port in terms of value and the second most productive French fishing port in terms of catch volume. (Note: The first being Boulogne-sur-Mer.)

Construction of the port began in the 1920s under the 200 million franc law, which sought to enhance the capabilities of the French fishing fleet. Its development was temporarily halted by the advent of the Second World War and the construction of the Lorient Submarine Base nearby. Following the conclusion of hostilities, the facility resumed its growth trajectory, yet it was subjected to a series of recurring crises from the late 1970s to the late 1990s.

The port's primary activities include fishing and seafood processing. The port's fleet operates along the coastal waters of Lorient and extends to the northern seas of Scotland. Additionally, shipbuilding and repair are conducted on-site, along with various service activities. On occasion, the site is also used for cultural activities, such as the "Night of the Fishing Port" event held during the Lorient Interceltic Festival.

== History ==
=== Fishing in Lorient before Keroman ===
The port activities of Lorient underwent a period of considerable expansion during the latter half of the nineteenth century, driven by the city's shipyards, which were regarded as the most advanced in France at the time. (Note: The first French screw frigate, La Pomone, was launched from Lorient yards in 1848. This was followed by the Couronne, the first French armored frigate, launched from Lorient yards in 1861.) This resulted in an increase in coal imports by ship from Wales, which was used to power the city's facilities, and the gradual construction of new quays to accommodate a growing fleet. Concurrently, the city was connected to the railway network in 1862, which provided it with a competitive advantage over neighboring ports such as Étel, Port-Louis, Gâvres, and Larmor.

The fishing sector in the city underwent a similar process of structured organization around the same time. In 1856, fishermen from the Lorient harbor successfully petitioned the city government to establish a "fish sales agency", which was initially housed in the city's central halls and modeled after similar agencies in other French fishing ports, such as Bordeaux and La Rochelle. In 1888, a fish market was constructed on the counter quay of the commercial port, and it was connected to the railway in 1906.

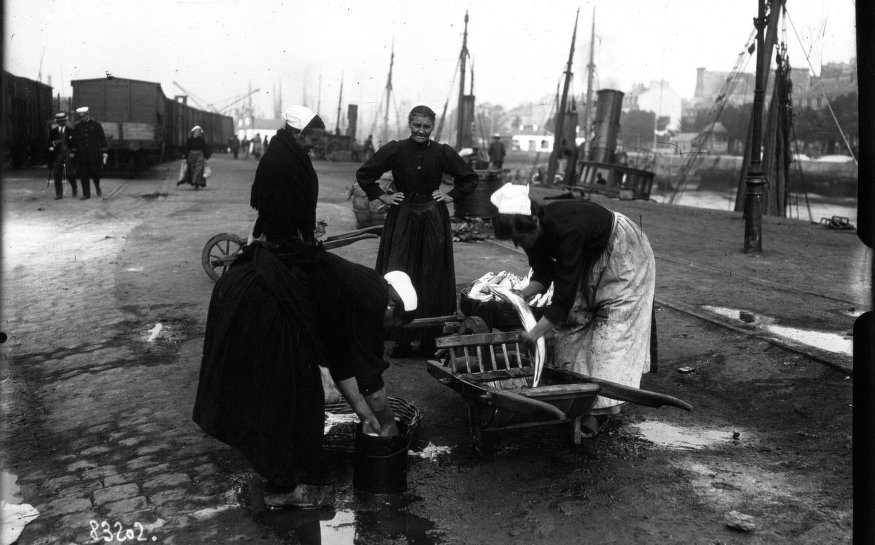
Fish merchants in Lorient in the late 1910s.

As fishing practices evolved, the widespread adoption of canning facilitated the development of sardine fishing along the Breton coast, which began in 1824. The proliferation of canning factories, coupled with overfishing, precipitated a series of crises in this activity, including those that occurred between 1880 and 1887 and between 1902 and 1908. The salt herring fishermen of the Île de Groix began selling their catches at more lucrative markets on the southern Atlantic coast of France, thereby introducing techniques previously used for albacore tuna fishing. This fishing practice necessitated venturing further from the coastline, thereby requiring the use of more powerful and sturdier vessels. The first steam trawler appeared in 1900 (the L'Éclaireur, followed the next year by the Lorientais), and by 1909, Lorient's traffic equaled that of the three ports of Douarnenez, Pont-l'Abbé, and Concarneau combined. By 1914, Lorient had 16 steam trawlers, several of which were purchased secondhand from Great Britain and even Germany.

Development came to a halt with the outbreak of the First World War, when trawlers were requisitioned by the military, allowing fish stocks to replenish. The growing fleet of steam trawlers necessitated the creation of industrial and commercial jobs, thereby making the geographical consolidation of these activities a necessity.

=== Origins and construction ===
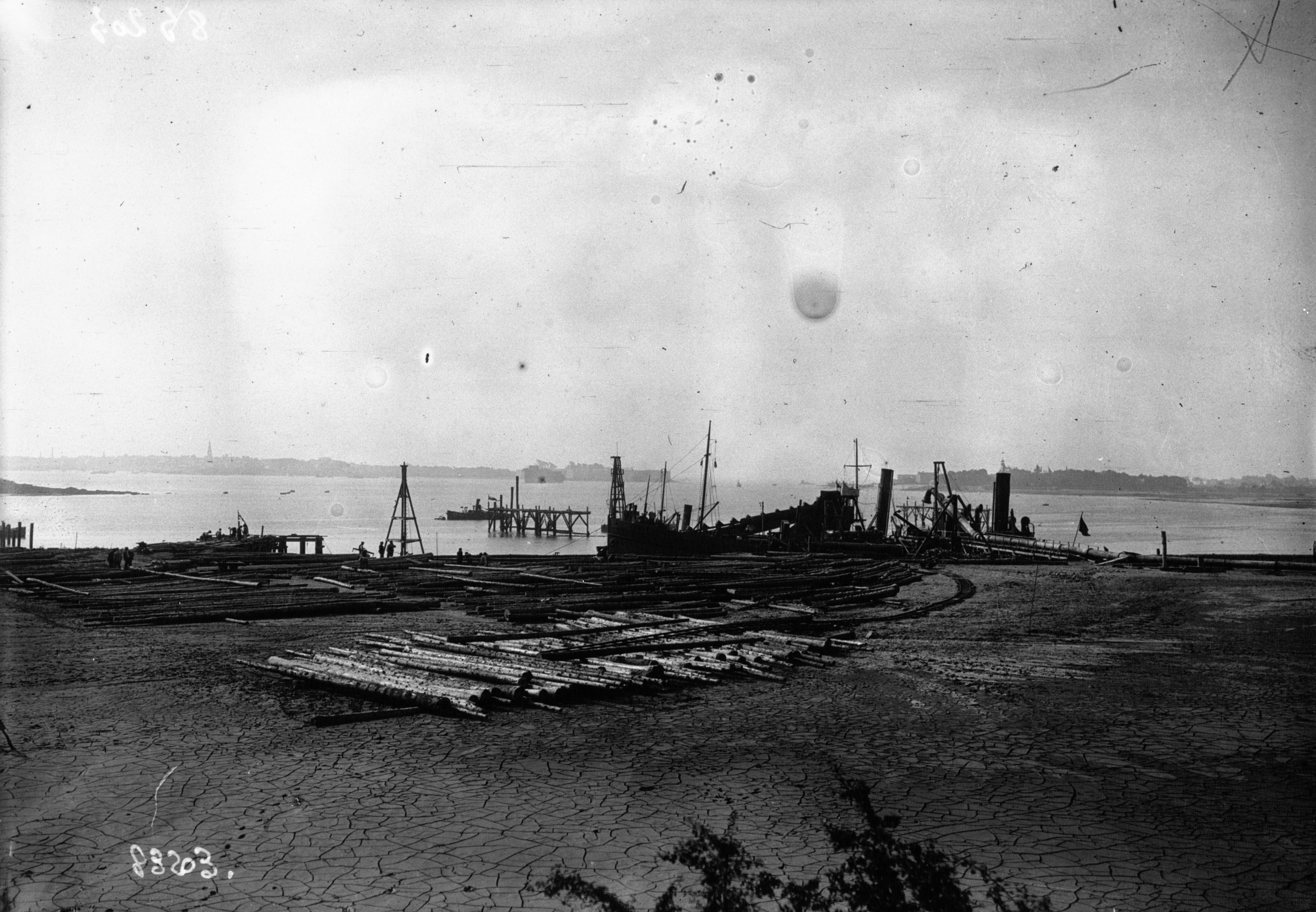
Port under construction.

Towards the end of the 1910s, Louis Nail, a deputy from the Morbihan region and former mayor of Lorient, conceived the idea of establishing a modern fishing port in the city, situated on the La Perrière point. In 1918, he initiated contact with engineer Henry Verrière to discuss this proposal. The growing number of trawlers was occupying an increasing amount of space, which was disrupting the activities of the commercial and military ports. In 1926, for example, 56 trawlers were anchored in a silted-up foreport, which hindered access to these two ports.

Verrière's project proposed the development of the Keroman cove with 1,530 meters (5,020 ft) of quays, a 7.90-hectare (19.5-acre) water plan, several buildings, and a coal pier.

The French government, led by Fernand Bouisson, then High Commissioner of the Merchant Navy, undertook a study to develop the national fishing fleet. A preliminary bill was introduced in November 1918, authorizing an initial credit line of 40 million francs at the beginning of 1919. The so-called 200 million law was ultimately enacted and promulgated on 19 June 1920. Of this sum, Henry Verrière was awarded over 30 million francs in state funding, with the work beginning in 1919 and concluding in 1927.

The Keroman point, situated at the mouth of the Ter, was selected for the construction of the fishing port due to the efforts of Louis Nail and his successor, Alphonse Rio. This location is situated two kilometers (1.2 mi) to the south of the previous commercial port and three kilometers (1.9 mi) from the station. The project commenced in 1920 with the filling of La Perrière beach and the demolition of the old casino.

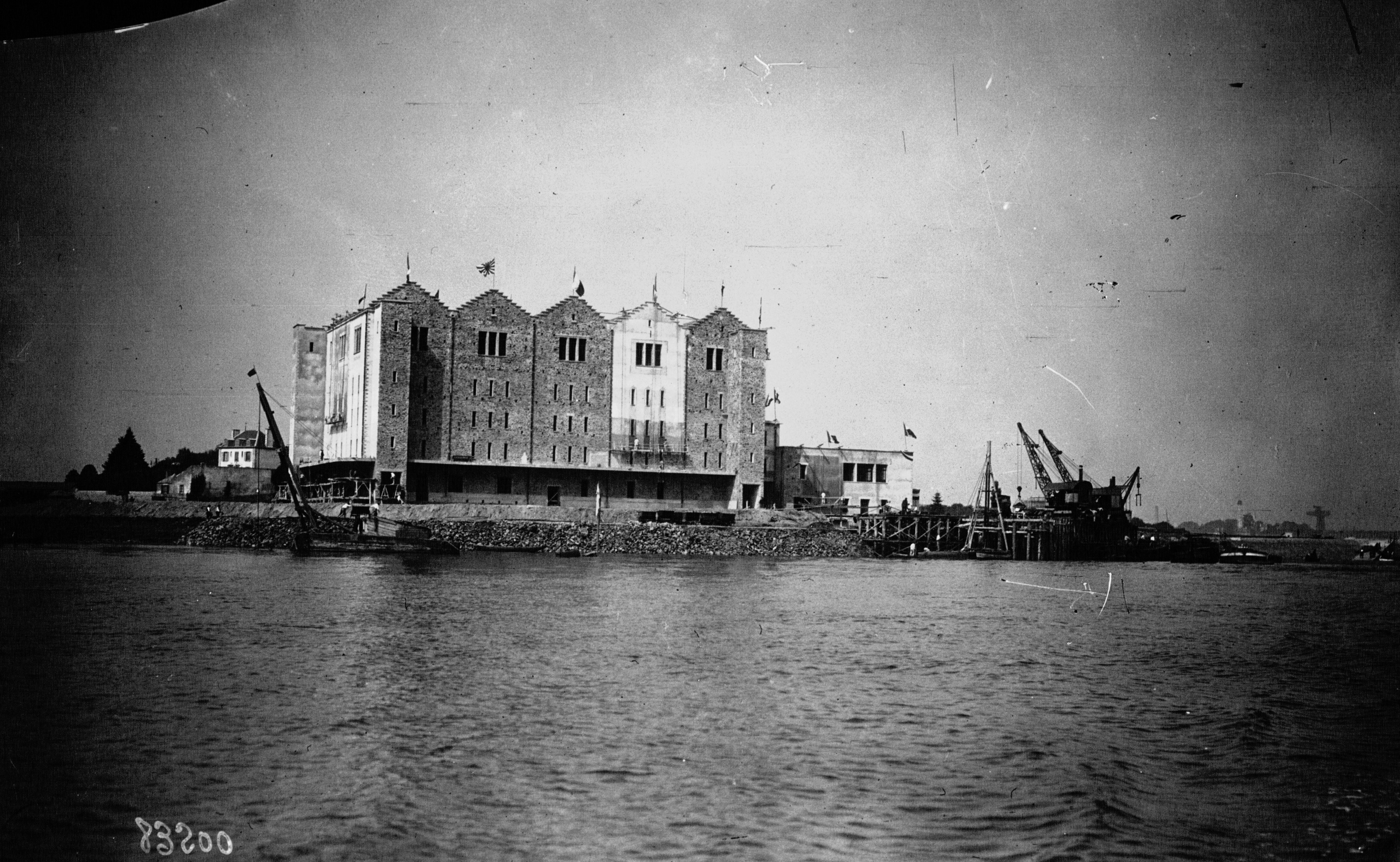
The refrigeration plant under construction in 1920.

Concurrently, a refrigeration plant project was initiated to enable trawlers to prolong the preservation of their fresh catches and expand the scope of their marketing activities. In 1919, construction commenced on the plant at an estimated cost of 8.6 million francs, with an inaugural ceremony scheduled for 1922.

The official inauguration occurred on 17 July 1927, and the concession was awarded to the Lorient fishing port company for 60 years. Construction of a star slipway commenced in 1928 and was completed in 1932, at which point it became operational.

The recently constructed port, which included a tidal basin, (Note: A tidal basin allows boats to dock without having to pass through a lock.) provided 1,800 meters (5,900 ft) of quays, a fish market, a coal pier, an ice plant, a rail connection that enabled the departure of tide trains equipped with isothermal wagons, and a slipway for the maintenance and repair of boats.

=== Development until the Second World War ===
Implementing these works resulted in a 50% increase in the volume of fish caught from 1926 to 1939, particularly from 1928 to 1931. During this period, the volume of fish caught rose from 15,800 tons to 23,000 tons. However, the activities were also subject to some crises during this period. The practice of overfishing led to a reduction in the efficiency of fishing boats, forcing them to venture further afield in search of fish. For example, the yield per trip for hake was reduced by approximately one-third between 1900 and 1930. Consumption failed to keep pace with production, resulting in a decline in prices. For instance, the price per kilogram of hake dropped from 3.03 francs in 1930 to 2.14 francs in 1935. Concurrently, operating costs increased, largely due to the 1926 coal crisis in England and currency devaluations. Canneries also faced challenges in selling their production, compounding the situation.

The crisis was overcome in several ways. The fleet gradually equipped itself with petrol engines, which were more economical than coal ones. From 1930 to 1939, the proportion of the tonnage of the Lorient fleet equipped with petrol engines increased from 3% to 29%. Legislative and regulatory measures also helped fishermen.

In 1938, the port of Keroman was home to 226 ships, including 182 trawlers.

=== Second World War ===
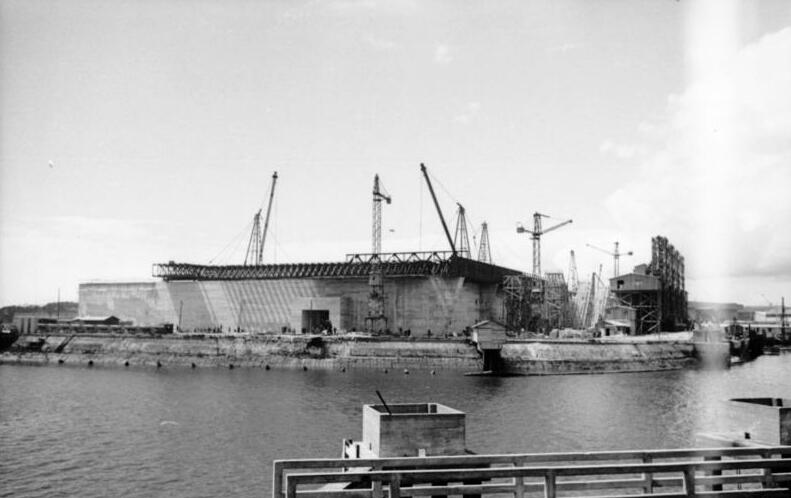
The Lorient Submarine Base built during the Second World War condemned the port's development plans.

The Keroman fishing port was affected by the war in various ways. Trawlers were requisitioned from August 1940, and several other ships took refuge in less exposed ports like Auray or La Trinité-sur-Mer. From 1943, the port's activities were completely halted. The total tonnage of Lorient's trawlers lost during the war was 47%.

Additionally, the Lorient Submarine Base, constructed by the German occupiers close to the port, rendered the area a primary target for Allied bombings. The first bombs to strike the port were on 14 and 27 September 1940. A series of further air raids on 18 and 22 November 1942, caused significant damage. The city was almost destroyed between 15 January and 23 February 1943.

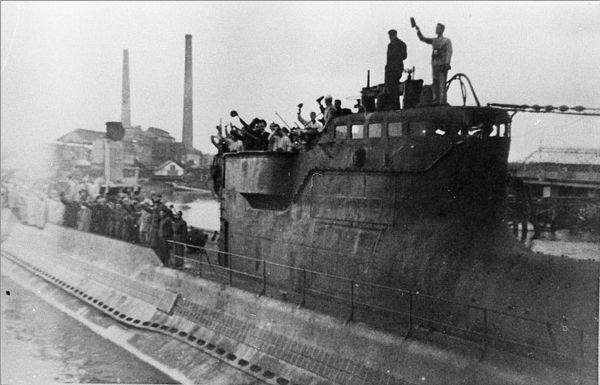
The Japanese submarine I-29 entering Lorient during a Yangai mission, 16 April 1944

The port's morphology underwent a significant transformation. The lands designated for the submarine base were initially earmarked for the port's expansion, derailing Verrière's plans. The occupying forces repurposed the slipway to accommodate larger vessels, and two Dom-Bunkers were constructed within its confines.

The late surrender of the Lorient pocket resulted in a delay to the port's reopening. On 14 August 1945, the ordinance on the reorganization of maritime fishing was promulgated. By the end of the same year, while the first pinasses commenced landing fish at Keroman, the larger trawlers remained in Concarneau, and the first 34 war damage claims were filed.

=== Post-War ===
The port area (in red), which includes the fishing port, and the roadstead.

Following the construction of the submarine base, the port's concession was reduced by twenty hectares (49 acres). The reconstruction work commenced on 16 June 1946, and most of the restoration was completed by mid-1951. The fleet was rebuilt establishing a reconstruction office, managed by shipowners who ordered new trawlers in series using war damage compensation, with possible additional payments. Between 1945 and 1953, 464 financing applications were submitted in this context in the Lorient maritime district. In 1973, the port's concession was purchased by the state and subsequently transferred to the Morbihan Chamber of Commerce and Industry.

During this period, infrastructure development proceeded apace. In 1952, 130 meters (430 ft) of fish auction space was added to the long basin. This was followed by an additional 50 meters (160 ft) meters in 1957, 75 meters (246 ft) in 1959, and 75 meters in 1962. The slipway underwent several modifications, including the addition of a fourth garage in 1958 and two more in 1962. Additionally, the equipment was modernized with the introduction of a landing conveyor in 1956, an aluminum bin unloading beam in 1959, an aerial ice conveyor with two unloading stations in 1960, and an unloading gantry in 1972.

Additional factors contributed to the port's growth. The fishing fleet of Étel and artisans from other ports in the harbor relocated to Keroman. The transportation of fishery products by truck became more prevalent, supplanting rail: from 1947 to 1972, the proportion of road transportation increased from 12% to 78%.

However, the port experienced a series of concurrent crises. The occurrence of shipwrecks in the fishing zones of Lorient, including the Torrey Canyon incident of 1967, the Olympic Bravery and the Boehlen in 1976, the Amoco Cadiz in 1978, and finally the Tanio in 1980, had a detrimental impact on the local fisheries. The subsequent increase in fuel prices following the 1973 oil shock and the ensuing economic depression harmed the port, coinciding with its efforts to modernize its fleet.

=== Recent developments ===
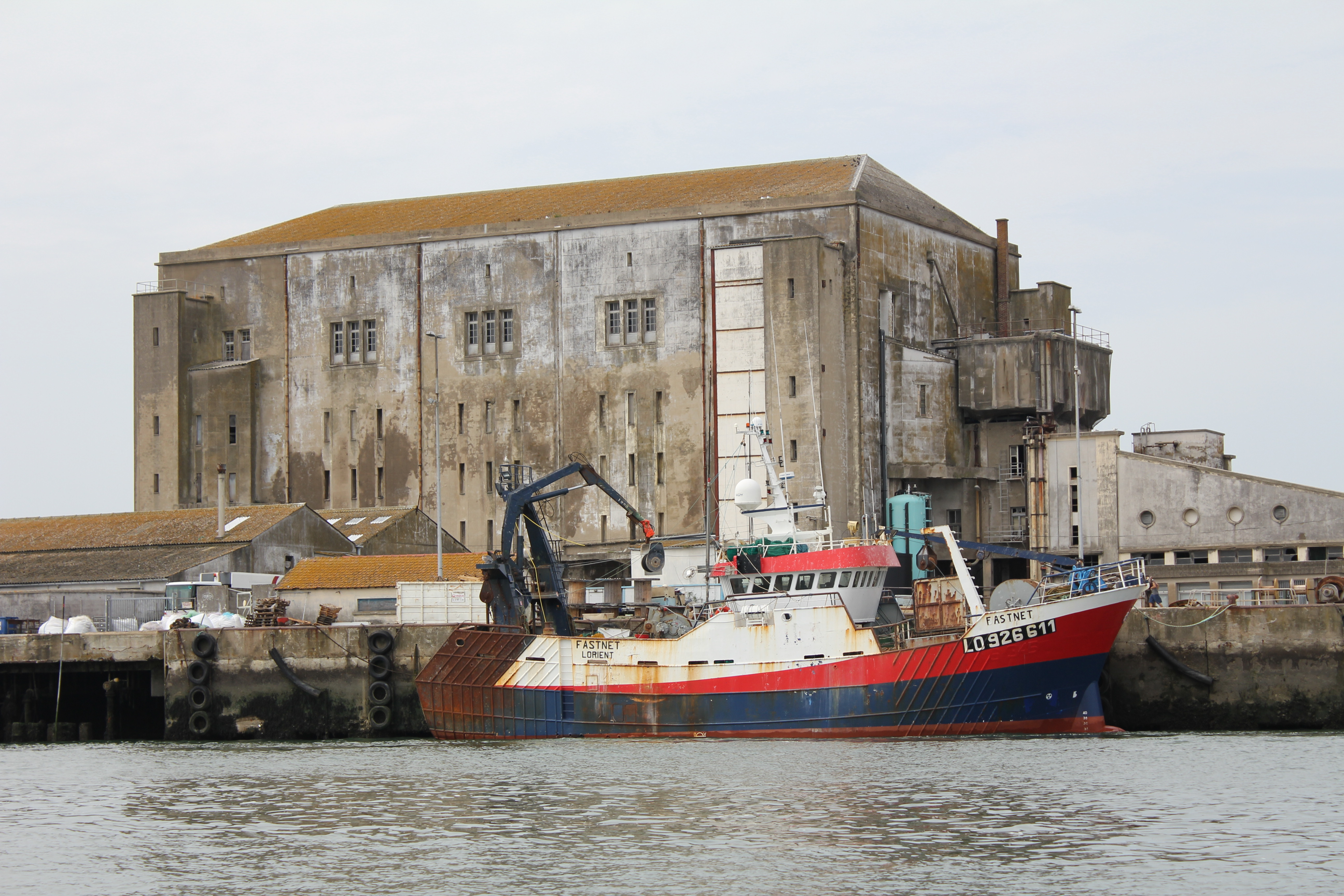
The former refrigeration plant, scheduled for demolition.

The fishing framework underwent a series of developments as a result of the incremental implementation of various European policies. In 1977, the exclusive fishing zone was expanded to encompass 200 miles (320 km). The Common Fisheries Policy was introduced in 1983, accompanied by the initial quota regulation. In 1987, the Lorient district was designated by the European Economic Community as a sensitive area and received financial assistance for vessels exceeding 33 meters (108 ft) in length.

The Morbihan Chamber of Commerce and Industry undertook modernization investments, with expenditures amounting to 184 million francs between 1973 and 1986 and an additional 125 million francs between 1988 and 1990. These investments proved inadequate to surmount a crisis precipitated by overfishing, and in 1994, a public-private partnership assumed control of the port's administration. Subsequent investment waves were initiated, with 20 million euros allocated for the period spanning 2006 to 2013.

In the early 2010s, an urban redevelopment project emerged in the vicinity of the fishing port, including the demolition of the ice factory constructed at the outset of the port's history, which was completed in March 2022.

== Infrastructure ==
=== Management ===
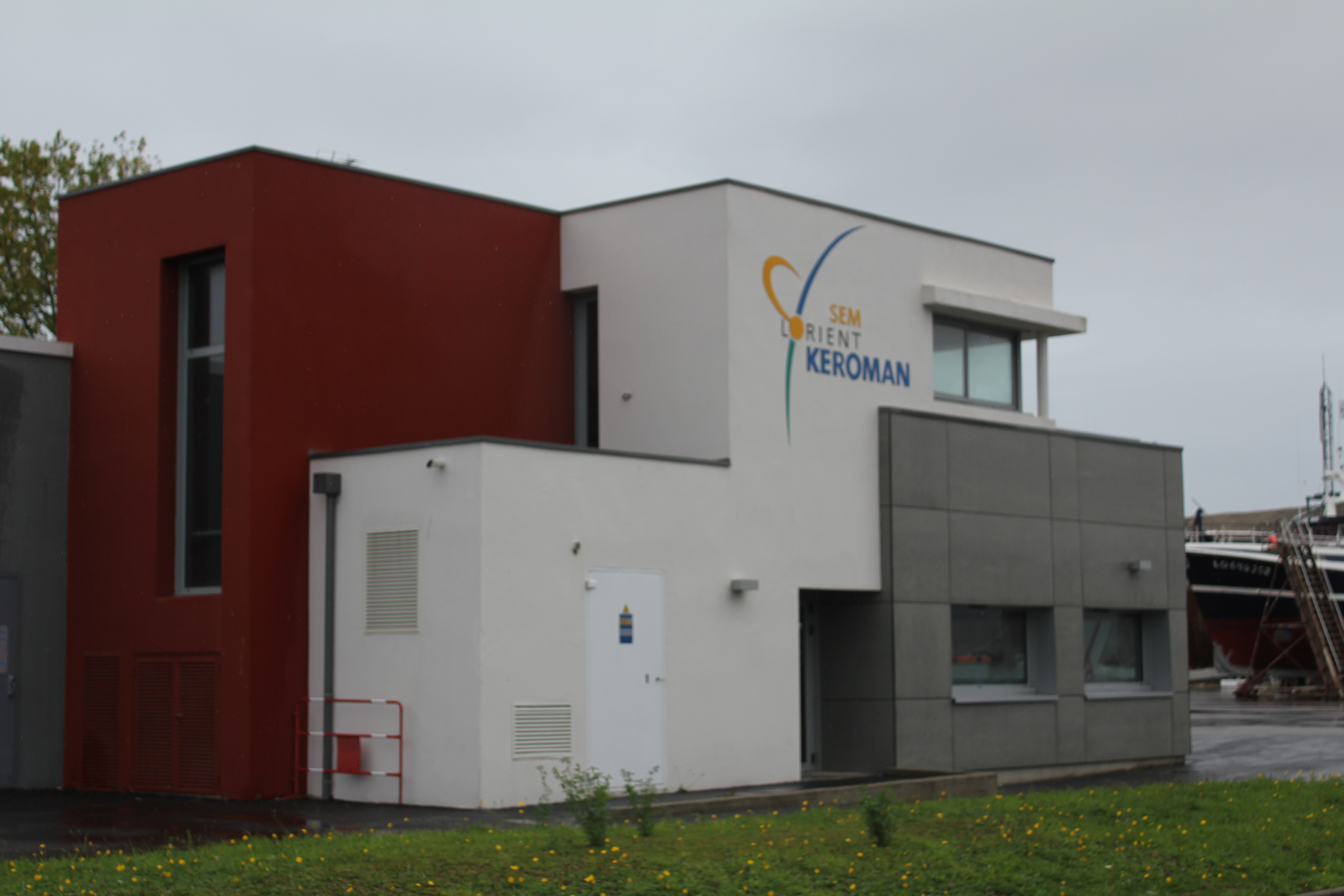
Premises for the Lorient-Keroman semi-public company.

Since 2007, the port has been under the ownership of the Brittany region, which assumed control from the state. The port occupies an area of 55 hectares (140 acres).

The concession is held by the Lorient-Keroman public-private partnership, with Lorient Agglomeration as the majority shareholder. This company succeeded the Morbihan Chamber of Commerce and Industry, which transferred this activity to it in 1994. The port's management is subcontracted to the Port Operating Company, a 100% subsidiary of Veolia.

=== Installations ===
==== Quays and basins ====
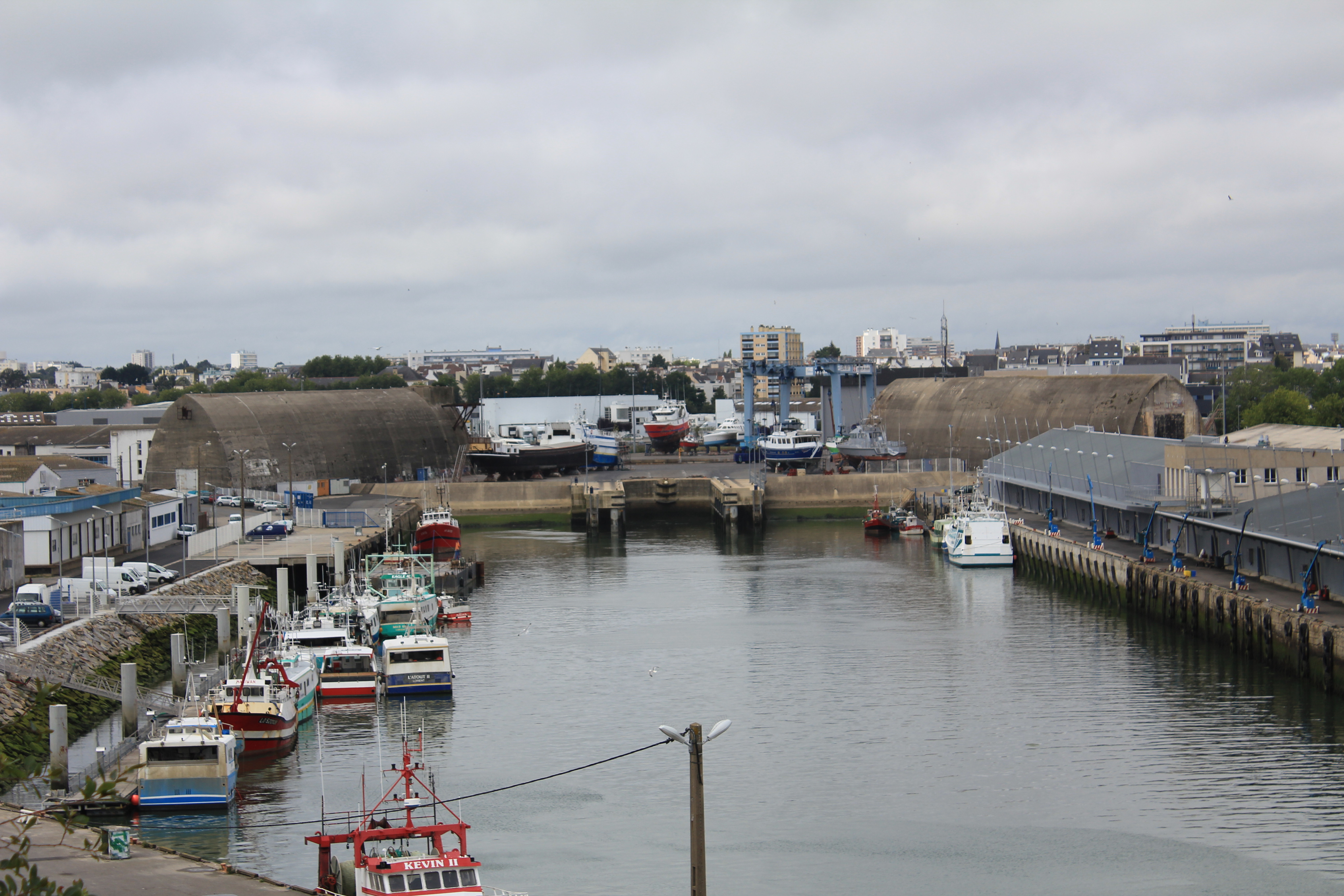
The long basin

The port complex encompasses two basins, collectively covering an area of approximately 10 hectares (25 acres). These basins are not subject to tidal constraints and can accommodate ships regardless of the tide or its amplitude. The large basin is oriented east-west and has a depth of 4 meters (13 ft). It is separated from Lorient roadstead by a breakwater that allows docking along 345 meters (1,132 ft) for ships with up to 8 meters (26 ft) of draft. The long basin is oriented north-south and has an access point for the boat hoist at its end.

The complex also encompasses nearly 1,850 meters (6,070 ft) of quays, which are designed to accommodate a range of boat types. The "Pourquoi Pas" quay, situated within the long basin on the northern side of the Keroman peninsula, features 165 meters (541 ft) of pontoons designated for artisanal fishing vessels.

==== Fish sales ====
The port houses three fish auctions, each catering to a distinct product category. Auction No. 2 is for offshore fishing products, operating from 8pm to 2am. Auction No. 3 is for coastal fishing sales, handling approximately 5,000 tons per year and active from 4 am. The Verrière Hall, located between auctions No. 1 and 2, specializes in offshore products and is equipped with the most modern computer sales equipment in the port.

Additionally, the port complex is home to the largest fish market station in Western France, equipped with 36 doors for large carriers. These are used for the supply of raw products to the port and the transportation of port products to cities such as Paris, Lyon, and Bordeaux.

==== Boat supplies ====
The initial auction number is no longer used for the sale of goods; instead, it is now employed for the port's container washing operations. These washing activities encompass the processing of approximately 1.5 million crates and 18,000 containers annually.

The port complex contains multiple ice factories, each serving a specific purpose. One is dedicated to supplying ice to boats, another to fish merchants, and three smaller factories serve fishmongers. The largest ice factory, situated on the southeast mole, produces 50 tons of flake ice daily and has a storage capacity of 150 tons.

==== Naval repairs ====
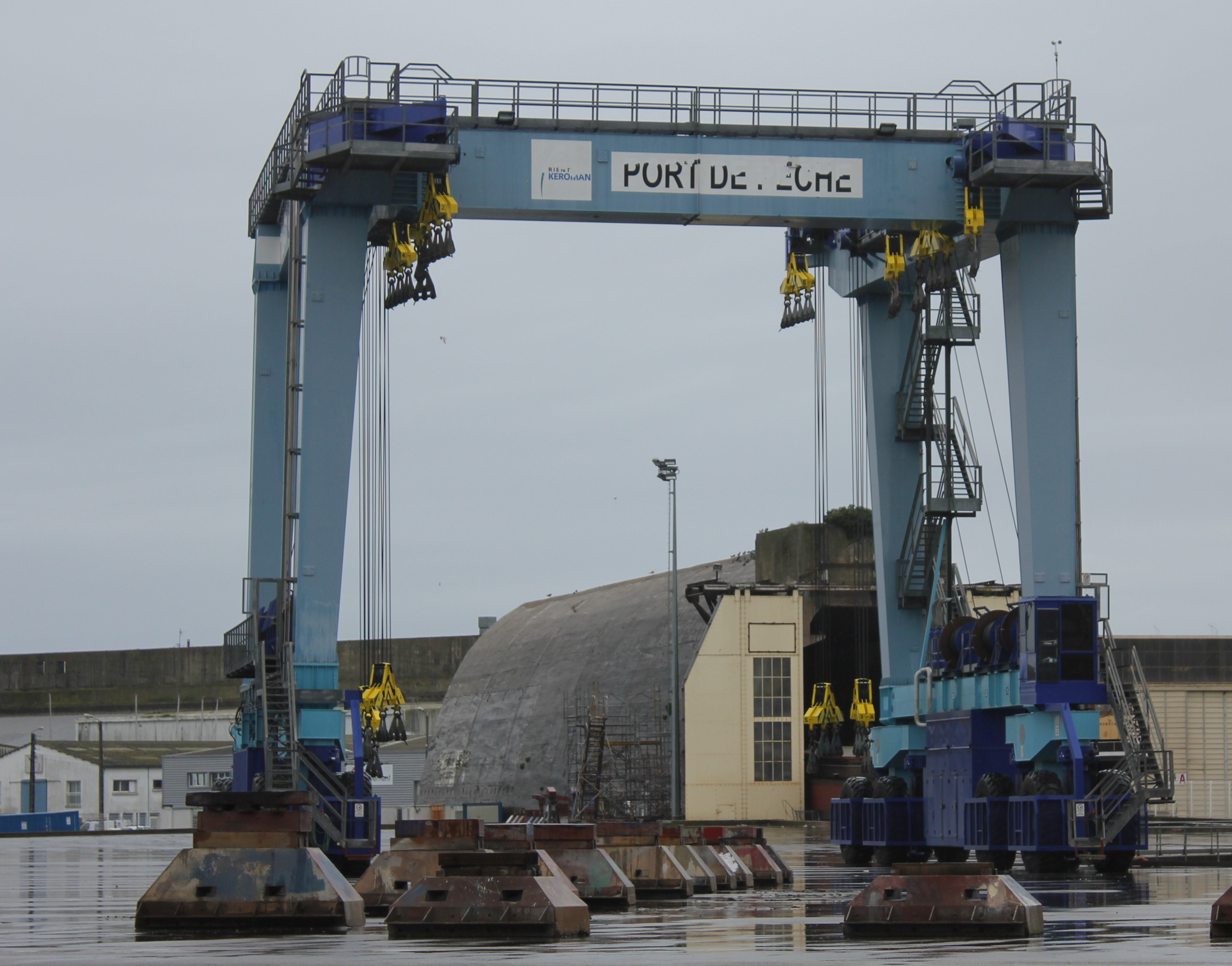
Boat elevator

The port encompasses a total area of 24,000 square meters (260,000 sq ft), with 11,500 square meters (124,000 sq ft) allocated for repairing vessels weighing up to 650 tons, 5,000 square meters (54,000 sq ft) for vessels weighing up to 250 tons, and 7,500 square meters (81,000 sq ft) for vessels weighing up to 150 tons. The port is equipped to accommodate a total of 20 boats simultaneously.

Since 2002, the port has been equipped with the most powerful boat hoist in Europe, with a lifting capacity of up to 650 tons. The port's slipway has been replaced by a boat hoist that can accommodate vessels of varying sizes and types, with an annual capacity of over 250 boats, ranging from 10 to 60 meters (33 to 197 ft).

A reception building constructed in 2007 provides facilities for companies engaged in activities related to mechanics, boiler making, hydraulics, and other similar fields.

== Activities ==
The Keroman fishing port employs 3,000 individuals across 270 companies, with 13,000 jobs generated throughout the Lorient agglomeration.

=== Fishing ===
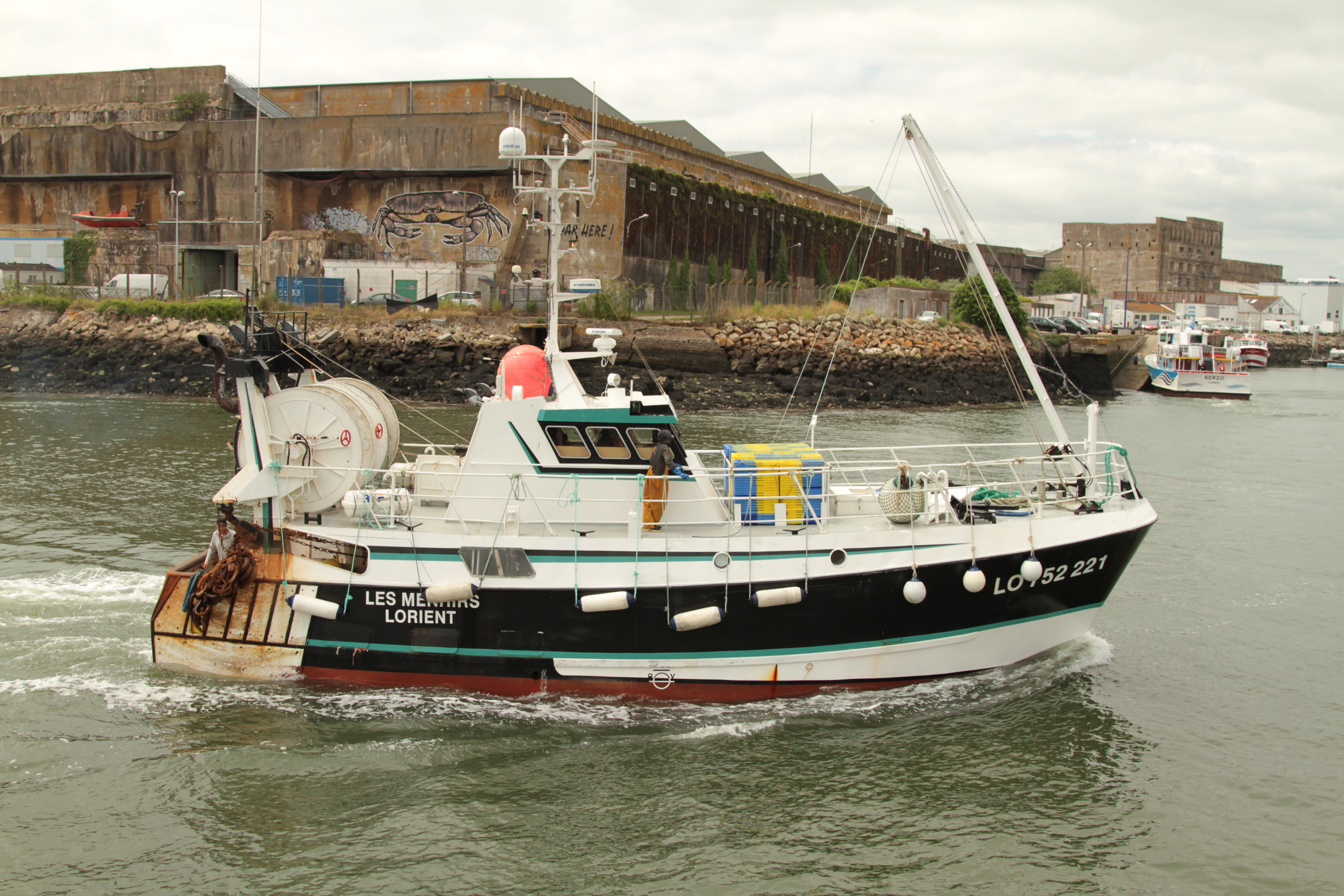
Les Menhirs (Keroman small-scale fishing company [Apak])

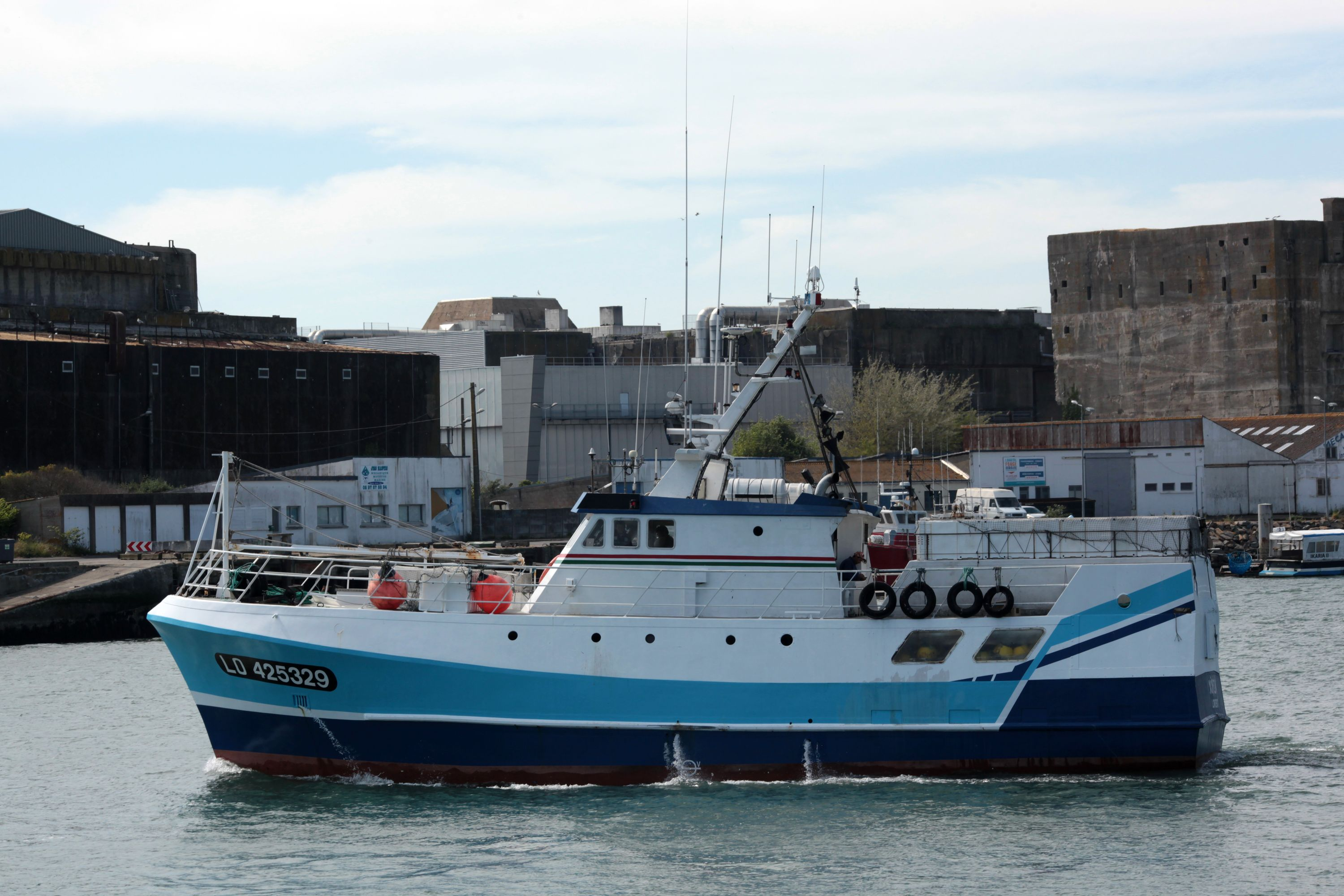
Miren (longliner).

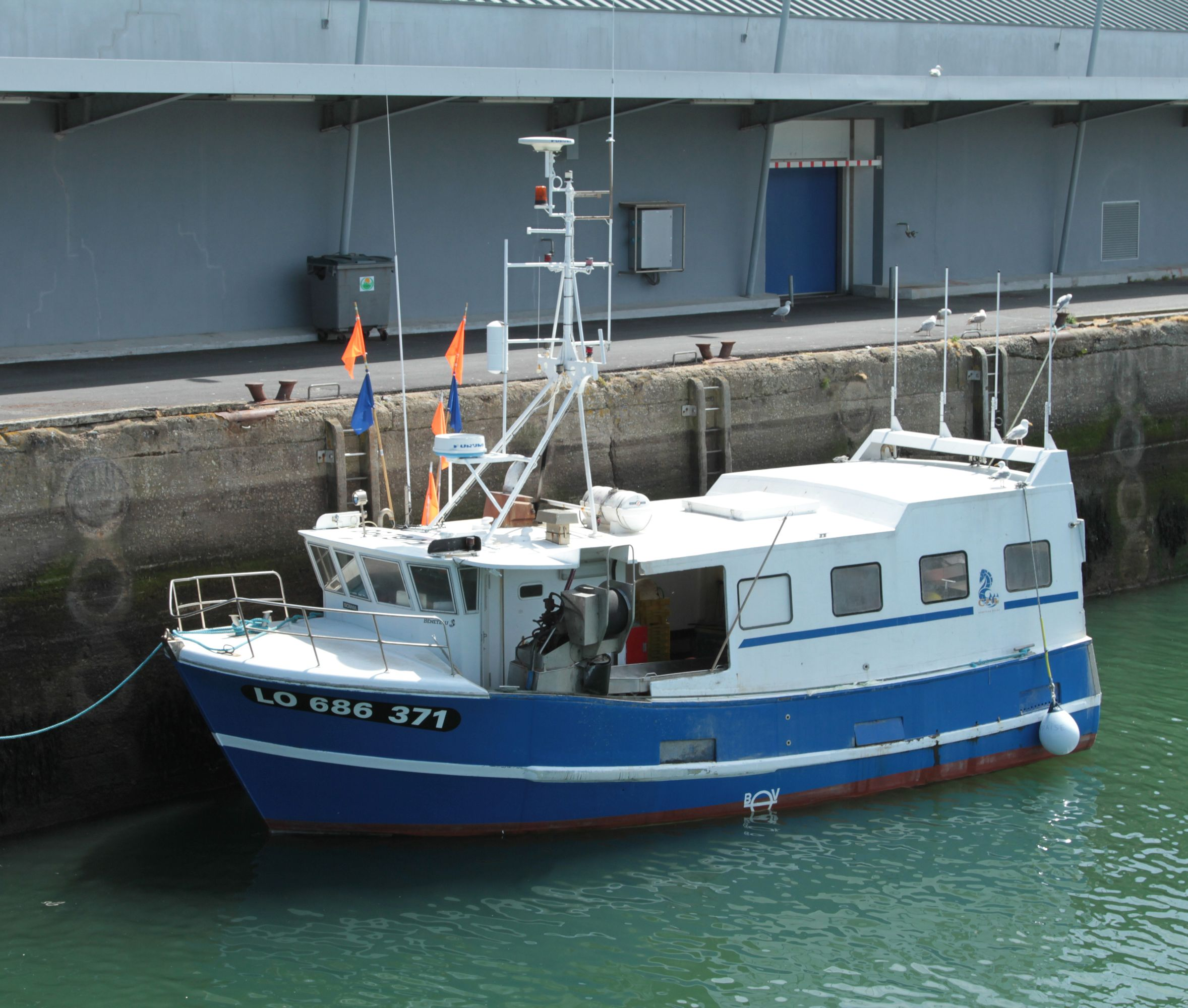
La Gavraise II (gillnetter).

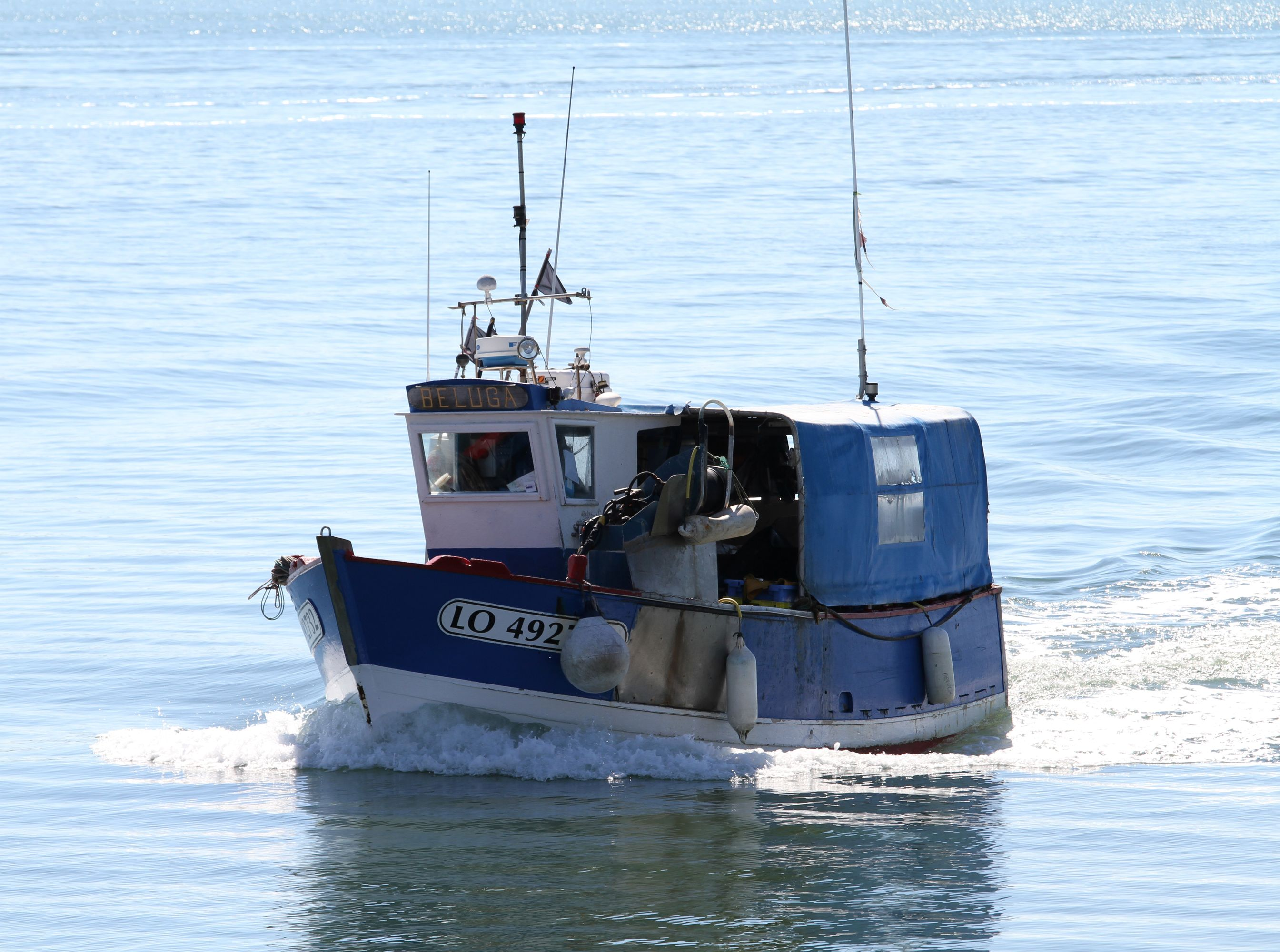
Beluga (caseyeur - longliner - trammel)

==== Typology ====
In 2010, 26,038 tons were sold at auction, with total sales amounting to 71.82 million euros. In ascending order, the ten most prevalent species are pollock, hake, ling, monkfish, sabrefish, grenadier, blue ling, conger, live Norway lobster, and tuna. In terms of value, Norway's lobster occupies the pinnacle of the port's fishing industry. The fleet encompasses 118 vessels, with 25 specialized in offshore fishing, 51 in coastal fishing, and 42 in small-scale fishing. Approximately half of these use trawls, while the remaining half employ nets, traps, or longlines.

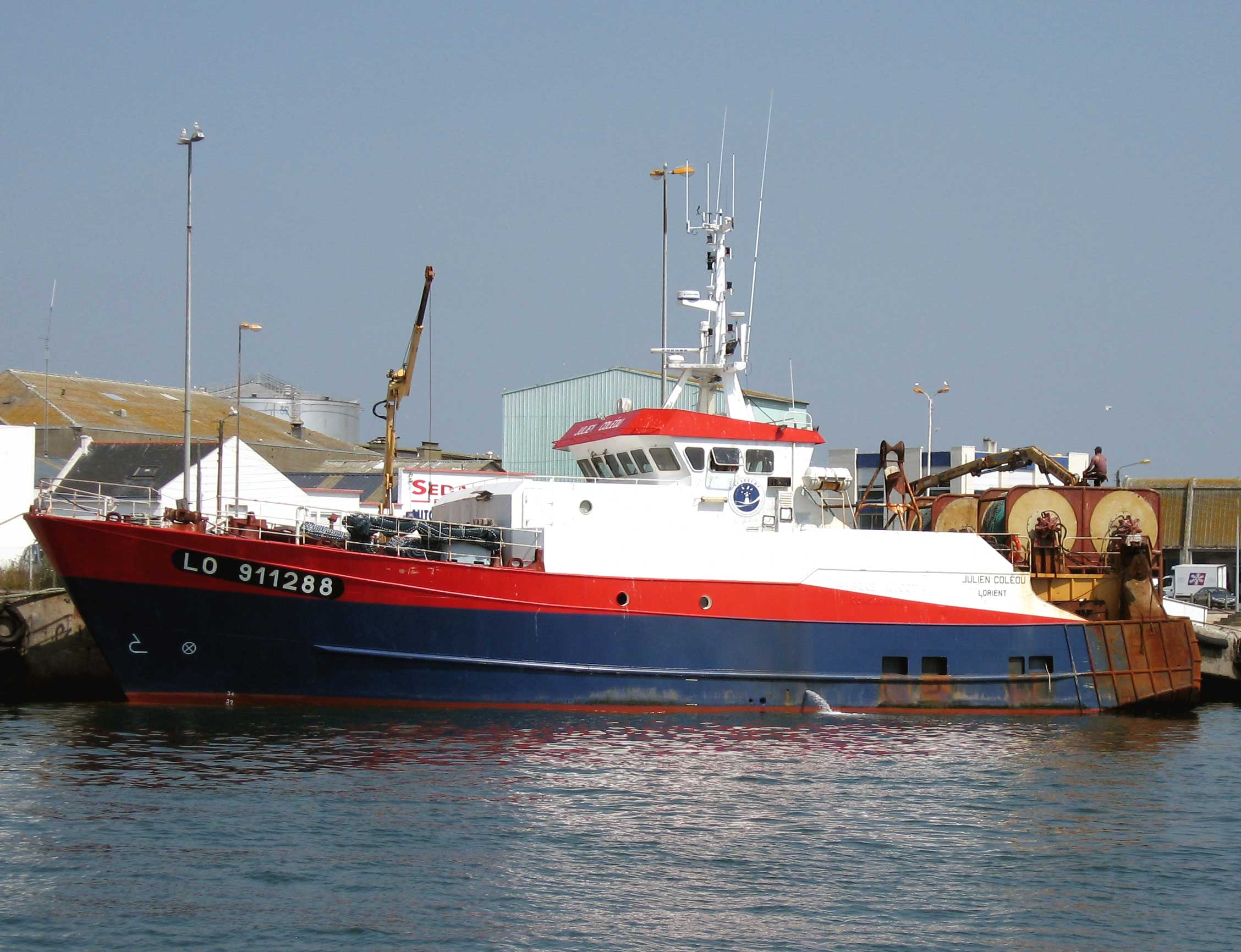
Scapêche trawler in port in July 2006.

In 2010, the offshore fleet comprised 25 vessels, with a length ranging from 30 to 45 meters (98 to 148 ft). The fishing grounds spanned the region from the Celtic Sea to northern Scotland, encompassing both Scapêche vessels and independent companies. Two large netters and one offshore trawler were engaged in the fishing of sole in the Bay of Biscay.

The fleet comprises approximately fifteen netters, with an average length of approximately 12 meters (39 ft). These vessels embark on day-long fishing trips, departing at 3 am and returning in the afternoon. Their primary catch comprises species such as sole, monkfish, hake, red mullet, and spider crab. Their fishing area extends from Doëlan (west) to Quiberon (east). During winter campaigns, the perimeter may extend further offshore, with the vessels staying overnight at Belle Île.

The lobster fleet comprises 35 units, with a length ranging from 12 to 18 meters (39 to 59 ft). Their fishing campaigns span a single day, extending from three miles south of Groix to 60 miles (97 km) south. Beyond this zone, Spanish ships, which subsequently unload in Lorient, assume responsibility for the catch. In addition to lobster, the Lorient fleet also engages in the fishing of other species, including hake, sole, and monkfish.

The remaining sixty vessels engage in a more diverse range of activities, including seasonal fishing with a variety of techniques, such as lines, pots, nets, and dredges, in different locations. Additionally, there are 130 professional shore fishermen.

==== Fishing volume trends ====
Fishing volume trends in tons
1928	1931	1939	1945	1952	1963	1972	1974
15,800	23,000	33,066	1,432	35,800	74,400	62,914	78,100

1982	1986	2002	2003	2004	2005	2006	2007
65,036	69,444	26,258	27,349	26,788	27,211	23,422	22,327

2008	2009	2010	2011	2014	2015	2020
18,913	22,106	26,038	25,922	26,652	26,514	17,898

The port experienced a significant decline in activity (−64%) due to the constraints imposed by the health crisis. Nevertheless, it retained its position as the second-largest fishing port in France in 2020.

=== Processing ===
The processing sector at Keroman Port and other regional fishing ports handles approximately 100,000 tons of fish annually. Since 1993, the port's commercial unit has imported fish by truck, primarily from Scotland and Ireland, (Note: Fish is landed in ports in northern Brittany and then trucked to Lorient.) to supplement the catches made in Lorient.

A total of 25 active companies are involved in the production process. The distribution of output is as follows: 60% is distributed by large retailers, 15% by wholesalers and restaurants, 5% by fishmongers and direct sales, and the remaining 15% is distributed by other processing companies. These include the Japanese Nippon Suisan Kaisha, which is located in the neighboring town of Kervignac.

=== Repairs and constructions ===
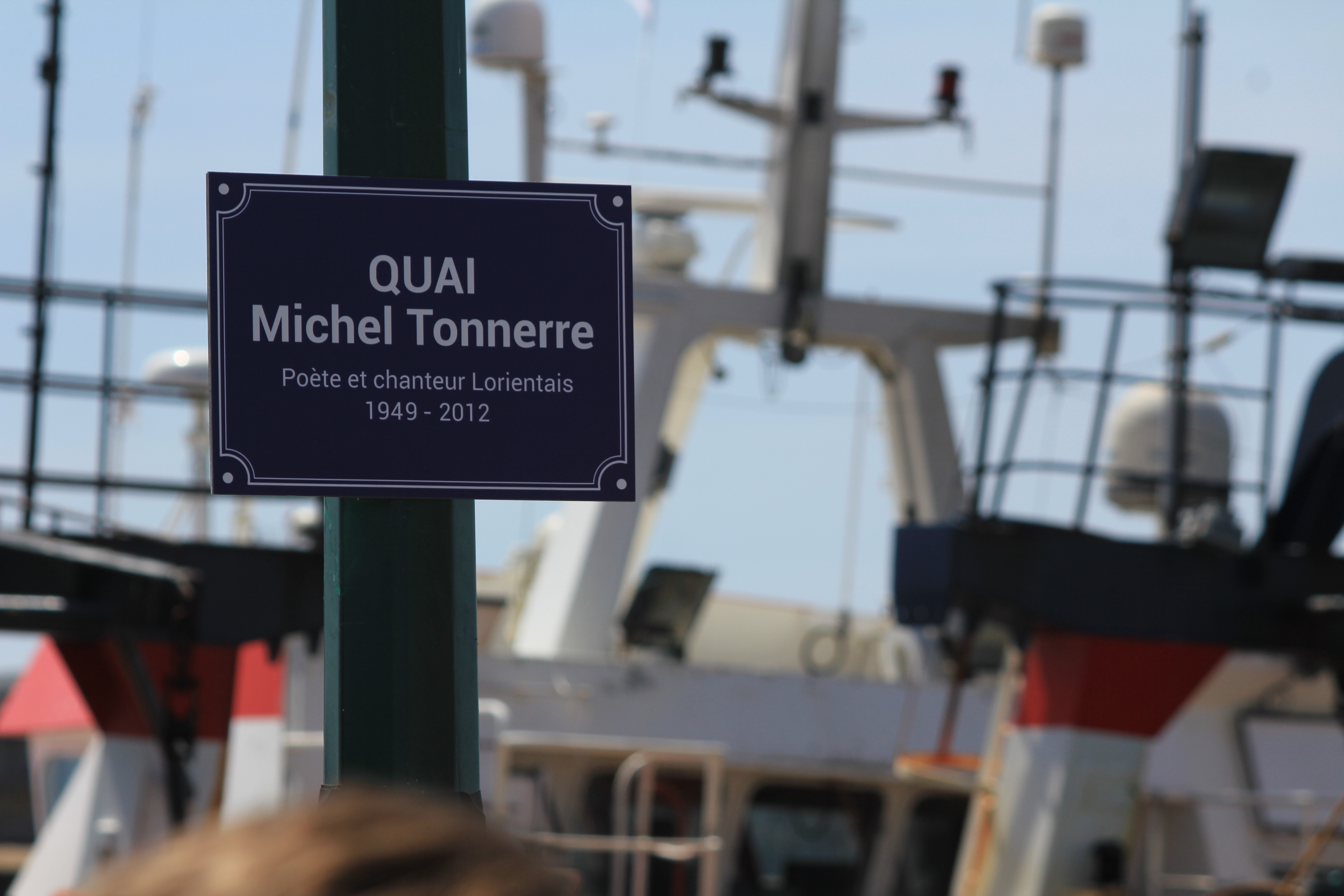
Plaque dedicated to Michel Tonnerre on the quay of the same name.

In 2009, the naval repair area handled 273 boat movements for repair operations. Of these, 40% involved fishing vessels, 20% pleasure boats, and 19% passenger boats; 5% each were accounted for by coasters, military ships, and wave-breaking pontoons.

Construction yards frequently use the site for the construction of racing and cruise boats, the manufacture of wave-breakers for ports in the Lorient roadstead and other regional ports, and the fulfillment of more specific orders, such as the construction of a lock gate for the port of Vannes.

=== Cultural activities ===
The port also plays a role in the organization of cultural activities. One such event is the annual festival, "Keroman Port en fête", which takes place in late June. This festival features a variety of workshops that provide insight into the port's operations and musical performances.

The Lorient Interceltic Festival features many events held at this site. A cotriade is held in the early days of the festival and traditionally marks its commencement. During the second weekend of the festival, a series of concerts, collectively known as the "Night of the Fishing Port", is held at the slipway area, accompanied by a celebration on Avenue de la Perrière. Additionally, other concerts may be intermittently organized during the festival at this site, including performances by the American band Texas in 2011 and the Irish band The Corrs to conclude the 2016 edition.

The Keroman fishing port was an inspiration for musical compositions by artists such as Michel Tonnerre and Soldat Louis.

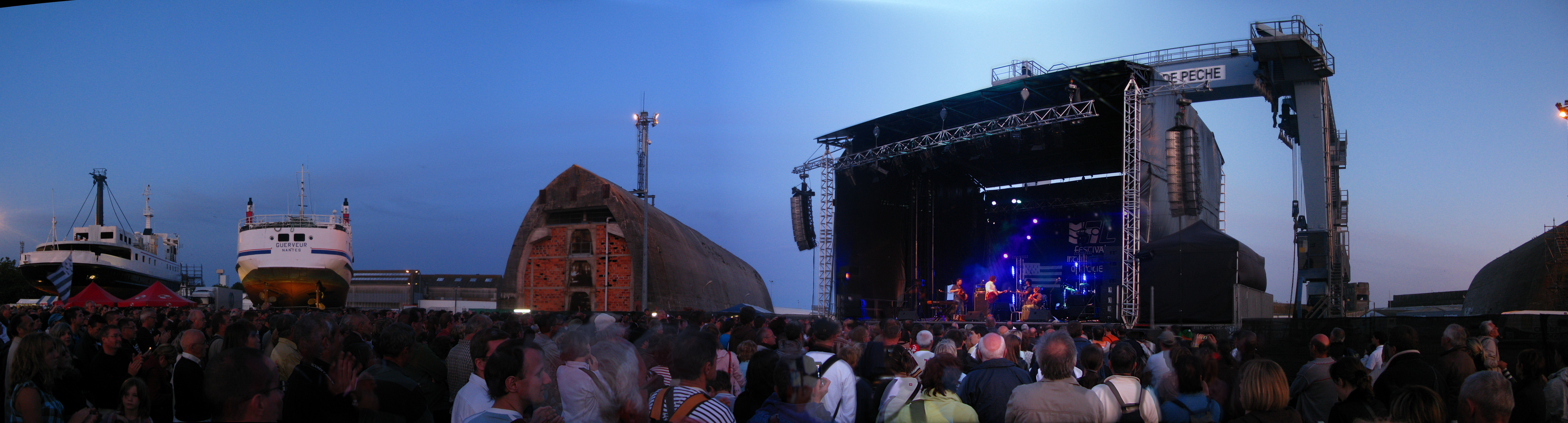
Concert on the port slipway at the 2009 Lorient Interceltic Festival.

== Foreign investments ==
In late 2020, the Keroman Port Company was awarded a contract for the Duqm fishing port construction, situated on 250 hectares. Duqm is a modest port city in the Sultanate of Oman that Omani leaders aspire to transform into a nascent regional hub as part of the sultanate's "Vision 2040." It could benefit from the maritime and fishing expertise of the Breton port. It is anticipated that a considerable number of French companies will be involved in the project. Nevertheless, following the assertion by one of the founders of SAS Ker'Oman that fresh fish could be transported by cargo plane from Duqm in the long term, a controversy emerged. This was met with criticism and opposition from environmentalists and Loïg Chesnais-Girard, the president of the region and a former member of the Socialist Party. Meanwhile, the Radical Left has identified an opportunity to "secure employment in Lorient" through Jean-Philippe Olivieri. Local fishermen have denounced the absurdity of sourcing fish from Oman on Reporterre, while Damien Girard, an ecologist elected in Lorient, has expressed concern about the environmental impact of these air travels. In contrast, a Ker'Oman shareholder, Maurice Benoish, has defended the project as an economic benefit since the demand for fish exceeds the supply.

== See also ==
- FC Lorient, soccer team created in the port environment

== Bibliography ==
=== Books ===
- Haudrère, Philippe; Le Bouëdec, Gérard; Dupuy, Roger; Estienne, René (1988). Histoire de Lorient. Univers de la France et des pays francophones (in French) (1st ed.). Toulouse: Éditions Privat. ISBN 2-7089-8268-0.
- Frey, François (1987). 60e anniversaire du port de pêche de Lorient-Kéroman : 1927-1987 (in French). Lorient: Chambre de commerce et d'industrie du Morbihan. ISBN 2-900770-04-1. LCCN 90202546.
- Le Bouëdec, Gérard; Le Brigan, Dominique (2014). Lorient Keroman : Du port de pêche à la cité du poisson (in French). Rennes: Marines Édition. ISBN 978-2-35743-124-9. Archived from the original on 1 December 2017.
- Yhuel-Bertin, Emmanuelle (2017). Keroman, une aventure humaine (in French). Le Faouët: Liv'Éditions. ISBN 978-2-84497-427-3. Archived from the original on 18 January 2021.

=== Journals ===
- Chaumeil, Louis (1939). "Abrégé d'histoire de Lorient de la fondation (1666) à nos jours (1939)". Annales de Bretagne (in French). 46 (46-1-2): 66–87. Archived from the original on 4 June 2024.
- Martinez-Roda, Frederico J (1983). "L'ensemble portuaire de Lorient". Norois (in French) (119): 407–420. Archived from the original on 2 August 2011.
- Philipponneau, Fournet (1979). "Lorient, port de pêche industrielle". Norois (in French) (102): 193–207. Archived from the original on 30 May 2024.
- Le Coz, Jeannine (1963). "Un exemple d'attraction de main-d'œuvre maritime et rurale par la ville : l'agglomération lorientaise". Norois (in French) (38): 178–184. Archived from the original on 10 March 2024.
- Robert-Muller, C (1927). "Le nouveau port de pêche de Lorient. Chalutage et charbon". Annales de Géographie (in French). 36 (201): 193–212. Archived from the original on 2 March 2024.
