= La Tanche (ship) =

French trawler used between 1918 and 1940

- Approximate silhouette of the patrol trawler La Tanche, c. 1918

History

France
- Name: La Tanche
- Home port: La Rochelle
- Fate: Wrecked

General characteristics
- Type: Patrol boat
- Length: 40.22 m
- Beam: 7.12 m
- Draft: 4.87 m
- Installed power: 450 ch
- Speed: 9 knots

La Tanche (French: [la tɑ̃ʃ]) was a French trawler used for a variety of activities between its commissioning in 1918 at La Rochelle and its sinking in 1940 just outside the roadstead of Lorient.

The vessel was first used as a patrol boat by the French Navy in 1919. It was then bought by the French Secretary of the Merchant Navy in 1920 and used by the Office Scientifique et Technique des Pêches Maritimes until 1928. It was then bought by a Fécamp shipowner to sail as a trawler until 1940.

During the Battle of France, it reached the roadstead of Lorient on June 19, 1940, taking on board some 250 people, including many young people from the fleet's apprentice mechanics school, who were also fleeing the advance of German troops. On the same day, at 4.10pm, the ship hit a mine in the western channel of Les Courreaux de Groix. Only a dozen passengers and crew survived the wreck.

== Design ==
=== Development of the patrol trawler fleet ===
During World War I, the French Navy requisitioned fishing boats for various military operations along the French coast. After a few modifications, the boats were deemed operational and able to carry out the missions entrusted to them under acceptable conditions. This experience prompted the General Staff to order eight patrol trawlers from the Delaunay Belleville shipyard in La Rochelle on December 13, 1916.

La Tanche was one of the 8 small vessels built by the yard, along with L'Ablette, L'Anguille II, Le Barbeau, La Brême, Le Brochet, La Truite and La Perche. With the exception of the latter, which was built in Nantes, all were built in La Rochelle. The war caused many delays in the construction of these units, and La Tanche was not completed until June 9, 1918.

=== Specifications ===
Like the other units in this series, the Tanche had an overall length of 40.22 m and a beam of 7.12 m. Its draft measured 4.87 m. It had a gross tonnage of 276.55 and a net tonnage of 90.79.

The ship was powered by a 450 hp triple-expansion reciprocating steam engine, enabling La Tanche to sail at a speed of 9 knots.

In its initial configuration, it was fitted with a 90 mm cannon and a 47 mm gun.

== Operation ==
=== French Navy ===
The ship entered active service for the French Navy on December 10, 1918, and on January 22, 1919 it was placed in reserve with the Loire zone flotilla in Group B, based at Lorient. On the 25th of the same month, it was assigned to the Syrian flotilla, but on February 14, 1919 a counter-order reassigned it to Rochefort to join the Bay of Biscay patrol division, where it remained until September 25 of the same year. On that date, it was assigned to the Provence flotilla, where it was commissioned as a fishery warden a month later.

At the end of 1919, La Tanche was one of a group of 71 patrol boats the navy was seeking to dispose of after the war, and was sent to Marseille for decommissioning.

=== Merchant navy ===
La Tanche was purchased by the Secretary of the Merchant Navy to be transferred to the Office Scientifique et Technique des Pêches Maritimes. The ship departed Marseille for Lorient on February 1, 1920. After a stopover in Vigo on February 18, it arrived in Brittany on February 20. The interior of the ship was transformed in the Lorient arsenal: the fish holds were converted into six rooms that could house laboratories and holds for various equipment.

Between June 6, 1921 and August 1, 1928, La Tanche worked from Lorient (Note: It was at this time that the town developed its fishing activities, notably through the establishment of the Keroman fishing port, whose main infrastructures were built between 1919 and 1927.) on research campaigns in a variety of fields. For seven years, a crew of 18, including three fishermen, carried out missions in the Bay of Biscay and off the coast of Morocco. It was under the command of Raymond Rallier du Baty, then two officers from the fleet's crews, and was equipped with nansen bottles with thermometers and several sampling dredges capable of operating at depths of over 1,000 meters. Every year, with the exception of 1925, the ship carried out a four-month campaign on the Atlantic coast. These focused on tuna migration and the influence of propeller noise on fish, among other things.

However, the Office Scientifique et Technique des Pêches Maritimes ran into financial difficulties, despite assistance from the French Navy, and had to part company with La Tanche. The vessel was finally withdrawn from service on November 28, 1928 and put up for sale.

=== Fishing ===
La Tanche was sold to a demolition yard on April 20, 1930, but was then sold again to a Fécamp shipowner, Merrienne Frères. It was refitted as a trawler in Le Havre, and resumed its new activities the following year. At the time, it had a thirty-strong crew, fishing herring with gillnets.

The vessel was used as a fishing boat until the outbreak of World War II. At the start of the war, on September 9, 1939, the ship was requisitioned by the French Navy, which considered its militarization on September 16. However, the conversion was abandoned on September 20, and the vessel was returned to its owner on the following October 20. It continued to fish for herring, then mackerel, throughout the phoney war period.

== Ending of the boat ==
=== Exodus towards Lorient ===
The exodus of civilians fleeing the advance of German troops in May–June 1940 brought many people to Lorient. From June 15, ships in the city began to evacuate people by sea, with some heading for England. German bombers laid sea mines in Lorient harbor to prevent ships from reaching Allied troops.

On June 18, the Maritime prefect ordered all fishing boats to evacuate Lorient, and many civilians and soldiers fled the German advance. Against this backdrop, La Tanche arrived in port on the morning of June 19, returning from a mackerel fishing trip. It joined another boat from the same owner, Le Saint Pierre, which had arrived in Lorient under similar circumstances.

On the morning of June 19, only these two trawlers remained in the Keroman fishing port to be used by the refugees. The 70 tons of coal needed to run the boats were loaded by hand, as the port's crane operators had left town the day before. The first of the two boats, Le Saint Pierre, set sail the same day with refugees, French and Polish soldiers from Coëtquidan and soldiers from various units on board. (Note: The first Germans arrived at Lorient on June 21)

=== Shipwreck ===
Around 3 pm, La Tanche set sail with around 250 people on board, including apprentices from the French Navy's mechanics school. It entered the western channel of the Courreaux de Groix at 4 pm, (Note: Le Saint Pierre passed through the eastern pass of Les Courreaux.) but the channel had not yet been dredged, and German aircraft had dropped submarine mines. At 4:10 pm, just outside the harbor, in the Courreaux de Groix, the ship jumped on one of the magnetic mines dropped by a German plane near the rocks called "Les Errants" and "La Truie", and sank in a few minutes. The Courrier de Groix was the first boat to arrive on the scene, followed by a pinasse from Gâvres.

Very few survivors were counted, barely a dozen, many of whom died of their wounds. One hundred and seventeen bodies were recovered over the following months, in an area stretching from Clohars-Carnoët to Quiberon.

== Posterity ==
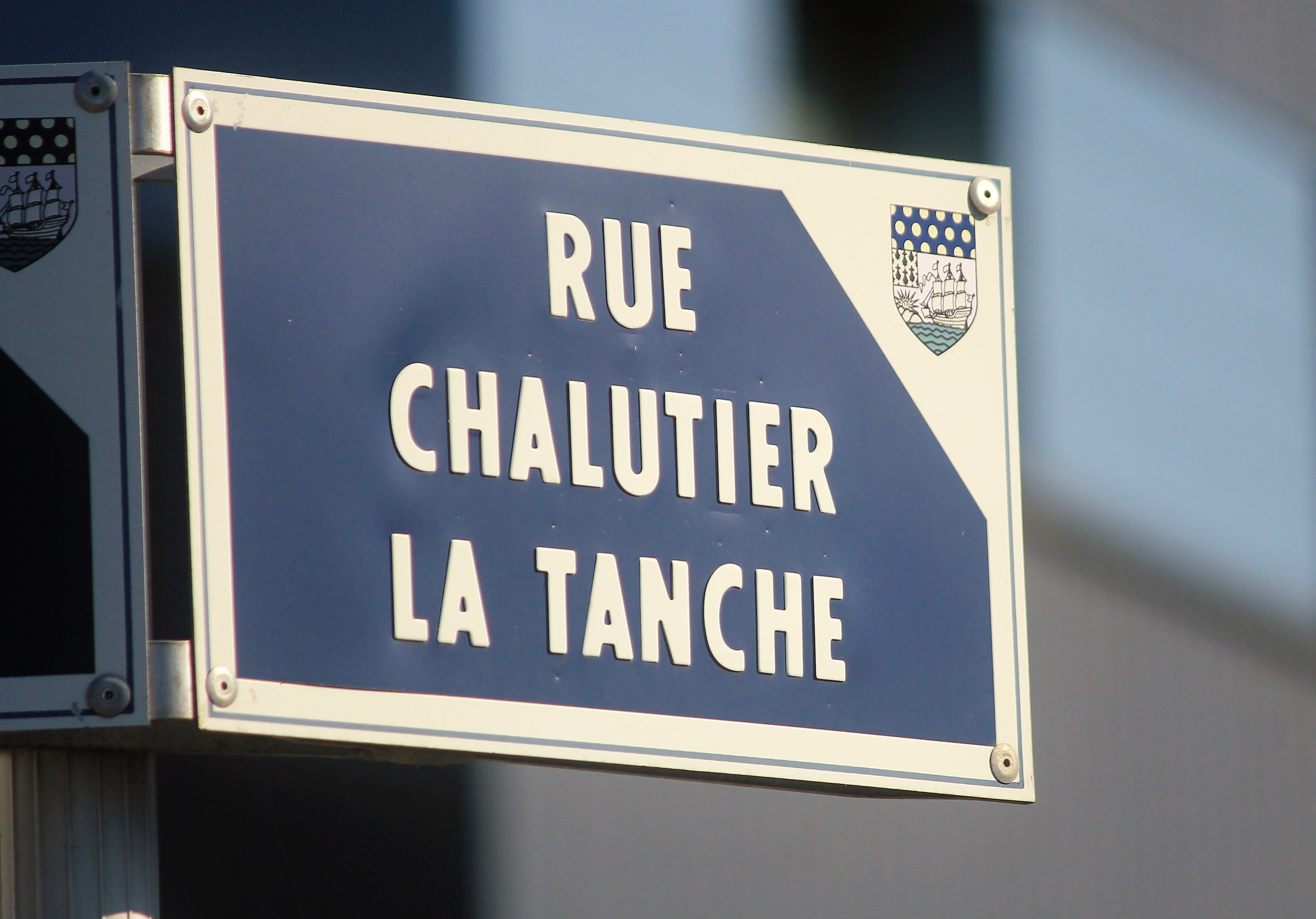
A street was named in honor of the trawler and the victims of its sinking in Lorient.

Several victims were buried in the days following the wreck at the Beg tal Men cemetery in Larmor-Plage. The municipality subsequently erected a monument bearing the inscription "La commune de Larmor-Plage Aux Naufragés de La Tanche Morts pour La France Le 19 juin 1940" ("The commune of Larmor-Plage to the shipwrecked men of La Tanche who died for France on June 19, 1940"). The dead recovered in the following days, whose bodies had not been claimed or identified, were buried in Lorient in the Kerentrech cemetery. Others were also buried in the Groix cemetery.

In 1987, a stele was erected in the Kerentrech cemetery in Lorient, in memory of the victims of this shipwreck. Commemorations are held every year at the Beg tal Men cemetery in Larmor-Plage and the Kerentrech cemetery in Lorient.

== Bibliography ==
- Maurette, Jean-Louis; Moriceau, Christophe (2011). Épaves en baie de Lorient (in French). Gourin: Éditions des Montagnes Noires. ISBN 978-2-919305-07-0.
- Nières, Claude (1988). Histoire de Lorient (in French). Toulouse: Privat. ISBN 978-2-7089-8268-0. LCCN 89121626.
- Estival, Bernard (2003). Un siècle de navires scientifiques français (in French). Éditions du Gerfaut. ISBN 978-2-914622-21-9.
