= Roadstead of Lorient =

Roadstead or bay in France

- Rade de Lorient (French); Lenn-vor an Oriant (Breton)
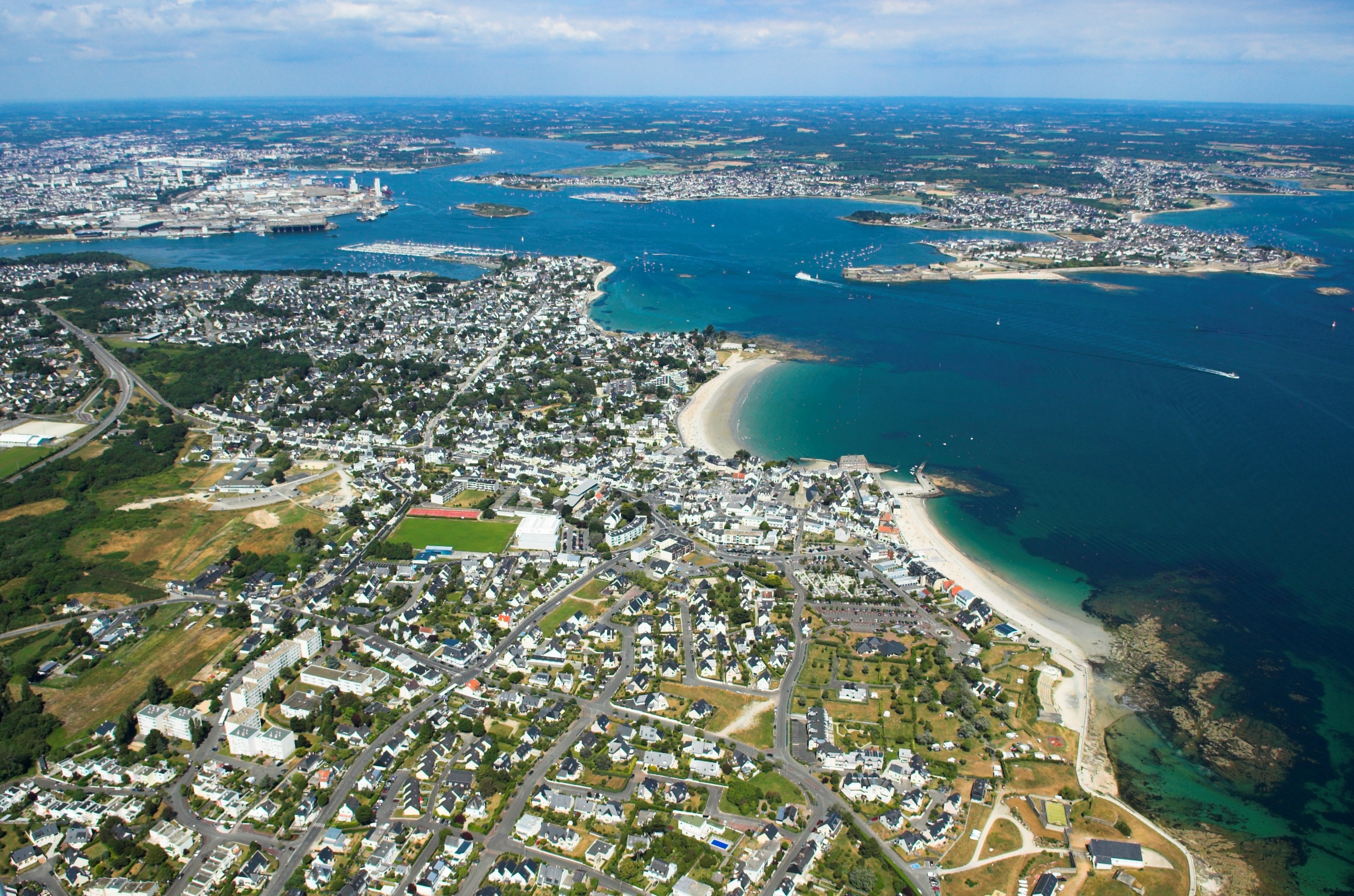
- Aerial view of Lorient roadstead from the southwest.

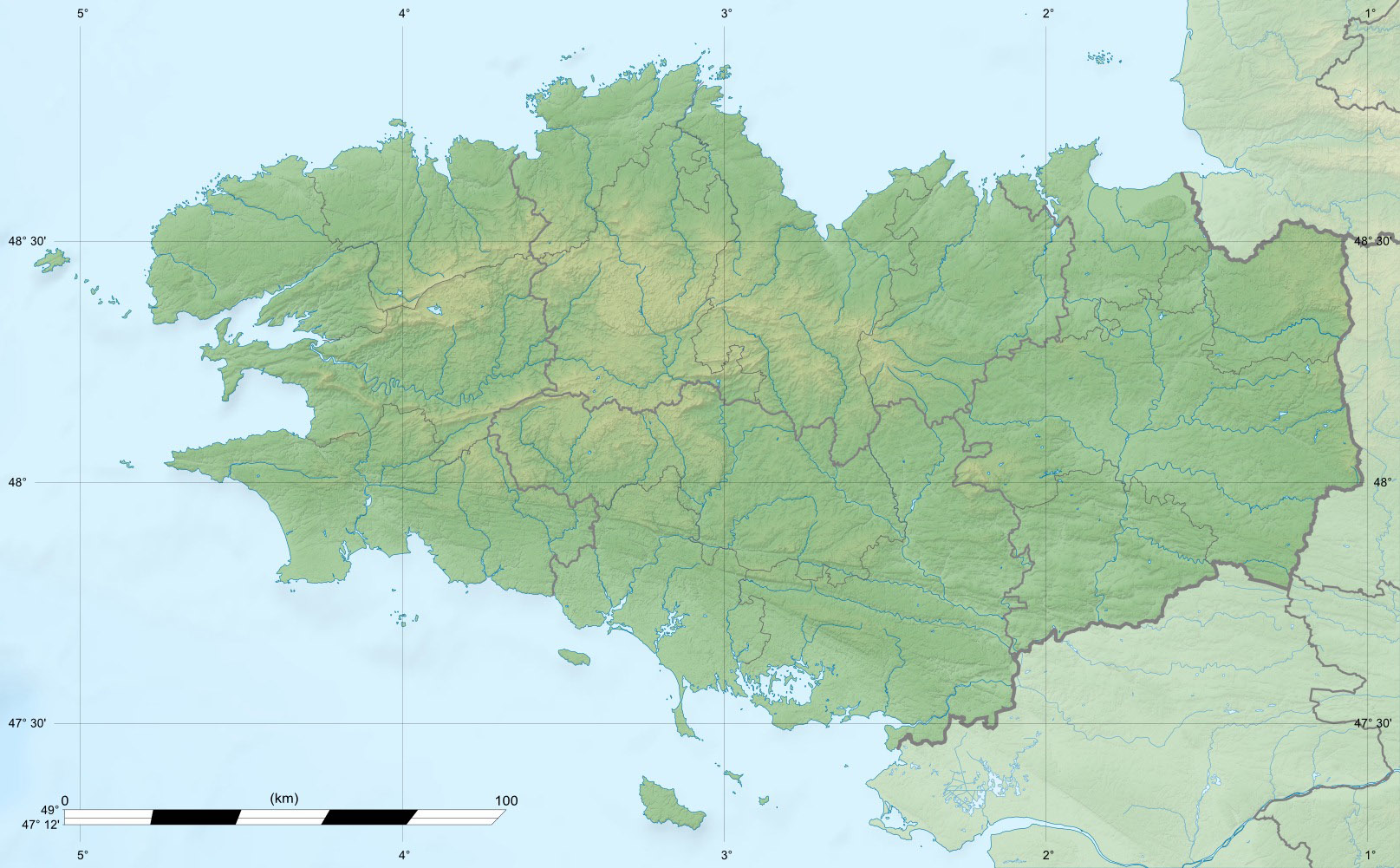
- Location within France Location within Brittany
- Coordinates: 47°43′52″N 3°21′14″W
- Type: Roadstead
- Basin countries: France
- Islands: Île Saint-Michel

Topographic map of the roadstead

The roadstead of Lorient (French: Rade de Lorient, Breton: Lenn-von an Oriant) is a roadstead located to the west of Morbihan in Brittany, France.

== Geography ==
The harbor of Lorient constitutes the mouths of the rivers Blavet, Scorff and the Ter in the Atlantic Ocean. It has several port facilities, including marinas but also the infrastructure of the Lorient Submarine Base. Oriented northeast-southwest, it has an island in its center, Île Saint-Michel, and communicates with the Atlantic Ocean to the south by two passes, the Passe du Sud and the Passe de l'Ouest, separated by reefs. Its northern part is more specifically called the harbor of Pen-Mané while that to the south is called the harbor of Port-Louis.

It is bordered to the west by the communes of Larmor-Plage, Lorient and Lanester and to the east by those of Kervignac, Locmiquélic, Port-Louis and Gâvres.

== Port facilities ==
=== Lorient ===
- Lorient Submarine Base
- Keroman fishing harbour: the second-largest fishing port in France in tonnage and first in added value. 27,000 tons per year, 3,000 direct jobs including 700 on board and 130 boats registered in the port of Lorient.
- Port of Kergroise: second-largest port in Brittany, 2.6 million tonnes per year (as of 2021) including petroleum products, animal feed, sand, containers.
- Passenger port: more than 457,500 passages per year to the islands of Groix and Belle-Île-en-Mer.
- Naval base: nearly 3,800 soldiers work between the arsenal, the Naval Aeronautics Base of Lann-Bihoué as well as the staff of the maritime force of marine riflemen and commandos.
- Marina: 370 pontoon berths in the port of Lorient.

=== Larmor-Plage ===
- Kernevel marina (1,000 berths)

=== Locmiquélic ===
- Marinas Sainte-Catherine (457 berths) and Pen Mané (150 berths)
- Fishing port

=== Port-Louis ===
- Marina (450 berths)
- Fishing port

=== Gâvres ===
- Marina (57 berths)

== Wrecks ==
More than 350 wrecks are listed in the harbor, including that of the Isère, the ship that transported the Statue of Liberty to New York.
