= Olympic Bravery =

Shipwreck in Ushant

History
- Name: Olympic Bravery
- Owner: Olympic Maritime, Monte Carlo
- Port of registry: Liberia
- Builder: Chantiers de l'Atlantique, Saint-Nazaire
- Launched: 1975
- Fate: Wrecked 24 January 1976

General characteristics
- Type: Oil tanker
- Tonnage: 280,000 tons
- Length: 343 m (1,125 ft 4 in)
- Beam: 51.9 m (170 ft 3 in)
- Speed: 16 knots (30 km/h; 18 mph)

Olympic Bravery was an oil tanker operating under a Liberian flag of convenience. The vessel was built by Chantiers de l'Atlantique in Saint-Nazaire and launched in 1975 with Christina Onassis as godmother. Olympic Bravery was operated by the shipping group of Greek shipowner Aristotle Onassis.

The tanker sank on 24 January 1976, on the reefs of Yuzin Bay, on the north coast of Ushant Island, Brittany. The tanker ran aground empty, but 800 tonnes of fuel oil were enough to oil several kilometers of coastline. All thirty crew members were rescued.

The wreck was one of the biggest oil spills in France, and particularly in Brittany, along with the Torrey Canyon, Böhlen, Amoco Cadiz, Gino, Tanio, and Erika.

== Shipwreck ==
On 23 January 1976, at the request of Chantiers de l'Atlantique, the ship finally left the docks for Forsand, Norway, where it was laid up as a new vessel. The departure was delayed several times due to a number of technical incidents.

Olympic Bravery then made a technical stopover at Brest, France following boiler problems, which were taken care of by the AFO shipyard. On the night of the 24th, after setting sail again, the ship passed through a heavy storm and suffered a series of technical problems, which led to drifting and running aground north of Ushant, near the island of Keller.

After a month and a half of attempts to refloat the vessel, on 13 March, following a heavy storm, it broke in two and 800 tonnes of fuel oil spilled onto the surrounding coastline. The previous day, however, the shipowner had finally signed a contract to pump out the fuel oil and refloat the vessel. Despite the use of dispersants, the fuel oil spread over four kilometers (2.5 mi) of the Ushant coastline, which was finally cleaned up by the French Army with shovels and buckets. The 400 tonnes of fuel remaining in the bunkers were eventually pumped out after reheating, and the wreck was sold for scrap for a symbolic franc. The heavy fuel oil on board was used solely for propulsion, as the vessel was otherwise empty.

The thirty or so crew members were saved by the rescue services, but four members of a Super Frelon rescue helicopter perished during a reconnaissance flight.

== Controversies ==
The shipowner was accused by journalists of having deliberately caused the loss of his vessel, or at least of having abandoned it after it had run aground, due to the severe crisis in the maritime transport of petroleum products at the time.

Looting was also found on the wreck, arousing suspicions among Ushant islanders and provoking indignation among local mayors.

== The wreckage ==
Although sold for scrap, the wreck was eventually left in place. Highly dislocated and damaged, its remains extend continuously over more than 350 meters (1,150 ft) in length, some 100 m (330 ft) from the coast, in water depths ranging from 8 to 32 m (26 to 105 ft).
