= Lorient Submarine Base =

Defunct submarine naval base in France

- Lorient, France
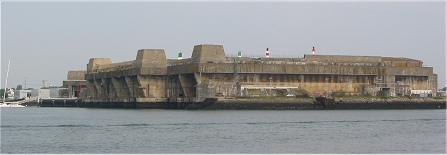
- KIII submarine pens at Lorient

Site information
- Type: Submarine base
- Owner: Nazi Germany (1941–1945): Kriegsmarine; France (1945–Present): French Navy

Location
- Shown on Lorient map
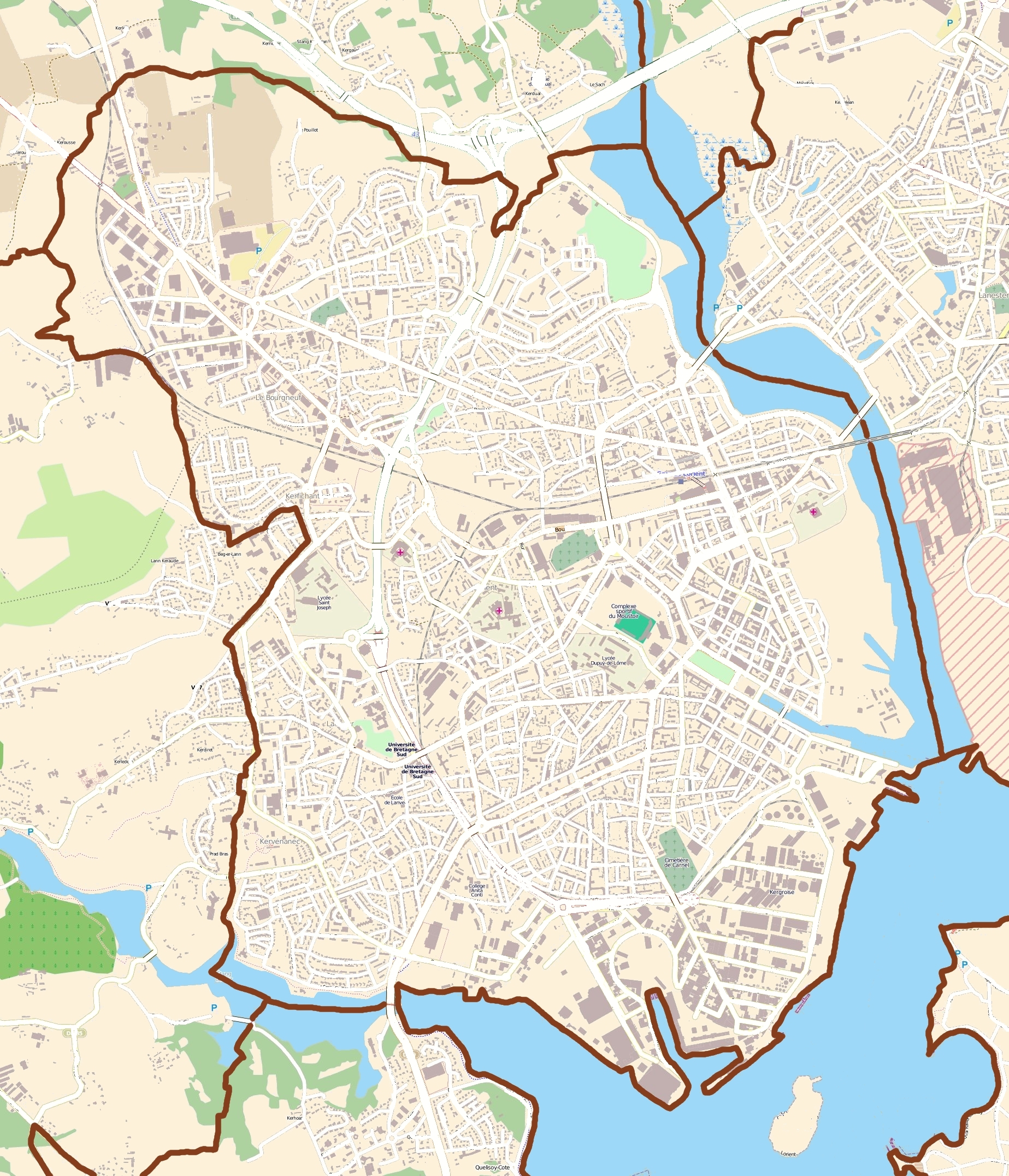
- Location within Lorient
- Coordinates: 47.72917°N 3.37028°W

Site history
- Built: 1941-43
- Built by: Nazi Germany

Lorient Submarine Base was a submarine naval base located in Lorient, France. It was built in 1941 by the German Kriegsmarine, and was continued to be enlarged until 1943. After the German defeat it was used by the French Navy. It was decommissioned in 1995 and converted to civilian use.

== Lorient U-boat base ==
After the fall of France in June 1940 the head of Germany’s U-boat Arm, Konteradmiral Karl Dönitz, was keen to use the French Atlantic ports as forward bases for his U-boat force then engaged in a commerce war against the United Kingdom. Prior to this U-boats had to travel from ports in Germany to their patrol areas, losing valuable time in the long transits necessary. From the coast of France these distances were substantially reduced, with a corresponding increase in the active range and endurance of the U-boat force. Dönitz lost no time in sending teams of engineers and base personnel to the ports, beginning with Lorient.

Already a French naval base, Lorient had the facilities Dönitz needed, as well as numerous cafes and bars, and a red-light district. A special train loaded with replenishment supplies and ordnance, and the personnel to manage them arrived in Lorient at the end of June, and the first U-boat, U-30 docked a week later. U-30 had departed Wilhelmshaven on 8 June and arrived at Lorient on 7 July after a 30 day patrol which had accounted for 5 allied ships. She was repaired and resupplied in 7 days, departing on her next patrol on 13 July.

The first area put into use as a U-boat dock was the fisherman's wharf of Keroman(fr) on the River Blavet, between the districts of Keroman and La Perriere. This was a quayed inlet with a boat lift that could raise vessels out of the water, to be placed, via a turntable into one of twelve bays arranged in a circle. The boatlift and turntable was designed to lift a pelagic trawler and could accommodate vessels up to 65 metres in length, just adequate to raise and carry a Type VII U-boat.

However the trawler dock was in the open, and offered no protection from air raids, so work commenced on a series of enclosed pens protected by bomb-proof concrete roofs on the banks of the River Scorff, a branch of the Blavet, adjacent to the Lorient Arsenal(fr). Work commenced in November 1940, and the installation comprised two wet docks capable of accommodating the larger Type IX U-boat. At the same time, in the trawler port, two large above-ground bunkers were constructed to protect U-boats that may require repairs or refit. These structures were reminiscent of church naves, and were nicknamed "Dom" bunkers (Dom being the German word for a cathedral).

As work progressed on the Scorff pens, it became apparent the site was prone to silting, and would require constant dredging, while the soft ground was unable to take the weight of the structures, so plans were advanced for a new set of pens on the rocky Keroman peninsula, where the Etang de Kermeloe branches from the main estuary.

The first installation, designated K1, comprised a boat lift and rails to deliver the U-boats to one of 5 enclosed bays. Work commenced in February 1941 and was completed in September that year. A second set of protected bays, K2, were built opposite K1, completing in December 1941. While these were suitable for boats needing an extended stay the access was too complicated for boats needing a fast turnaround, and a third installation, K3, was built at sea level. This comprised 7 double side wet pens that U-boats could simply sail in and out of. All these structures had a substantial bomb-proof roof, though the rails delivering boats to K1 and K2 were left exposed. However Allied bombing strategy gave a low priority to these installations and they were not seriously attacked during the first 2 years of operation. Royal Canadian Air Force records show 427 Squadron conducted raids from base in Croft, directly attacking the harbor.

In the summer of 1943 work began on a fourth phase of construction, a set of 6 pens (designated KIVb) alongside K1 another six (KIVa) by K2. However little more than the foundations were completed.

The last part of the Lorient U-boat base was across the inlet at Kernevel, in Larmor-Plage. This was the Villa Kerlilon, which was used by Dönitz and his staff as a headquarters for the Atlantic campaign. The villa was equipped with a bomb-proof bunker in the grounds as protection from air-raids.

The base was capable of sheltering thirty submarines under cover. Although Lorient was heavily damaged by Allied bombing raids, this naval base survived through to the end of the war.

Since they could not destroy the base and its submarine pens, the Allies had decided to flatten the city and port of Lorient to cut the supply lines to the U-boat bases. Without resupply of fuel, weapons (e.g. torpedoes), and provisions, it became impossible for those U-boats to return to war patrols in the Atlantic Ocean. Between 14 January 1943 and 17 February 1943, Allied aircraft dropped as many as 500 high-explosive bombs and more than 60,000 incendiary bombs on Lorient; nearly 90% of the city was flattened.

Following the Normandy landings in June 1944, and subsequent breakout, Lorient was surrounded by the Allies on 12 August 1944. The remaining U-boats were evacuated, the last, U-853, escaping for Norway on 27 August. Lorient was held until May 1945 by the regular German army forces, though surrounded by the American Army; the Germans refused to surrender.

== Engineer Stosskopf submarine base ==
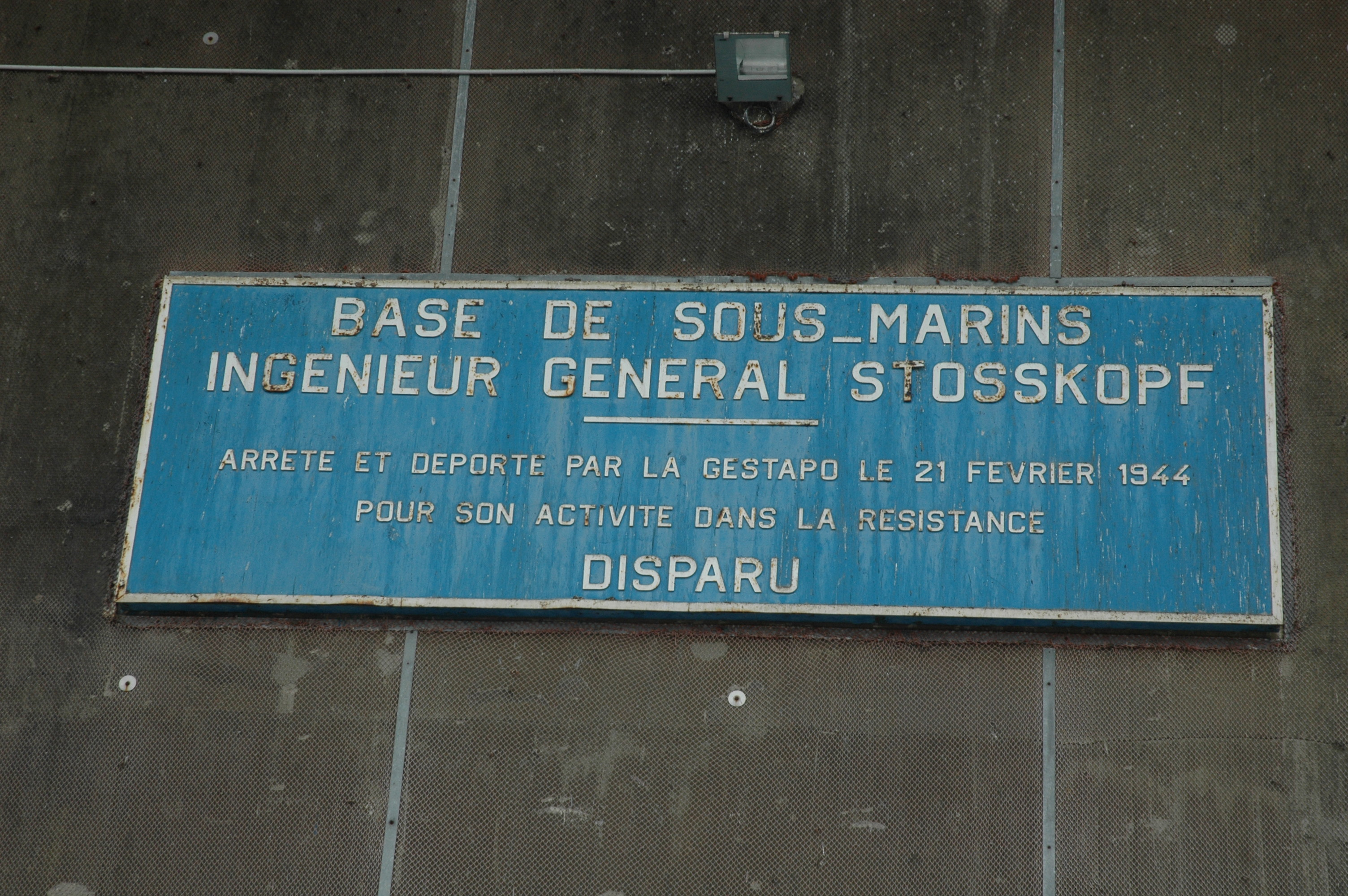
Commemorative plaque

Following the German surrender the installations were taken over by the French Navy for use as a submarine base. In July 1946 it was named by the French as Base Ingénieur Général Stosskopf commemorating Jacques Stosskopf, a hero of the French Resistance. Stosskopf was a German-speaking Alsatian Frenchman who had been the deputy director of naval construction at the base, and used this position to promote sabotage and to pass information on submarine movements to the Allies. His activities had been discovered and in September 1944 he was executed.

The base was in use until 1997, serving up to 10 submarines, and 2000 personnel. The base was also used for training, with the building of a 15-metre-high Submarine escape training facility and a hyperbaric chamber; also in the 1960s France’s nuclear submarine force trained there on the Gymnote. However the base lacked the facilities to handle nuclear submarines, and in the 1990s was scheduled to close.

== Keroman submarine museum ==
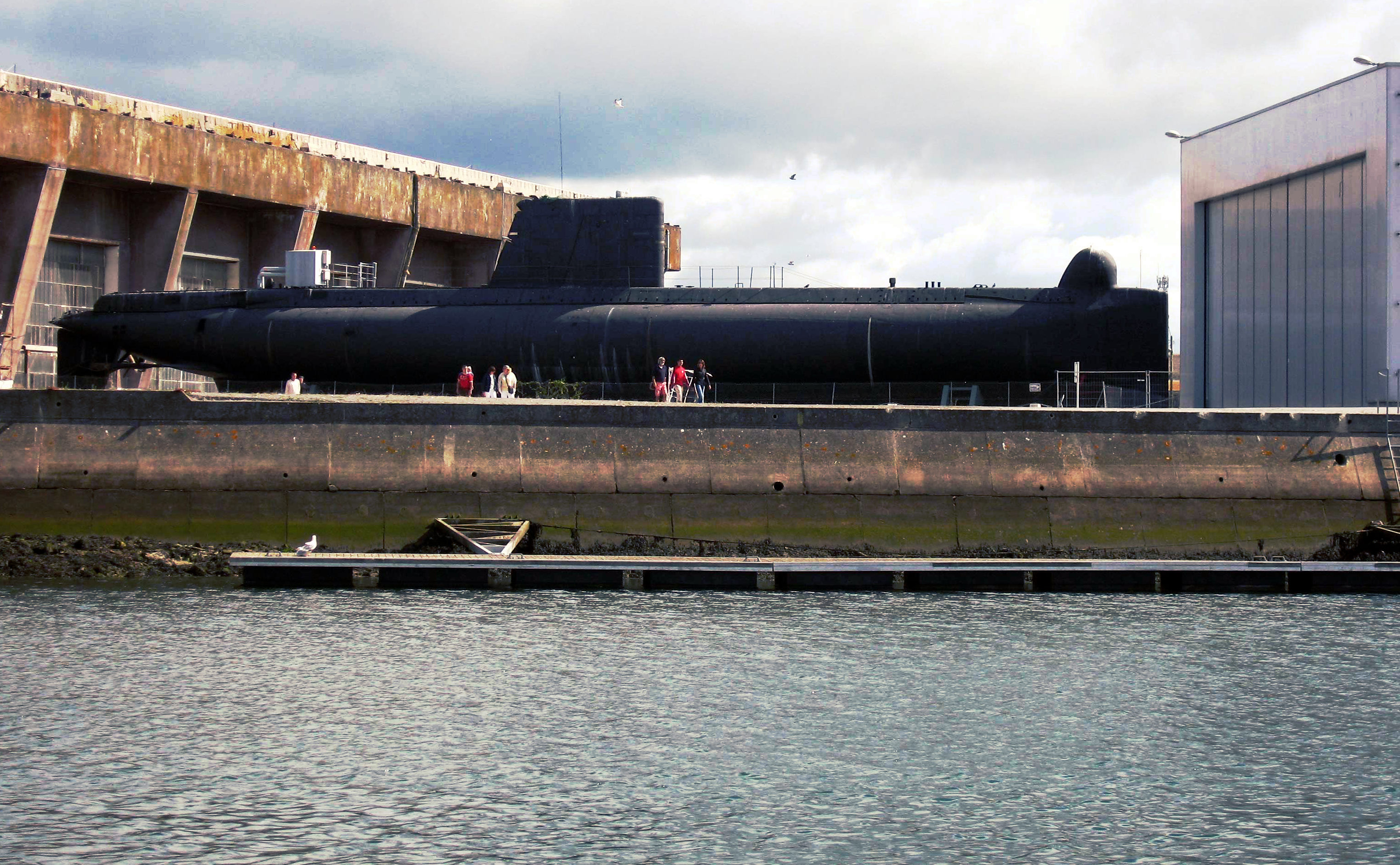
Daphné-class submarine Flore (S645)

After 1997 the site became available for civilian use, with the conversion of the pens into industrial units. One of the first companies to move in was Plastimo(fr), which manufactures marine instruments. It is also the site of the Keroman submarine museum, which is open to the public. The museum features the preserved submarine Flore, a Daphné-class submarine launched in 1961; a simulator, in the Davis tower; and tours of the K III bunker. During tours, the submarine pens of block K3 can be seen. Its roof (3.40 to 7.0 metres (11.15 to 22.97 ft) of steel-reinforced concrete) can be visited, as well as a former anti-aircraft tower on top of the U-boat base. The tower affords an excellent view of the harbour and of the former headquarters across the bay at Larmor-Plage. Another part of the base has been reconverted for industrial naval activities, with the preparation of racing multihulls. The site also the location of the City of Sailing exhibition centre(fr), named for yachtsman Eric Tabarly, and a yachting marina.

== See also ==
- Saint-Nazaire submarine base
- History of Lorient
- Fishing port of Lorient-Keroman

== Bibliography ==
- Clay Blair (1996) Hitler’s U-boat War : Vol I Cassell ISBN 0-304-35260-8
- Clay Blair (1998) Hitler’s U-boat War : Vol II Cassell ISBN 0-304-35261-6
- Jak Mallmann Showell (2007) Hitler’s U-boat Bases ISBN 978-0-7509-4555-4
