= Böhlen (oil tanker) =

East german oil tank that sank in 1976

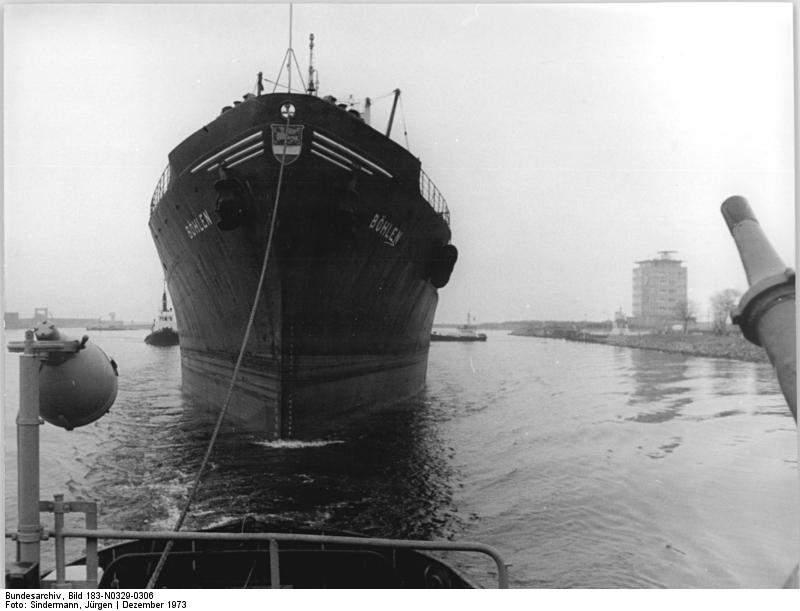
- The tanker Böhlen at the Port of Rostock, 1973

History
- Name: Böhlen
- Owner: Deutsche Seereederei
- Operator: Deutsche Seereederei
- Port of registry: East Germany, Rostock
- Builder: Admiralty Shipyard, Leningrad
- Completed: 1962
- Out of service: 1976
- Fate: Wrecked 14 October 1976

General characteristics
- Type: Oil tanker
- Installed power: Diesel engines, 2-stroke, 8-cylinder

Böhlen (or Boehlen in French reports and newspapers articles) was an East German oil tanker that sank during a storm off the Île de Sein on 14 October 1976, causing the death of 25 crew members and an oil slick on the coast of mainland Finistère and the Île de Sein. Three other people died in the operations to pump and clean up the oil from the Böhlen.

Launched at Leningrad in 1961, the Böhlen's sister ships were Port Briac and Port Maria, and she sailed under the East German flag. Her sinking came less than nine months after that of the Olympic Bravery, less than 40 km (25 mi) away, and marked the beginning of a series of similar disasters in Brittany, with those of the Amoco Cadiz in 1978, Gino in 1979, and Tanio in 1980.

== Shipwreck ==
On 14 October 1976, the Böhlen was en route from Maracaibo (Venezuela) to Rostock (East Germany) with a cargo of 9,800 tonnes of crude oil. The ship ran into a storm with winds gusting to 150 km/h (93 mph), causing a swell of 7 to 10 m (23 to 33 ft), and struck rocks below the surface.

At 5:33 p.m., the crew called for assistance, reporting heavy water ingress at 48° 10 N, 05° W. The crew quickly left the ship, but the lifeboats broke along the hull: 25 of the 36 crew members on board lost their lives, and the ship sank rapidly, even before help arrived.

At 7:30 p.m., two patrol aircraft spotted three lifeboats. At 10:50 pm, the Fort Ponchartrain, a cargo ship that had diverted, rescued three sailors from the first canoe. At 1:30 a.m. on 15 October 5 more people were rescued by the Pacific, a German tugboat. At 7:30 a.m., another person was rescued by a Super Frelon helicopter, and at 8:30 a.m., two others were rescued by Patience, a boat belonging to an Île de Sein resident. The shipwreck's heavy toll was partly due to poor communications: as the Île de Sein fishermen had not been warned of the sinking, they intervened only when they saw an empty rowboat adrift. Seven Senan fishing boats brought two survivors and the bodies of eight people - two women and six men - to the island. "We'd seen oiled birds before, but not yet human beings..." declared a Sena sailor in the local newspaper Mouez Enez Sun.

The wreck of the Böhlen is located at coordinates 48° 11 N, 05° 11 W, some 30 km (19 mi) west northwest of the Île de Sein. Many sources put the date of the sinking as 15 October, when the oil reached the coast, but the wreck appears to have occurred on 14 October 1976.

== Oil spill ==
Location of the wreck of Böhlen, not far from the site of the shipwreck.

The extent of the oil spill is difficult to estimate. Some 2,000 tons of oil were collected by hand from the shoreline, while several thousand more were dispersed in the ocean.

=== Progression of the oil slicks ===
At 8:30 a.m. on 15 October, the first oil slicks reached the Île de Sein. The pollution then reached the coasts of Cap Sizun, the Bay of Douarnenez, and the Bay of Audierne, and spread, to a lesser extent, from Porstall in the north to the tip of Penmarch in the south, and more noticeably to Crozon and Le Conquet, thus affecting the entire western side of the Finistère department.

Three days after the shipwreck, Alain Leroy, mayor of the Île de Sein, spoke out in the newspaper Ouest-France against the use of dispersants deemed harmful.

In addition to the fuel oil released directly when the ship sank, the wreck seemed to release oil continuously over the following weeks, and the pollution spread over time despite efforts to remove it. On 14 November 1976 (one month after the wreck), divers from the vessel Le Pélican estimated that oil was leaking from the wreck at a rate of 10 tons a day.

=== Ecosystem damage ===
The damage to the marine ecosystem of Finistère was considerable. In October 1976, a care center for oiled birds was opened in Brest. It took in razorbills, common guillemots, gannets, gulls, etc. 268 birds were taken in between October 1976 and June 1977, 74% of them alcids. The curve of bird arrivals at the care center shows a sharp peak in the month following the sinking of Böhlen, then a plateau until June 1977, corresponding to the release of oil into the ocean, which was continuous until that date. In April 1977, 30 puffins were found dead on the Blancs-Sablons beach in Le Conquet. No overall count of birds found dead has been undertaken. In proportion to the quantity of oil released, the loss of birdlife caused by the sinking of Böhlen was greater than that of Amoco Cadiz.

The rest of the marine fauna was also heavily impacted. Crustaceans such as crabs and lobsters, fish, and flora are vulnerable to oil. Photosynthesis becomes impossible due to the impact of oil on algae, which withers, leaving the seawater lacking oxygen for other organisms.

=== Pumping operations ===
The decision was taken to seal several breaches in the wreck's hull. Under pressure from fishermen and the tourist trade, it was decided to pump out the oil still in the tanks, using the specialized drilling vessel Pétrel, operated by Comex. The novel solution involved sucking out the oil after injecting seawater at 90 °C (194 °F) into the tanks, to increase fluidity. Operations began in May 1977 and were completed by the end of August 1977. The location of the wreck at a depth of 106 m (348 ft) and weather conditions complicated the project. Two divers died during the pumping operations, which removed 2,500 tons of oil from the wreck's tanks, out of the 9,800 tons contained before the sinking. The pumped oil was burnt directly on the ship Pétrel, causing atmospheric pollution. The cost of plugging and pumping operations is estimated at 143 million francs: 43 million for plugging and 100 million for pumping. The remainder of the pollution costs (clean-up, compensation for fishermen) is covered half by the French Navy, and half by the ship's insurance.

=== Waste collection and treatment ===
On 30 April 1977, 40 tons of oil collected on the shores of the Île de Sein were buried south of Quimper, at a place called Toulven, polluting the groundwater used by local farmers. The oil was then dug up and burned. On 2 May 1977, 120 tons of oil were spilled in former blockhouses in Plogoff, near Pointe du Raz.

On the Crozon peninsula, 85 m³ of Böhlen oil are stored in Morgat, 25 m^{3} (880 cu ft) in Portzic, 15 m^{3} (530 cu ft) in Postolonnec, as well as at the Kerloc'h landfill in Camaret-sur-Mer.

== See also ==
- List of oil spills
