= French frigate Isère =

French Navy transport frigate

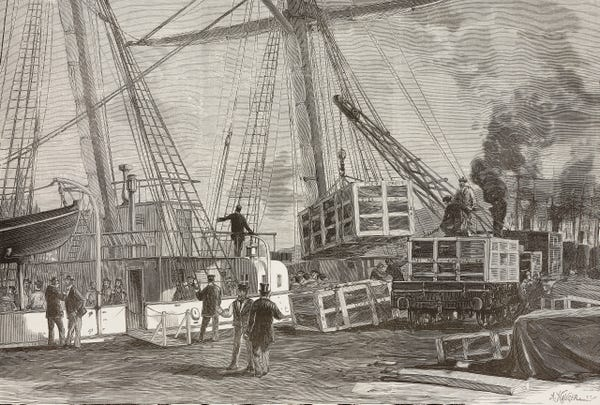
- The Statue of Liberty being loaded onto Isère at Rouen, France in 1885

History

France
- Name: Isère
- Launched: 25 April 1866
- Decommissioned: 1911
- Out of service: 1943
- Stricken: December 1909
- Fate: Scuttled

General characteristics
- Propulsion: Sails, propellers
- Complement: 69 (Including 5 officers)

Isère was a French Navy transport frigate that shipped The Statue of Liberty from France to the United States in 1885.

== History ==
The construction of Isère began in Lorient, France on July 1st, 1863. The ship was then launched on the 25th of April, 1866 for testing. Isère entered naval service from 1868-1884, fulfilling standard duties as a transport vehicle.

=== Transport of the Statue of Liberty ===
In 1884 the Statue of Liberty was disassembled into 350 pieces and put in 210 crates, all loaded on Isère. The ship set sail to New York Harbor on May 21, 1885 led by Gabriel Lespinasse de Saune, arriving June 17, 1885.

=== Affairs After ===
Isère was disarmed December of 1909 and taken out of service in 1911. On April 29, 1924 she was repurposed as a pontoon.

1940-1943, when Lorient was captured by Germans during World War 2 Isère was badly damaged during a bombing and was scuttled and scrapped for materials.

== Gallery ==
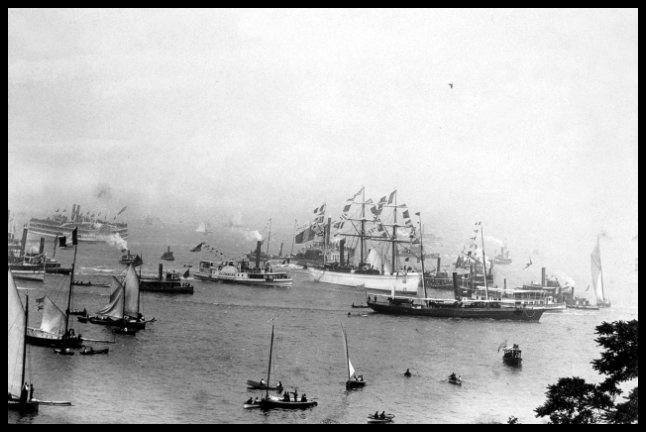
The Statue of Liberty arrives in New York Harbor, on board the French frigate Isère 1885

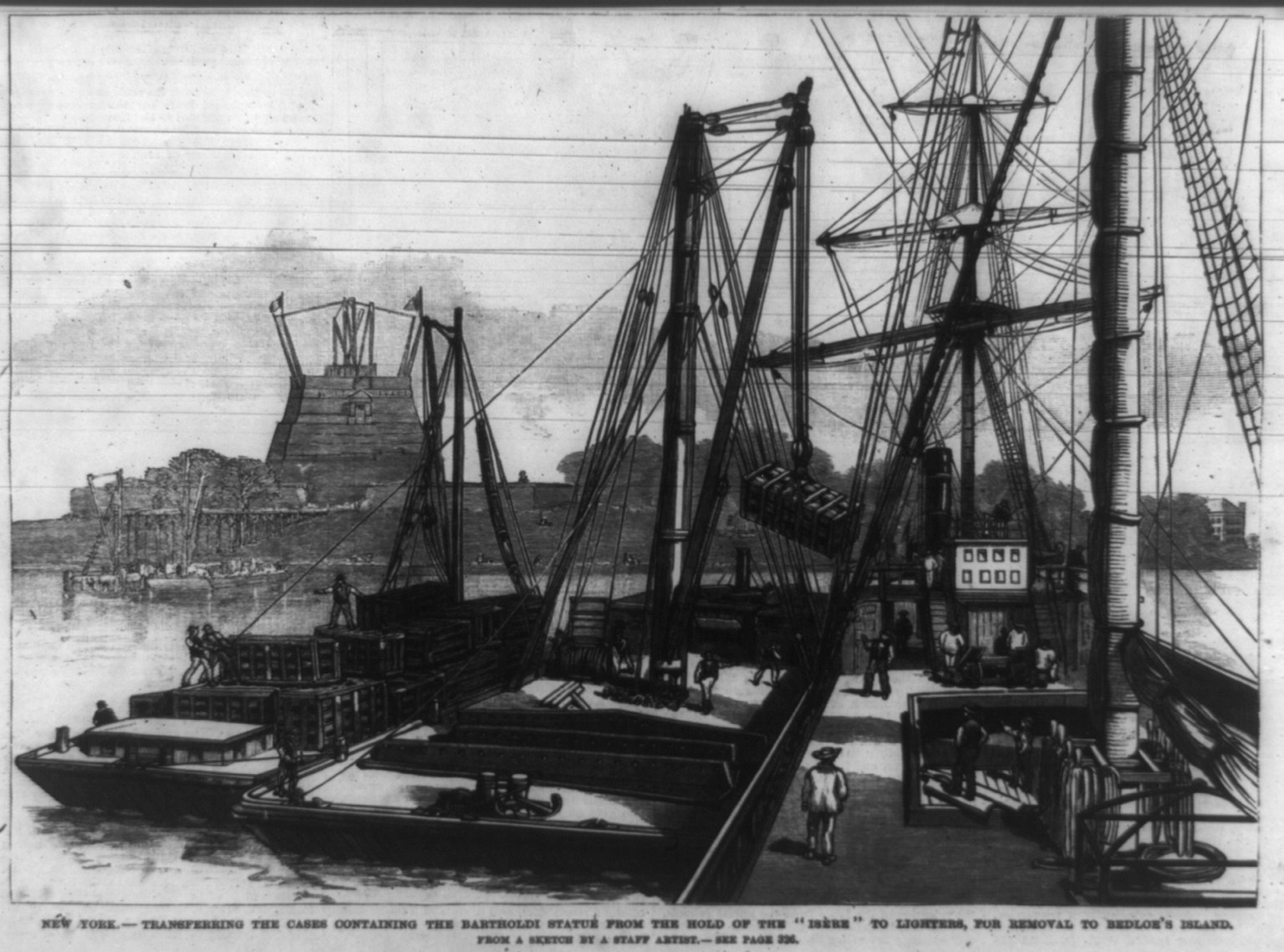
New York - Transferring the cases containing the Bartholdi statue from the hold of Isère to lighters, for removal to Bedloe's Island

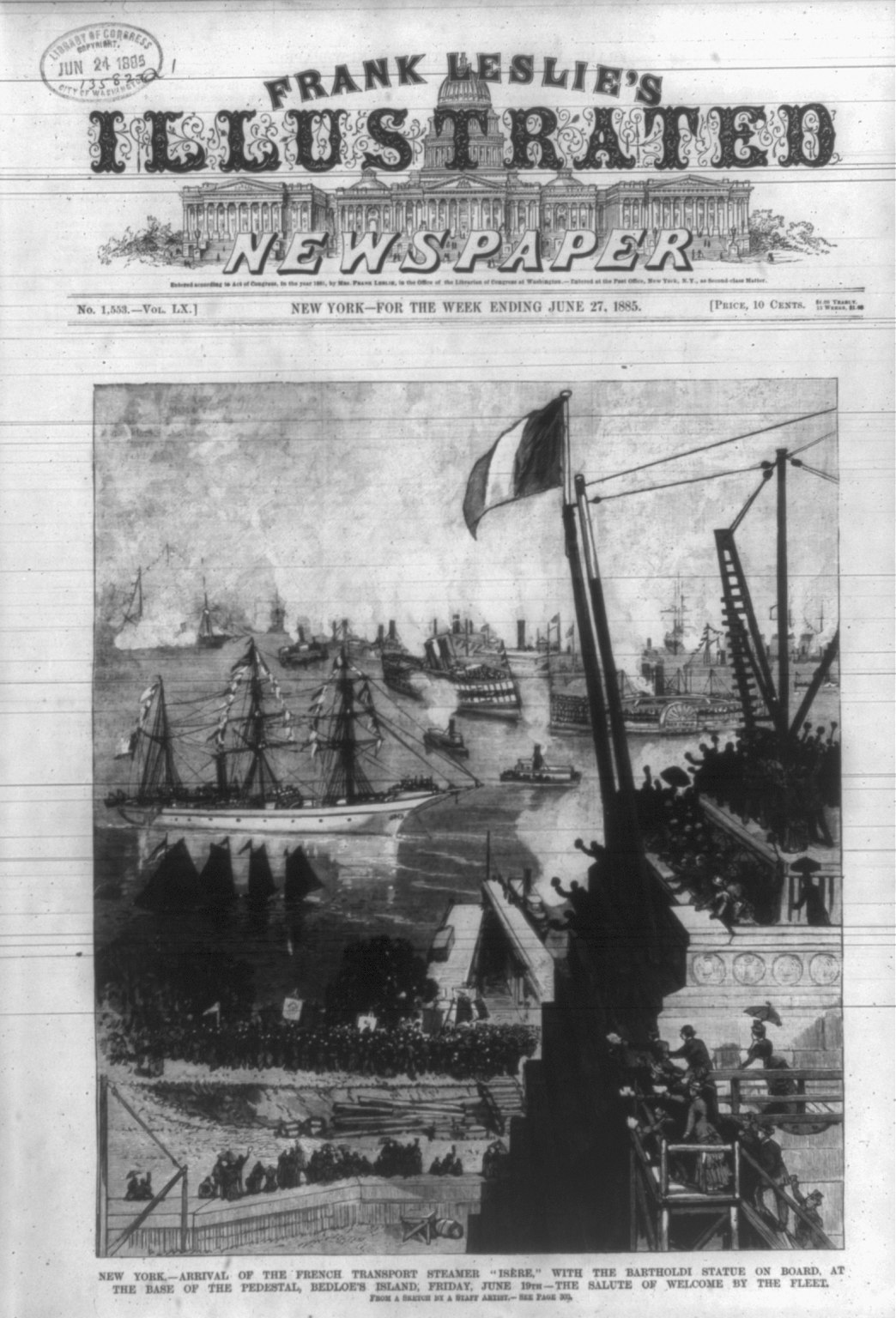
New York - arrival of the French transport steamer Isère with the Bartholdi statue on board, at the base of the pedestal, Bedloe's Island, June 19
