= Tanio oil spill =

- Interactive map of Tanio oil spill
- Location: English Channel, Breton Coast
- Date: 7 March 1980

Cause
- Cause: Violent weather split Tanio in two

Spill characteristics
- Volume: 13,400 tons
- Shoreline impacted: 198 km (123 mi)

The Tanio oil spill occurred on 7 March 1980 when the Tanio, an oil tanker of Madagascan origin traveling from Wilhelmshaven to Civitavecchia, split in two 60 kilometres (37 mi) off the coast of Brittany, France, in rough weather, spilling about 13,500 tons of cargo oil into the English Channel and killing eight sailors. The stern section of the ship was towed to Le Havre by a British cargo ship despite the strong wind. The bow, however, sunk, leaking 5,000 tons of oil. After the spill, strong winds moved the oil toward the Breton coast.

== Cleanup operations ==
Oil began to wash a shore on the Breton beaches on 9 March and contaminated about 200 kilometres (120 mi) of the coastline, overlapping 45% of the area that have been contaminated by the Amoco Cadiz oil spill in 1978. In contrast to the Amoco Cadiz spill, in which only one quarter of lost oil washed ashore, most of the spilled oil came onshore due to weather conditions. Because tourism is an important industry in Brittany, measures were quickly taken to clean up the spilled oil. This proved difficult because the contamination was mainly heavy fuel oil (n° 6) and therefore, extremely viscous, especially in cold, cloudy weather, which limited the use of tractor drawn vacuum trucks in cleaning up the beaches. Additionally, the large tidal range (9 m, 30 ft), severe weather, and the varied coastline prevented the effective use of booms. Ultimately, bulldozers and other heavy-machinery were used to remove oil from beaches.

== Response ==
After the initial event, the Prefecture Maritime of the Atlantic organized procedures with the French Navy's Operation Centre. Distress calls were quickly answered, and a French Navy helicopter rescued 31 sailors.

In the two departments where the oil was spilled, the Department of Finistère and the Department of Cotes-du-Nord, now known as Côtes-d'Armor implemented Plan Polmar, the French national oil spill response plan, was implemented. Thus, national army personnel played a role in the cleanup. Furthermore, The International Tanker Owners Pollution Federation (ITOPF) advised and monitored the situation for the International Oil Pollution Compensation (IOPC) Fund. All together, damage and cleanup costs were over $50 million.

== Effects ==
The oil spilled from Tanio was of low toxicity; thus, environmental effects were somewhat mitigated. Nevertheless, about 1,700 dead birds were found, oyster beds were contaminated, and the seaweed harvest was disrupted. Further contamination was mainly due to a speedy and thorough cleanup process. Within two months of the disaster, cleanup had switched removing oil with skimmers and pumps to the use of high-pressure hoses in rocky areas. In addition, cleanup was not restricted to tourist areas and collection areas, but also included efforts to clean removed or isolated areas, as well as locations where a relatively quick natural cleanup could be expected.
