= Larmor-Plage =

Commune in Brittany, France

Larmor-Plage An Arvor
- Commune
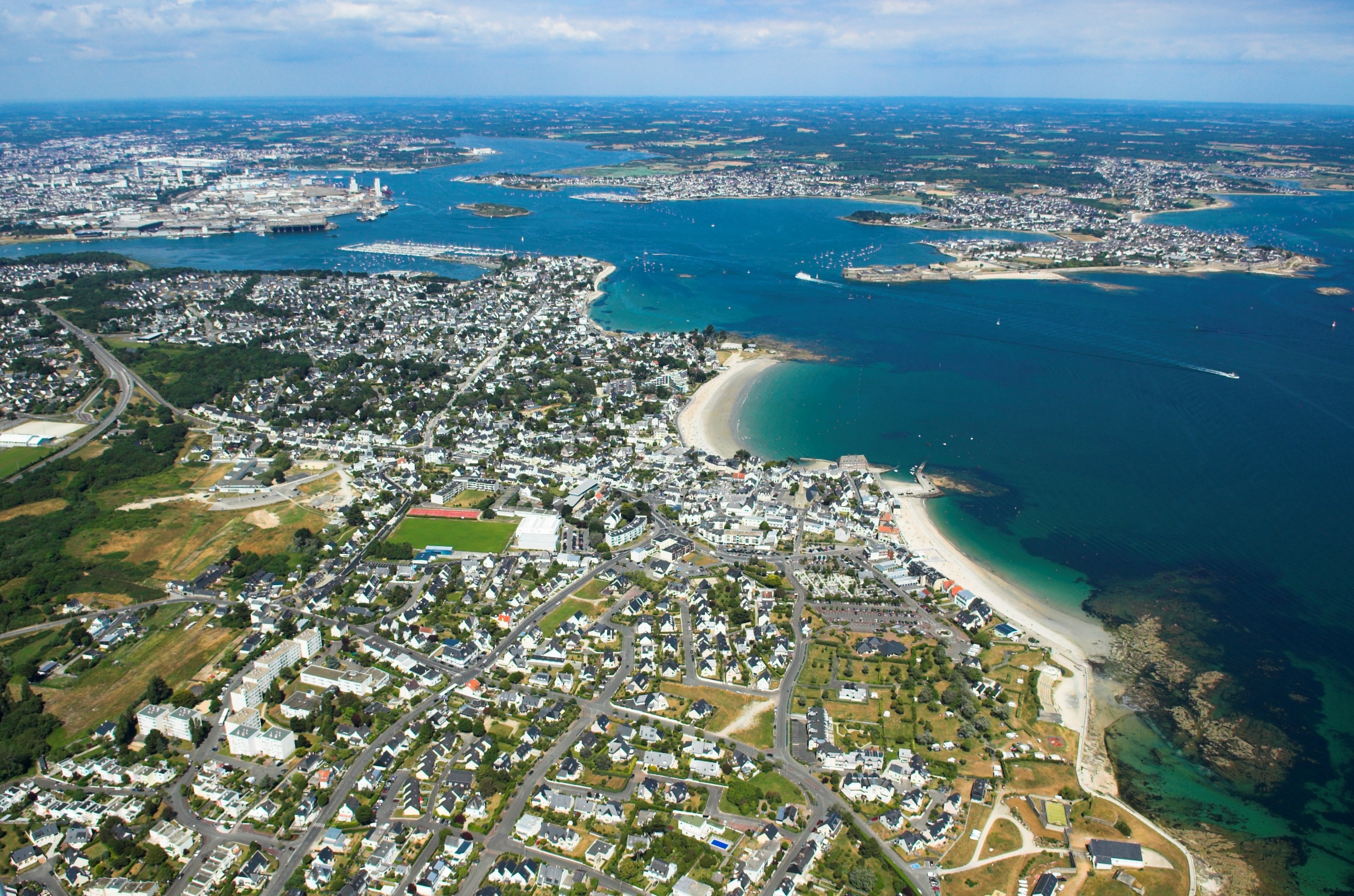
- Larmor-Plage and the Blavet river

- Coat of arms
- Location of Larmor-Plage
- Location within France Location within Brittany
- Coordinates: 47°42′26″N 3°22′59″W
- Country: France
- Region: Brittany
- Department: Morbihan
- Arrondissement: Lorient
- Canton: Ploemeur
- Intercommunality: Lorient Agglomération

Government
  - Mayor (2026–32): Marianne Rousset
- Area^{1}: 7.27 km^{2} (2.81 sq mi)
- Highest elevation: 39 m (128 ft)
- Lowest elevation: 0 m (0 ft)
- Population (2023): 8,418
  - Density: 1,160/km^{2} (3,000/sq mi)
- Time zone: UTC+01:00 (CET)
  - Summer (DST): UTC+02:00 (CEST)
- INSEE/Postal code: 56107 /56260
- ^{1} French Land Register data, which excludes lakes, ponds, glaciers > 1 km^{2} (0.386 sq mi or 247 acres) and river estuaries.

Larmor-Plage (French pronunciation: [laʁmɔʁ plaʒ]; Breton: An Arvor) is a commune in the Morbihan department of Brittany in north-western France.

== History ==
Larmor-Plage was created as a new commune in 1925. Before that, it came within the administrative area of the town of Ploemeur. It was almost completely destroyed in World War II.

Larmor-Plage is twinned with the town of Youghal in County Cork, Ireland.

== Population ==
Historical population
Year	Pop.	±% p.a.
1968	5,877	—
1975	5,389	−1.23%
1982	6,373	+2.42%
1990	8,078	+3.01%
1999	8,470	+0.53%
2007	8,415	−0.08%
2012	8,219	−0.47%
2017	8,299	+0.19%
2023	8,418	+0.24%
Source: INSEE

== Sights ==
The church Notre-Dame-de-Larmor is located in the centre of the town. It was built in the fifteenth century.

== Environment ==
Kerguelen is a natural park.

== Sports ==
Windsurfing is an important activity. The nautical centre of Kerguelen is the first school of sailing in France.

== See also ==
- Communes of the Morbihan department
