= Disappearance of Danielle Judic =

1978 missing person case in France

Danielle Judic
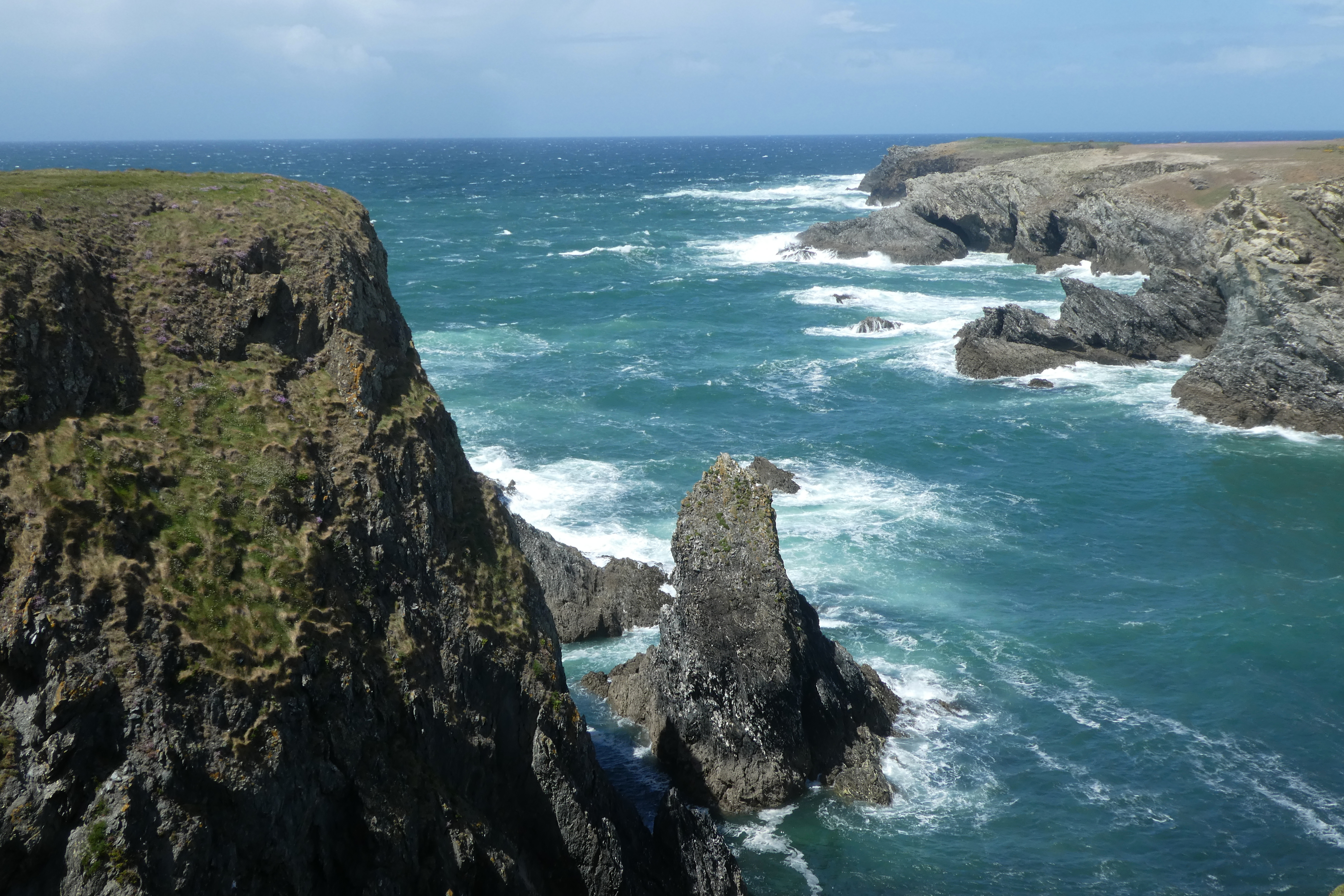
- Cliffs at Port Coton
- Disappeared: 31 December 1978; Belle-Île-en-Mer
- Status: Missing for 47 years, 3 months and 3 days

The disappearance of Danielle Judic is an unsolved legal case in France. On 31 December 1978, the 26-year-old pharmacist from Belle-Île-en-Mer, Danielle Judic, attended a New Year's Eve party, which she left by car at around 10 p.m. The next day, she was nowhere to be found. The police investigation that followed failed to determine the causes of her disappearance, and various hypotheses have been put forward. As of 2025, the case remains unsolved.

== Events ==
Danielle Judic was a 25-year-old pharmacist. who has lived since 1976 in Le Palais, the largest town on Belle-Île-en-Mer, an island in Morbihan off the coast of Brittany. On 31 December 1978, she attended a New Year's Eve party at the home of one of the doctors at the island's hospital, where many members of the medical staff were present. Around 10 p.m., a couple saw her leaving the house, visibly angry. She reportedly had an argument with one of her lovers who was present at the party, who threatened her with a knife. She took her car, and witnesses saw her return home (probably to change: her evening dress was found by her cleaning lady on January 3). She then set off again by car on the road to Bangor, and turned off towards Port-Coton, towards the Gouphar cliffs, a place where the road winds near steep cliffs.

In the following three days, a storm hit the island. On 2 January, Danielle Judic was reported missing and the first searches began.

== Hypotheses ==
The first hypothesis considered was that of a car accident as due to driving at night on a dangerous road, Judic could have fallen off the cliffs into the sea. However, no remains of the car or traces of skidding were ever found. The searches carried out by divers yielded no results. Some people mentioned her plan to go on a trip to Mexico or Australia . However, as her name did not appear in the registers of the boats that left the island to reach the continent, this possibility was ruled out.

The Brigade des stupéfiants was in charge of the case at the request of the prosecutor. Danielle Judic may have participated in a drug trafficking operation. Her lover Cornu was suspected of having murdered her. However, Cornu died by suicide in prison six months later while he was incarcerated in connection with drug trafficking.

In 1990, the legal proceedings ended with a dismissal.

In 2010, a skeleton found on a beach suggested that it could be his; but analysis showed that it was an individual who had died a hundred years earlier.

In 2015, a new hypothesis was put forward: the car could have fallen into a sinkhole which was then filled in. That same year, the family asked Member of Parliament (MP) Yves Daniel for access to the investigation file.

In 2024, the investigation was entrusted to the association Assistance and Search for Missing Persons (ARPD).

== Popular culture ==
The disappearance of Danielle Judic was adapted into a novel by Christophe Ferré in October 2023.

== See also ==
- List of people who disappeared mysteriously: 1910–1990
- List of major crimes in France (1900–present)
