= Bangor, Morbihan =

Bangor
- Commune
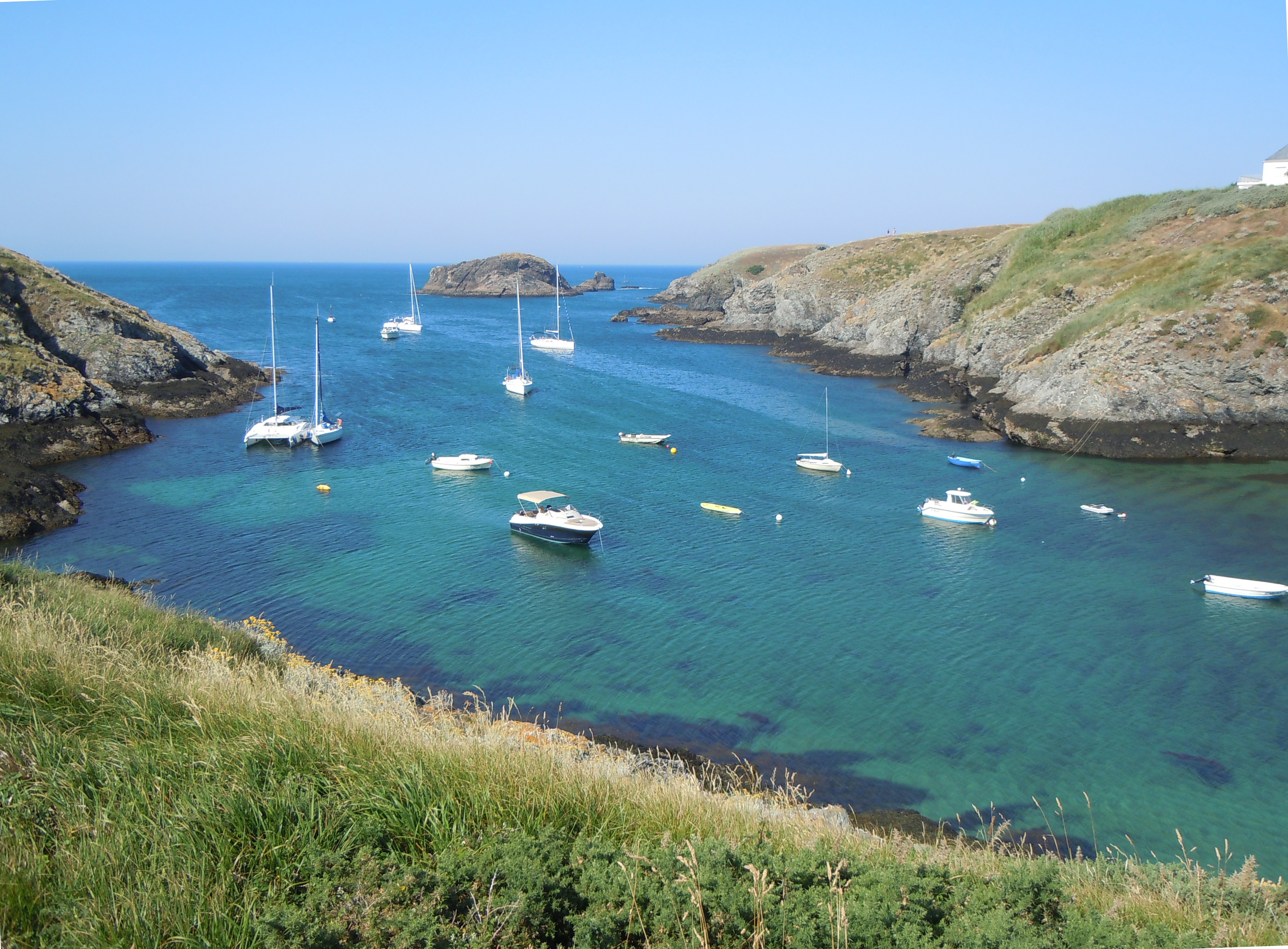
- Port Goulphar
- Location of Bangor
- Location within France Location within Brittany
- Coordinates: 47°18′57″N 3°11′14″W
- Country: France
- Region: Brittany
- Department: Morbihan
- Arrondissement: Lorient
- Canton: Quiberon
- Intercommunality: Belle-Île-en-Mer

Government
  - Mayor (2026–32): Annaïck Huchet
- Area^{1}: 25.54 km^{2} (9.86 sq mi)
- Elevation: 44 m (144 ft)
- Highest elevation: 58 m (190 ft)
- Lowest elevation: 0 m (0 ft)
- Population (2023): 994
  - Density: 38.9/km^{2} (101/sq mi)
- Demonym: Bangorins
- Time zone: UTC+01:00 (CET)
  - Summer (DST): UTC+02:00 (CEST)
- INSEE/Postal code: 56009 /56360
- ^{1} French Land Register data, which excludes lakes, ponds, glaciers > 1 km^{2} (0.386 sq mi or 247 acres) and river estuaries.

Bangor (French pronunciation: [bɑ̃ɡɔʁ]) is a commune in the Morbihan department in the Brittany region of north-western France. It is one of the four communes on the island of Belle-Île.

== Geography ==
Bangor is one of four communes on the island of Belle Île located on the south-west coast of the island. The island is some 14 km south of the Quiberon peninsula. Access to the commune is by the D190 road from Le Palais in the north and the D25 from Locmaria in the east which continues to Sauzon in the north-west. There is the small Aerodrome de Belle-Île in the north of the commune which hosts the Aeroclub de Belle-Ile en Mer. Apart from the village there are many hamlets in the commune:

- Bordenec'h
- Bornor
- Borsauz
- Calestren
- Cosquet
- Domois
- Donnant
- Goélan
- Le Grand Village
- Kerguélen
- Kerourdé
- Kervarijon
- Parlavan
- Radenac
- Tinéüé
- Le Vazen

Several offshore islands also belong to the commune as well as other unnamed islets:

- Ile de Bangor
- Roches de Bornor
- Iles de Domois
- Iles de Baguenères
- Aiguilles Rocheuses

The commune consists almost entirely of farmland.

=== Climate ===
The commune is exposed to strong winds.

Comparison of local Meteorological data with other cities in France
Town	Sunshine (hours/yr)	Rain (mm/yr)	Snow (days/yr)	Storm (days/yr)	Fog (days/yr)
National average	1,973	770	14	22	40
Bangor	-	712	1	6	26
Paris	1,661	637	12	18	10
Nice	2,724	767	1	29	1
Strasbourg	1,693	665	29	29	56
Brest	1,605	1,211	7	12	75

Climate data for Belle-Ile
Month	Jan	Feb	Mar	Apr	May	Jun	Jul	Aug	Sep	Oct	Nov	Dec	Year
Mean daily maximum °C (°F)	9.7 (49.5)	9.5 (49.1)	11.4 (52.5)	13.5 (56.3)	16.5 (61.7)	19.2 (66.6)	21.1 (70.0)	21.4 (70.5)	19.7 (67.5)	16.4 (61.5)	12.9 (55.2)	10.5 (50.9)	15.2 (59.4)
Daily mean °C (°F)	7.9 (46.2)	7.5 (45.5)	9.2 (48.6)	10.8 (51.4)	13.7 (56.7)	16.2 (61.2)	18.2 (64.8)	18.4 (65.1)	16.8 (62.2)	14.2 (57.6)	10.9 (51.6)	8.6 (47.5)	12.7 (54.9)
Mean daily minimum °C (°F)	6.0 (42.8)	5.4 (41.7)	6.9 (44.4)	8.0 (46.4)	10.9 (51.6)	13.2 (55.8)	15.2 (59.4)	15.3 (59.5)	13.9 (57.0)	12.0 (53.6)	8.9 (48.0)	6.6 (43.9)	10.2 (50.4)
Average precipitation mm (inches)	80.7 (3.18)	63.3 (2.49)	56.6 (2.23)	45.4 (1.79)	60.8 (2.39)	32.5 (1.28)	38.5 (1.52)	36.2 (1.43)	60.8 (2.39)	86.9 (3.42)	66.9 (2.63)	82.9 (3.26)	711.5 (28.01)
Average precipitation days (≥ 1 mm)	13.3	9.4	10.4	8.6	9.1	6.6	6.5	6.0	7.9	12.0	12.2	13.6	115.6
Source: Meteorological data for Belle-Ile – 37 m altitude, from 1981 to 2010 January 2015 (in French)

=== Map ===
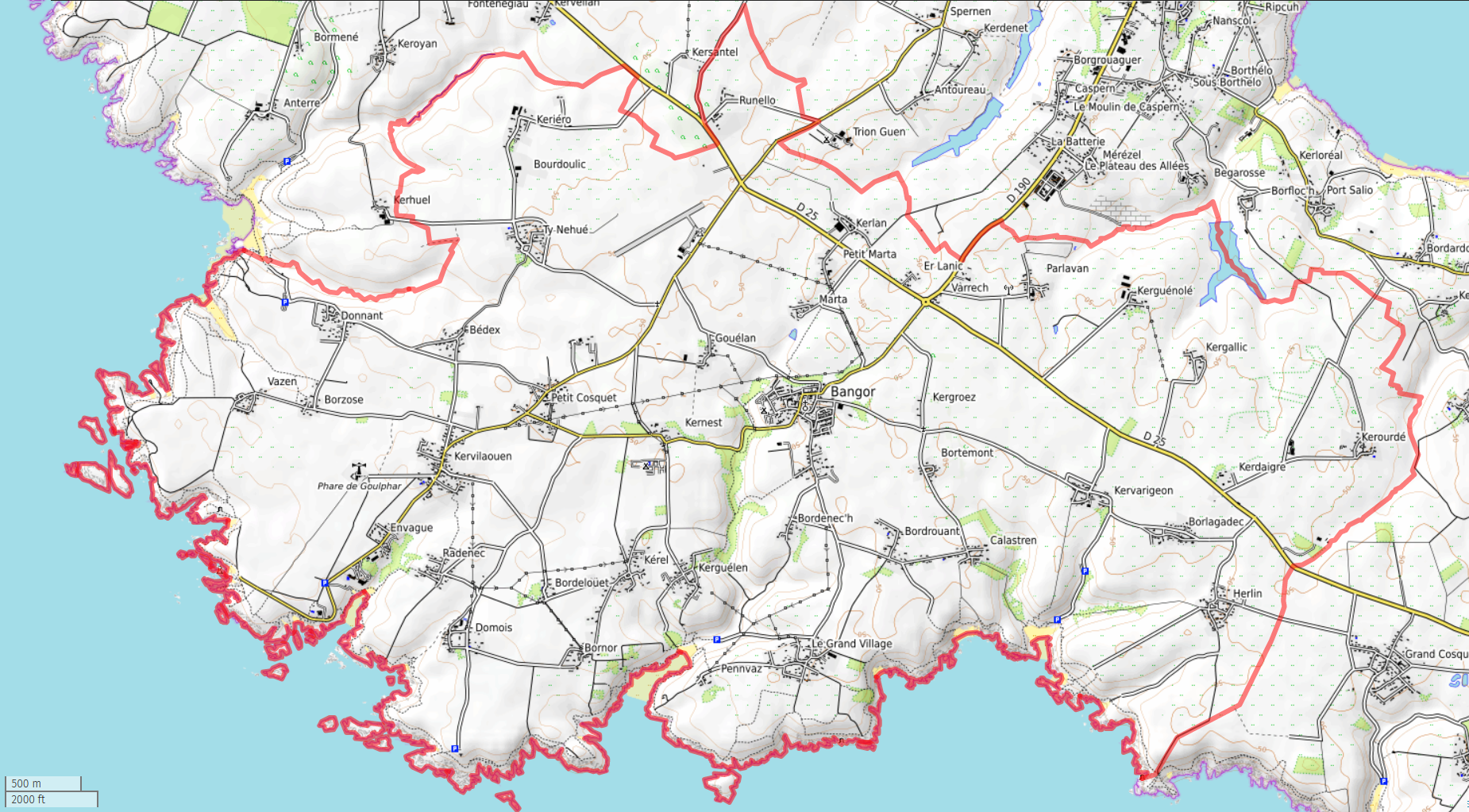
Topographic map

== Toponymy ==
It is not known if the name comes from Bangor Abbey in Northern Ireland, one of the most famous abbeys in Western Christianity, from where it is known that monks like Columbanus came to evangelize in Armorica in the 6th century, or from the Monastery of Bangor-Fawr, founded in Wales around 545 on the Menai Strait.

The Breton name of the commune is Bangor.

== History ==
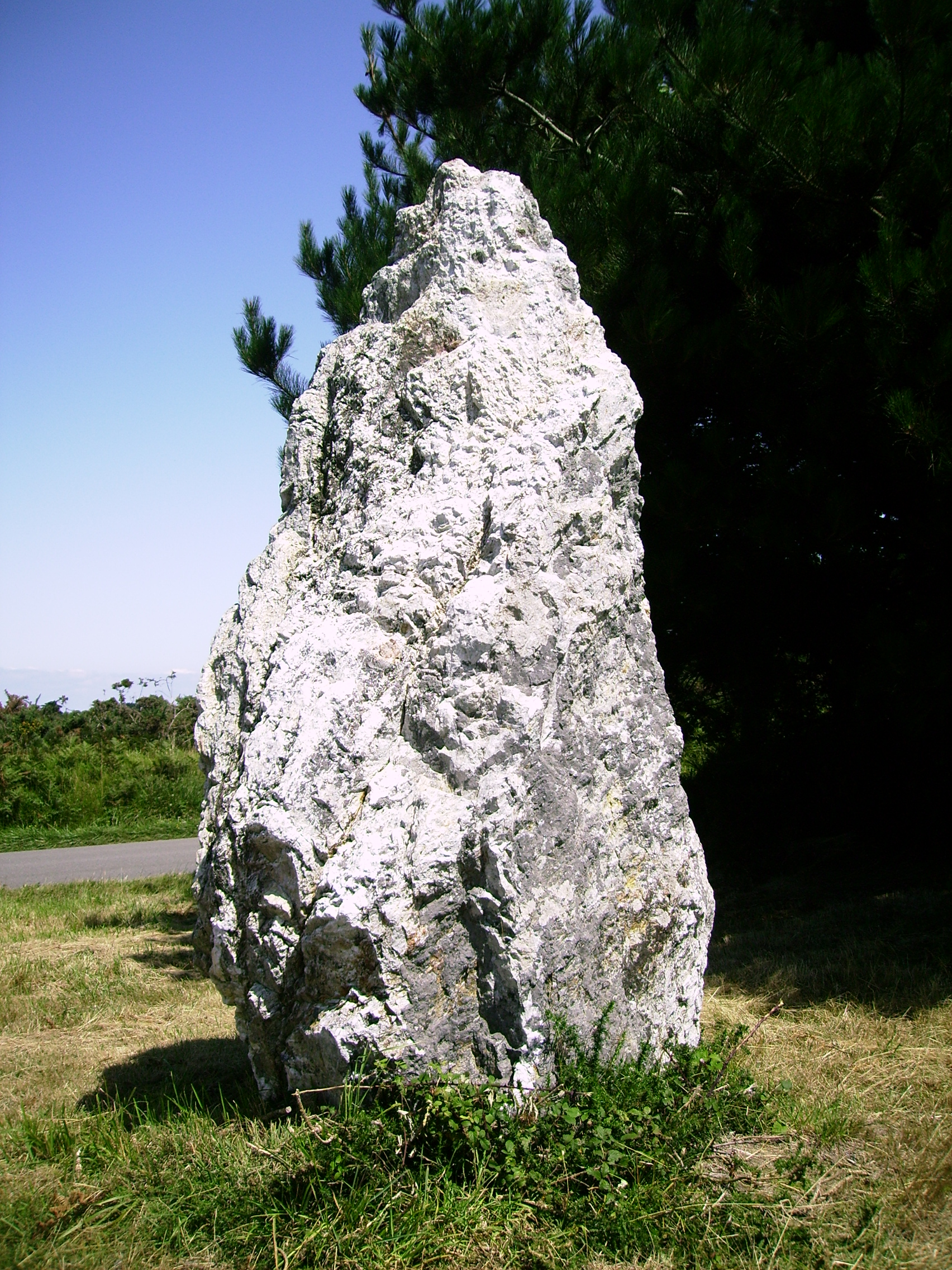
The Pierre Sainte Anne menhir

The commune of Bangor has been inhabited since prehistory as evidenced by the Pierre Sainte Anne menhir.

Bangor has been the administrative centre of the island for 10 centuries. It was the name of a priory founded by Benedictine monks who came to colonize and populate the island starting in the 7th century.

Colonization consisted of dividing the island into five parishes with Bangor occupying the middle Each parish was a small area given to residual families from the island or to colonists who were asked by the monks to come to Brittany.

In the 9th century the island was devastated by the Vikings and the priory was placed under the secular protection of the Counts of Cornouaille (in Armorican Brittany). In 1029 the Count of Cornouaille Alain Canhiart entrusted the island to the recently founded Sainte-Croix de Quimperlé Abbey. As it was directly under the authority of the Pope, Belle-Ile benefited from immunity from being under the authority of both the bishopric of Vannes and the duchy of Brittany. The administration of the island was delegated to a provost of the abbey who had temporal power (the right of low, middle, and high justice which was performed sometimes at Belle-Ile and sometimes at Quimperlé). From 1408 the right was exercised only at Quimperlé.

The Count of Cornouaille entrusted the island to the Benedictines of Redon Abbey who were able to take possession of it after long protests from the abbot of Quimperlé. The priory remained in the same spot as its predecessors (on the current location of the municipal campground of Bangor) and a fort was constructed at Le Palais which later became the capital of the island instead of Bangor.

Belle-Île was governed by monks until the 16th century when incessant attacks by pirates forced them to relinquish their fiefdom to the king, or rather to the regent Catherine de' Medici, who gave the land in vassalage to the Gondi family – then owners of the Pays de Retz. The land, however, remained under the heavy hand of the regime until the French Revolution.

The Goulphar Lighthouse on the west coast of Bangor has been active since 1836.

The semaphore of Talut was put into service in 1862.

== Administration ==
List of Successive Mayors

Mayors from the French Revolution to 1935

From	To	Name
1791	1797	Pierre Paul Sechant
1797	1799	Le Matelot
1799	1809	Pierre Paul Sechant
1809	1810	Jean Martin Labado
1810	1818	Jean Jacques Hippolyte Le Dru
1818	1839	Pierre Vincent Le Matelot
1839	1844	Le Dru
1844	1852	G. Sechant
1852	1874	Jean Patern Briere
1874	1876	Louis Marie Laleous
1876	1896	Mathurin L'Hermite
1896	1900	Pierre Marie L'Hermite
1900	1919	François Marie Le Bihan
1919	1925	Onésime Bénoni L'Hermite
1925	1935	Herve

Mayors from 1935

From	To	Name
1935	1946	François Le Marec
1946	1960	Jean Marie Le Bihan
1960	1971	Paul Bedex
1971	1977	Adolphe Olieric
1977	1983	Paul Meunier
1983	1989	Jean Yves Daniel
1989	2001	Lucien Maho
2001	2014	Pierre-Yves Desard
2014	2026	Annaïck Huchet

== Demography ==
The inhabitants of Bangor are called Bangorins in French.

Historical population

Year	Pop.	±% p.a.
1793	1,218	—
1800	1,183	−0.42%
1806	1,005	−2.68%
1821	1,418	+2.32%
1831	1,638	+1.45%
1836	1,762	+1.47%
1841	1,742	−0.23%
1846	1,712	−0.35%
1851	1,820	+1.23%
1856	1,813	−0.08%
1861	1,801	−0.13%
1866	1,868	+0.73%
1872	1,862	−0.05%
1876	1,807	−0.75%
1881	1,665	−1.62%
1886	1,615	−0.61%
1891	1,565	−0.63%
1896	1,541	−0.31%
1901	1,454	−1.16%

Year	Pop.	±% p.a.
1906	1,484	+0.41%
1911	1,342	−1.99%
1921	1,074	−2.20%
1926	1,017	−1.08%
1931	988	−0.58%
1936	929	−1.22%
1946	809	−1.37%
1954	670	−2.33%
1962	578	−1.83%
1968	550	−0.82%
1975	563	+0.33%
1982	637	+1.78%
1990	735	+1.80%
1999	738	+0.05%
2007	894	+2.43%
2012	946	+1.14%
2017	999	+1.10%
2023	994	−0.08%

Source: EHESS and INSEE

== Culture and heritage ==
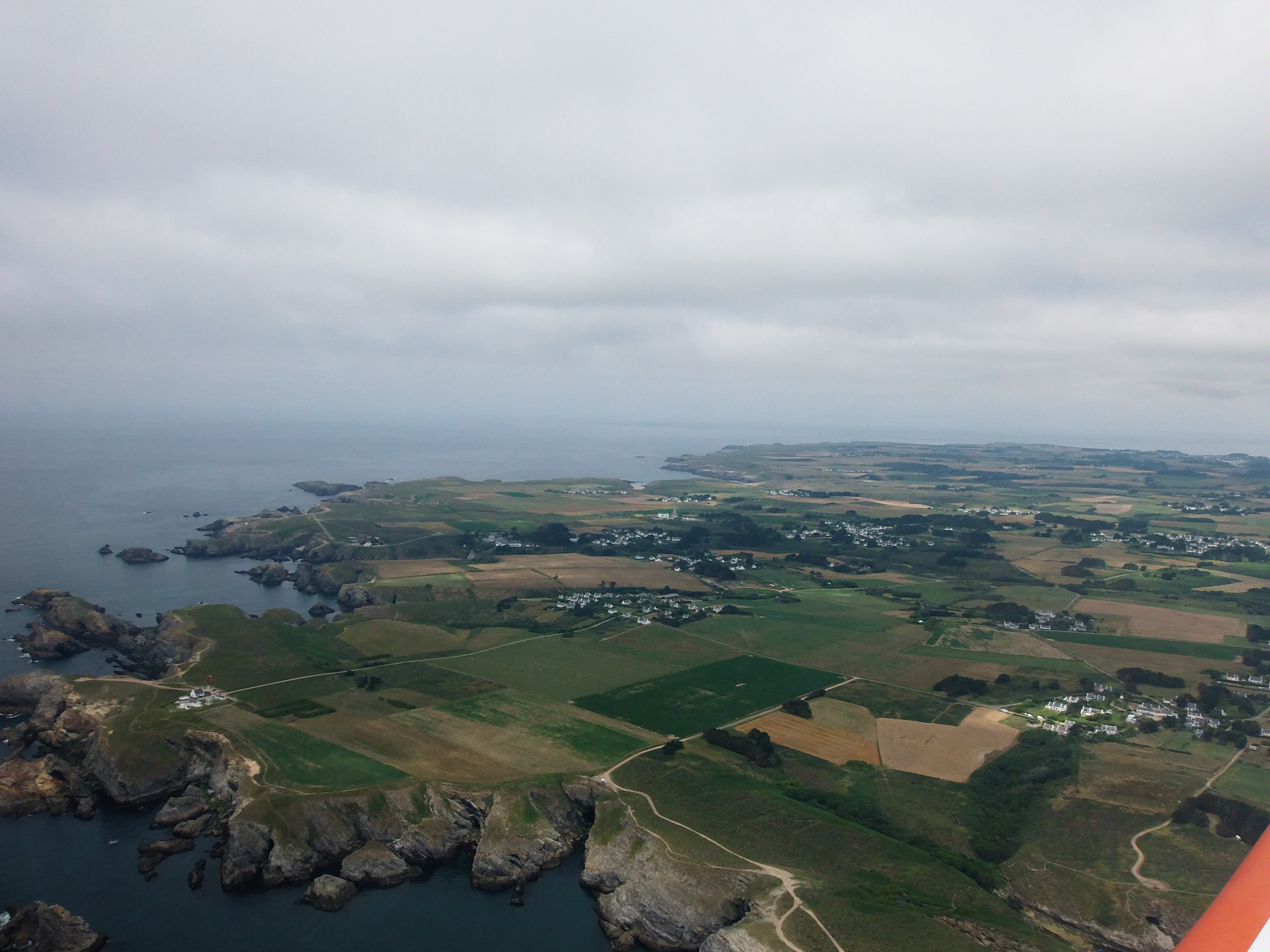
Aerial view of Bangor

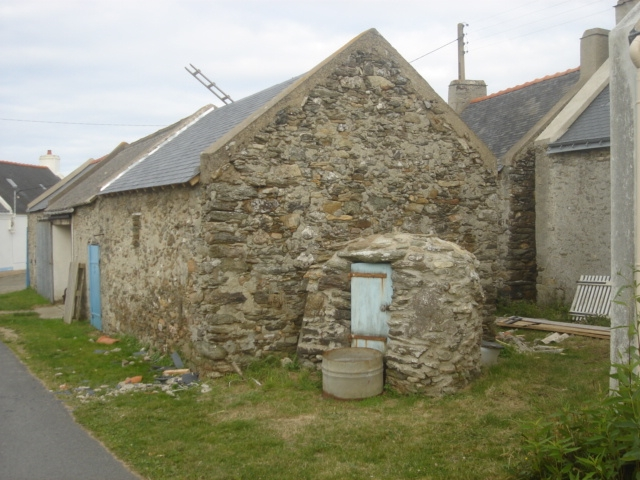
Long house with the Well

=== Civil heritage ===
The commune has many buildings and structures that are registered as historical monuments:

- A Tumulus NE of the Aerodrome (Prehistoric)
- An old Radar Station at Port-Croton (20th century)
- The Goulphar Lighthouse (1826) has one of the most powerful lights on the French coast. Built from 1826 to 1833, it was commissioned in 1835 and is a granite building 47 m high which rises to 84 m above the sea level. Its light beam flashes at intervals of 3 and 7 seconds. With the present optical system it is visible at 28 Nautical miles.
- Fortified works (18th century)
- The Pierre Sainte Anne Menhir at Kervarijon (Prehistoric)
- A Tumulus at Kervarijon (Prehistoric)
- Houses (19th century)
- The Town Hall (19th century)
- A Bakery at Borsauz (18th century)
- The Loge Agricultural Store room at Bordenec'h (19th century)
- A Well at Radenac (19th century)
- A Mill at Varrec (1858)

=== Religious heritage ===
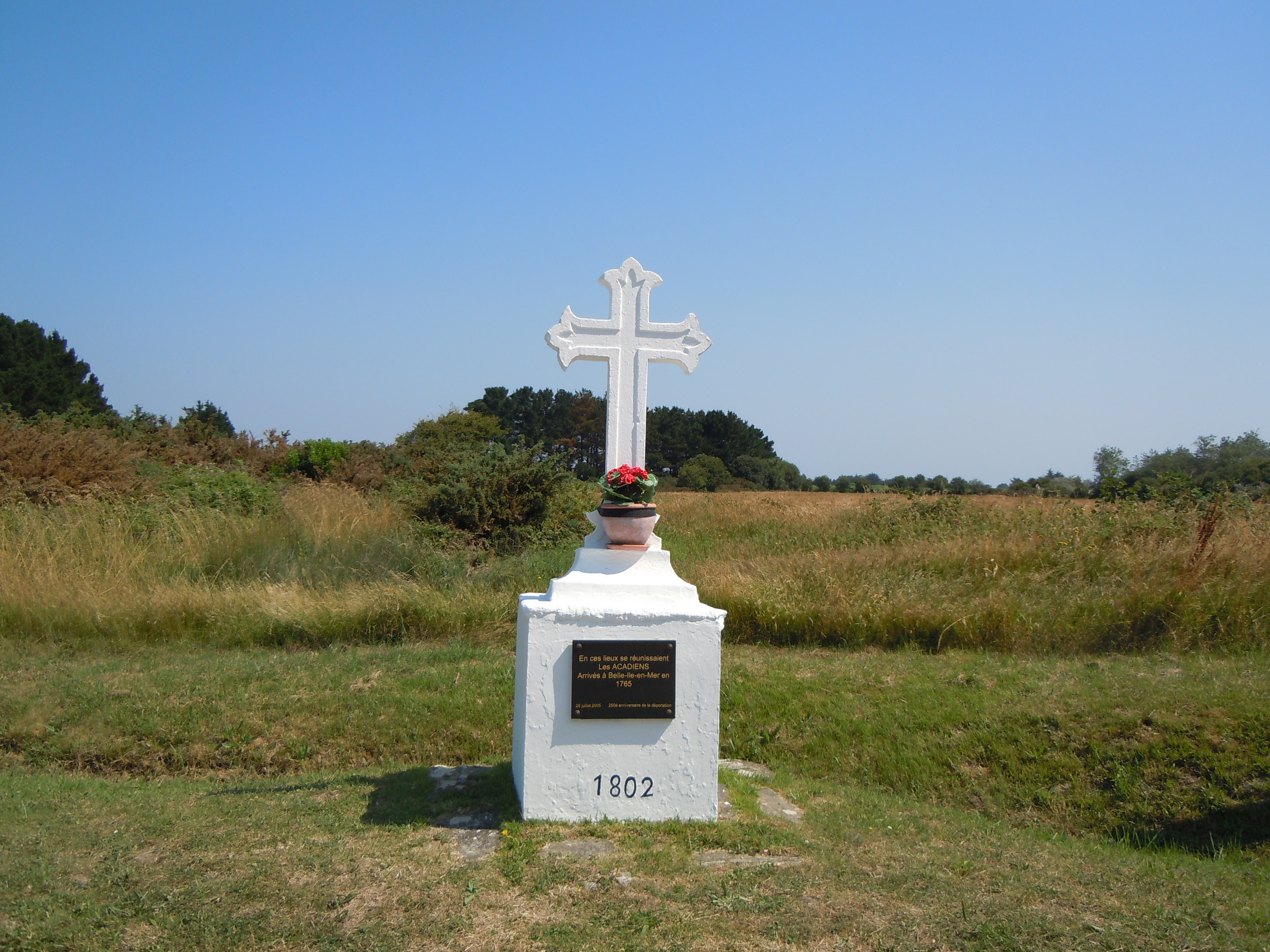
A Monumental Cross

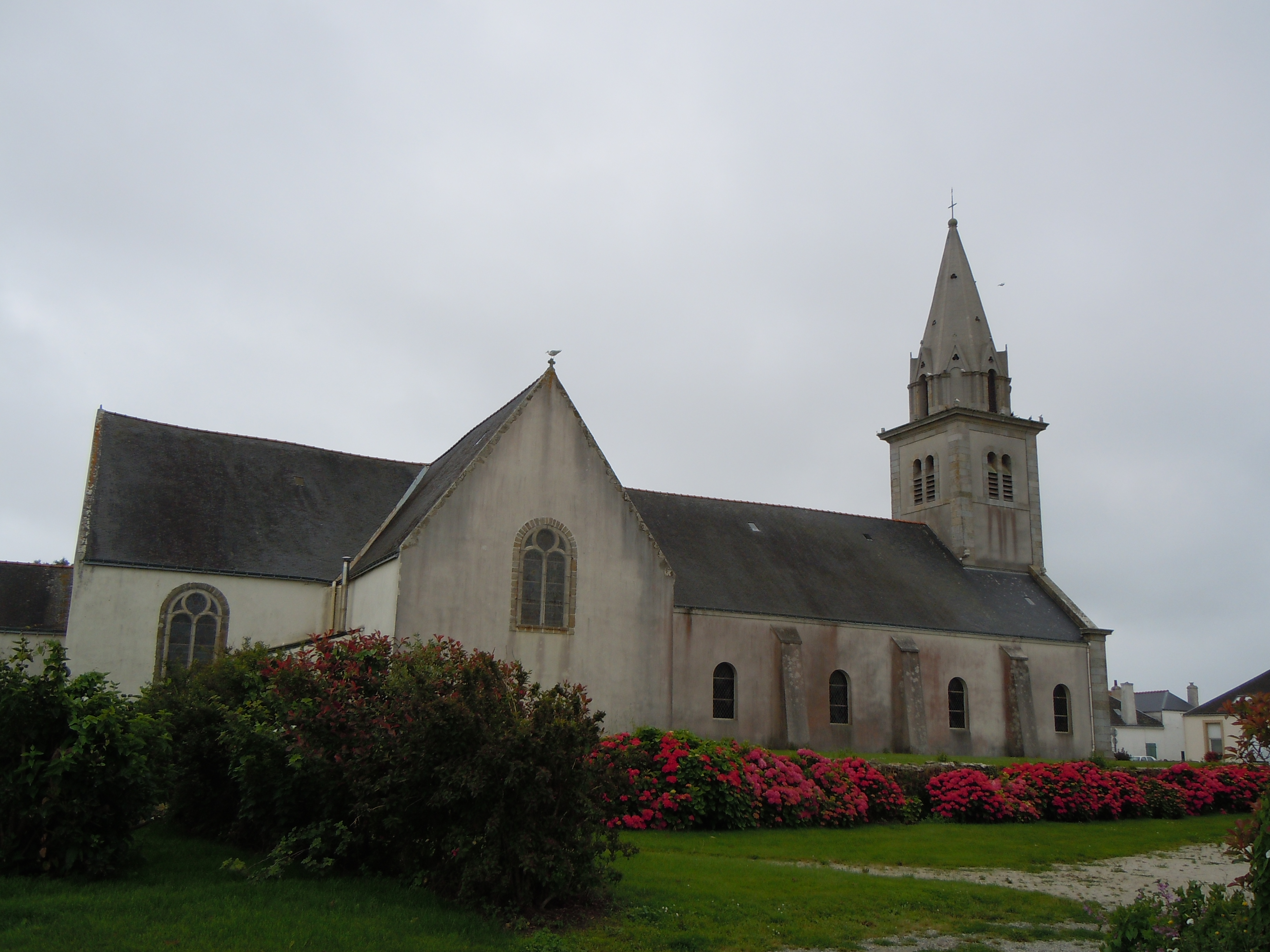
Parish Church of Saints Peter and Paul

The commune has several religious buildings and structures that are registered as historical monuments:

- Monumental Crosses (19th-20th century)
- The Parish Church of Saints Peter and Paul (16th century)
- A Presbytery (1790)
- The Chapels of Saint-Guénolé, Saint-Thomas, and Saint-Armand (destroyed)

=== Bangor Picture Gallery ===
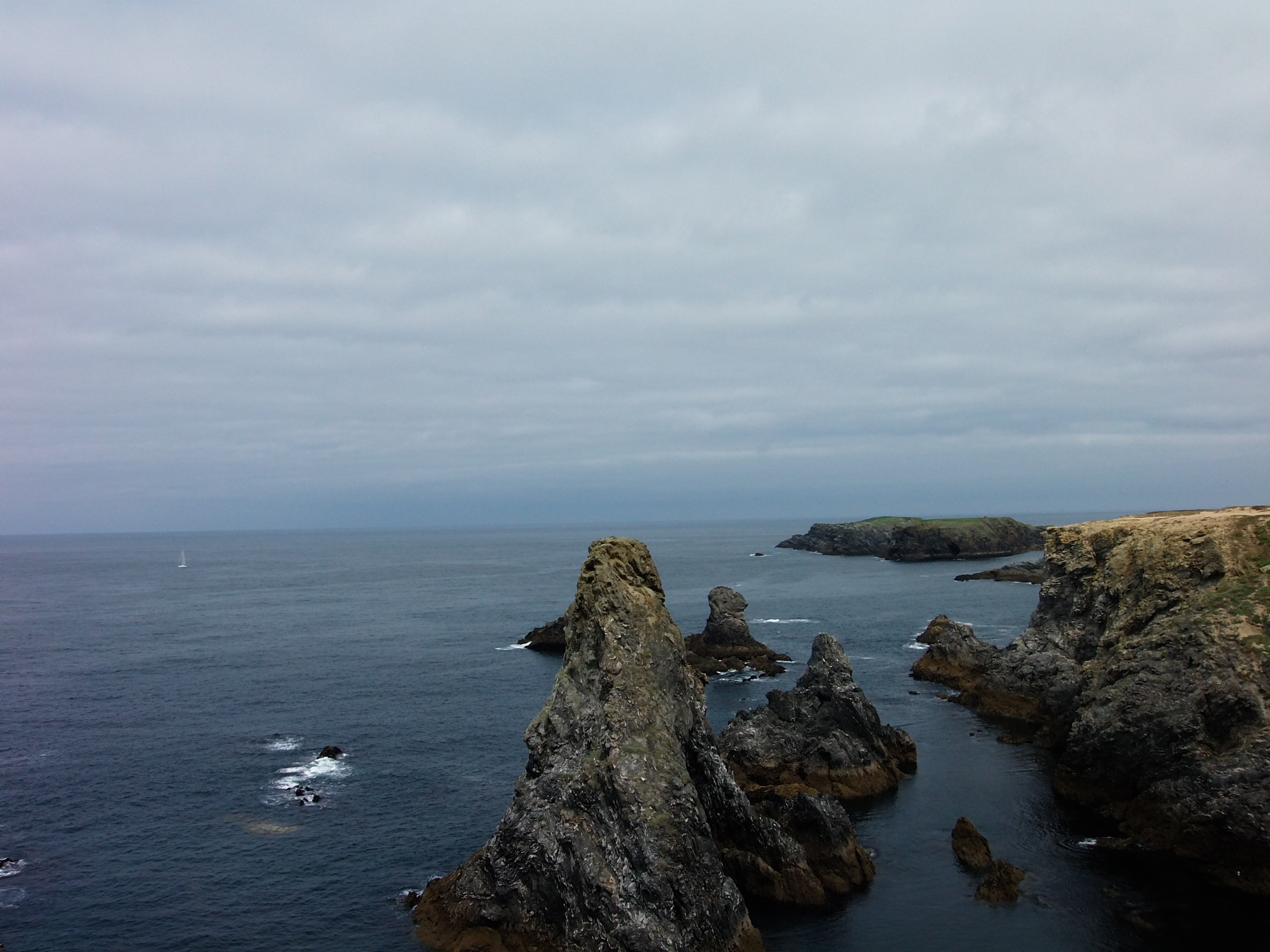
Aiguilles de Port-Coton

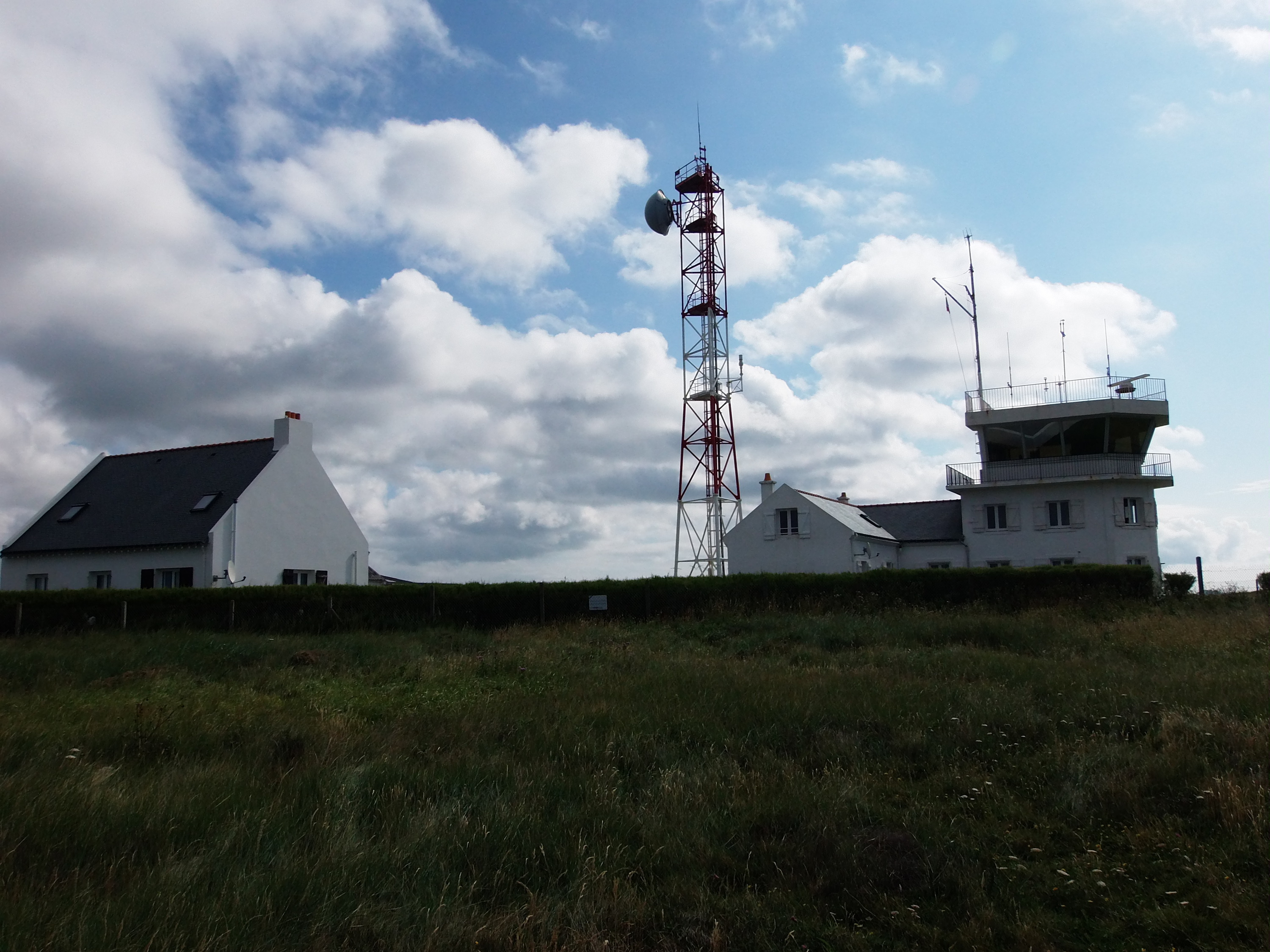
Semaphore of Talut

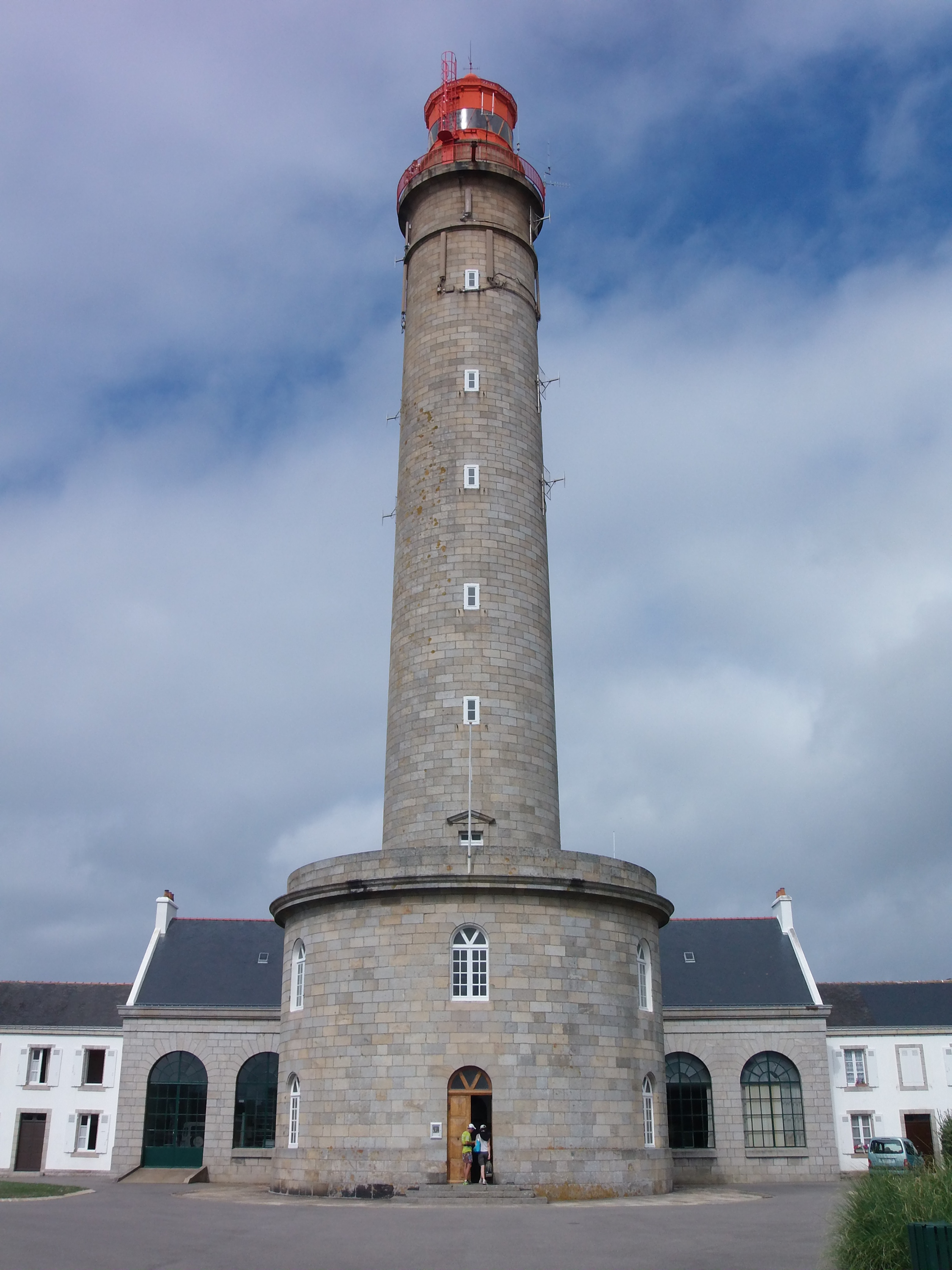
The Goulphar Lighthouse

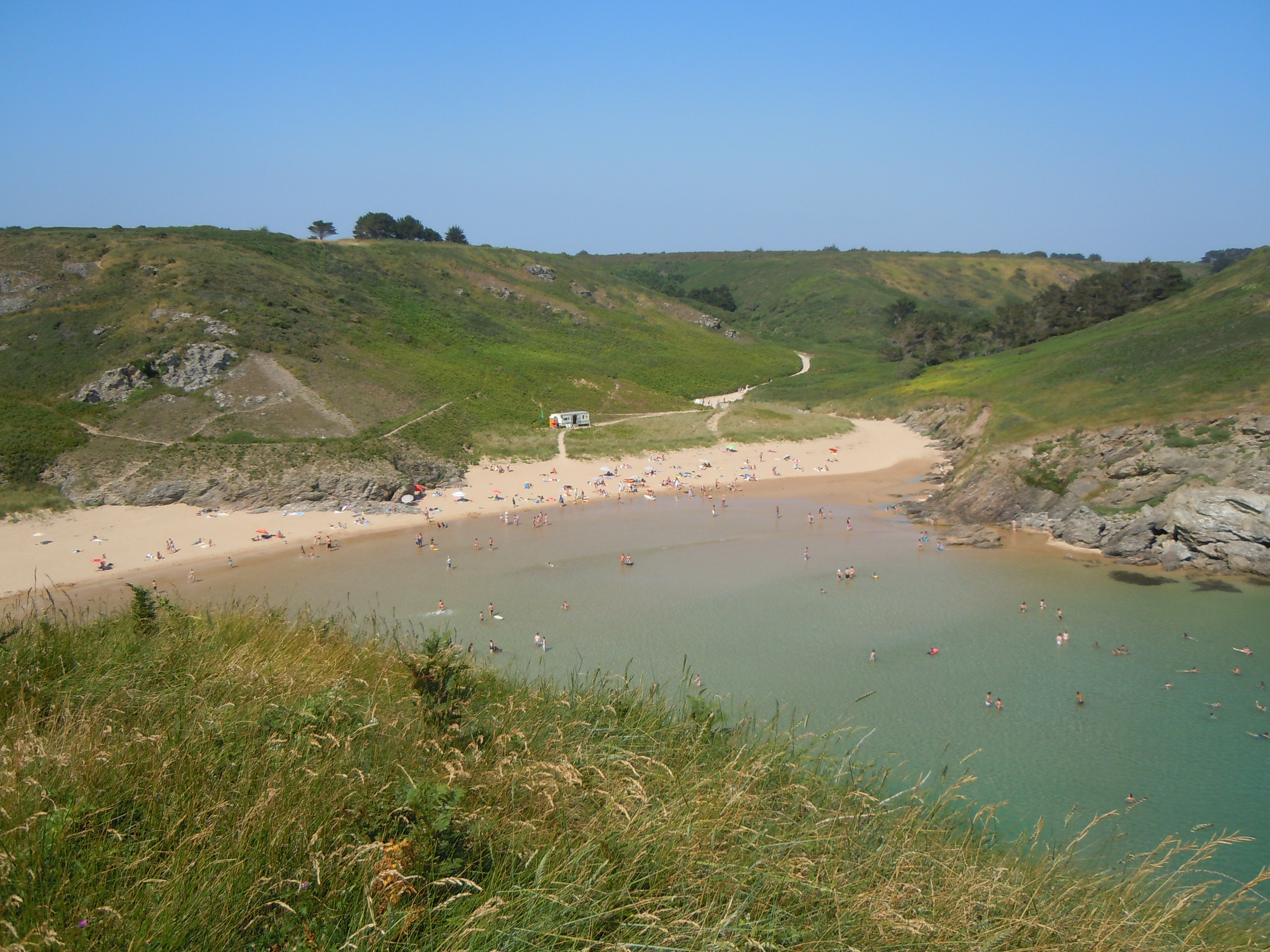
Herlin Beach

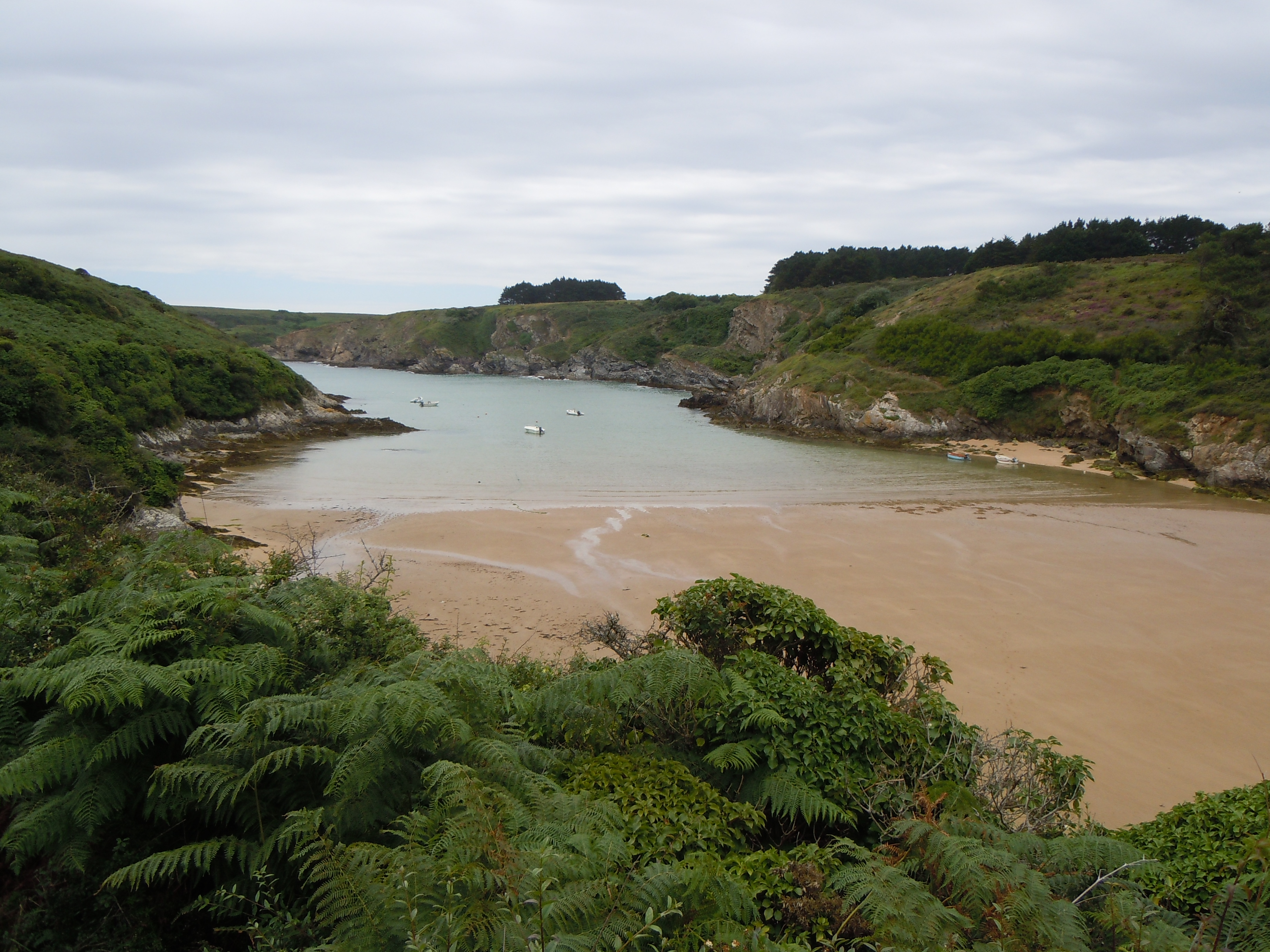
Port Kerel

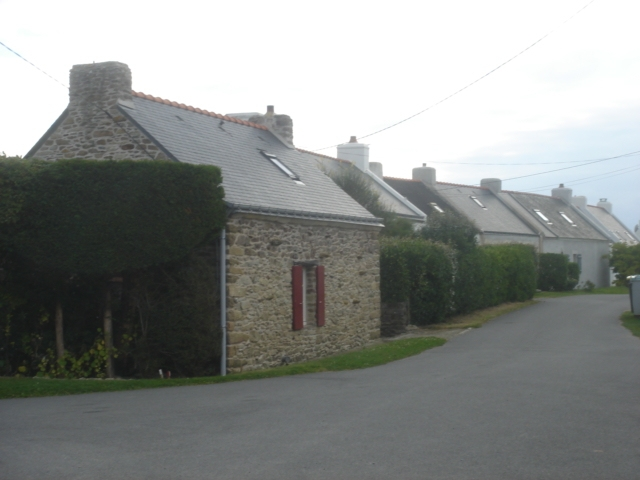
A line of Houses

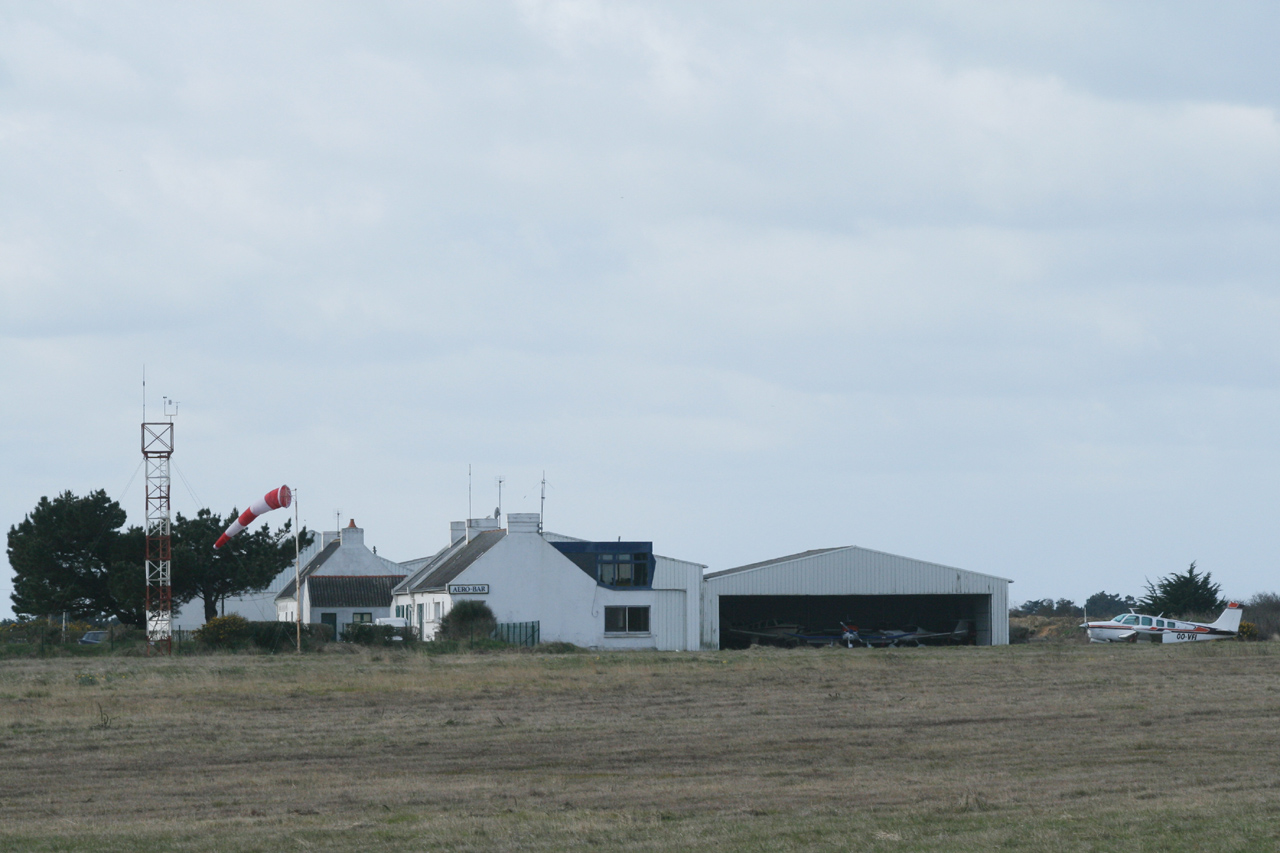
The Aero-club

== Notable people linked to the commune ==
- John Russell, Australian painter, arrived at Belle-Île-en-Mer in 1883. He first stayed in a rented house in Envag before building a mansion called the "Château de l'anglais" (English Chateau) at Goulphar.
- Claude Monet lived in the village of Kervilahouen
- Françoise Bangor, the first woman painter in Belle-Île, stayed in Envague. She often came on holidays with her parents and succumbed to the beauty of the island. She continued to paint the rugged coastline, the villages, and to sketch the fishermen from 1935 to 1953.
- Henry Moret, painted Goulpher

Paintings of Bangor

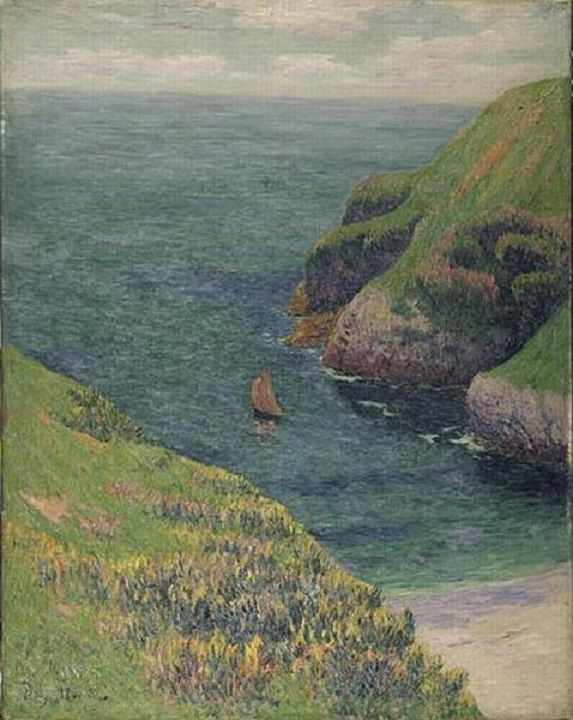
Henry Moret: Goulpher (actually Goulphar in 1895 or 1896,Musée d'Orsay)

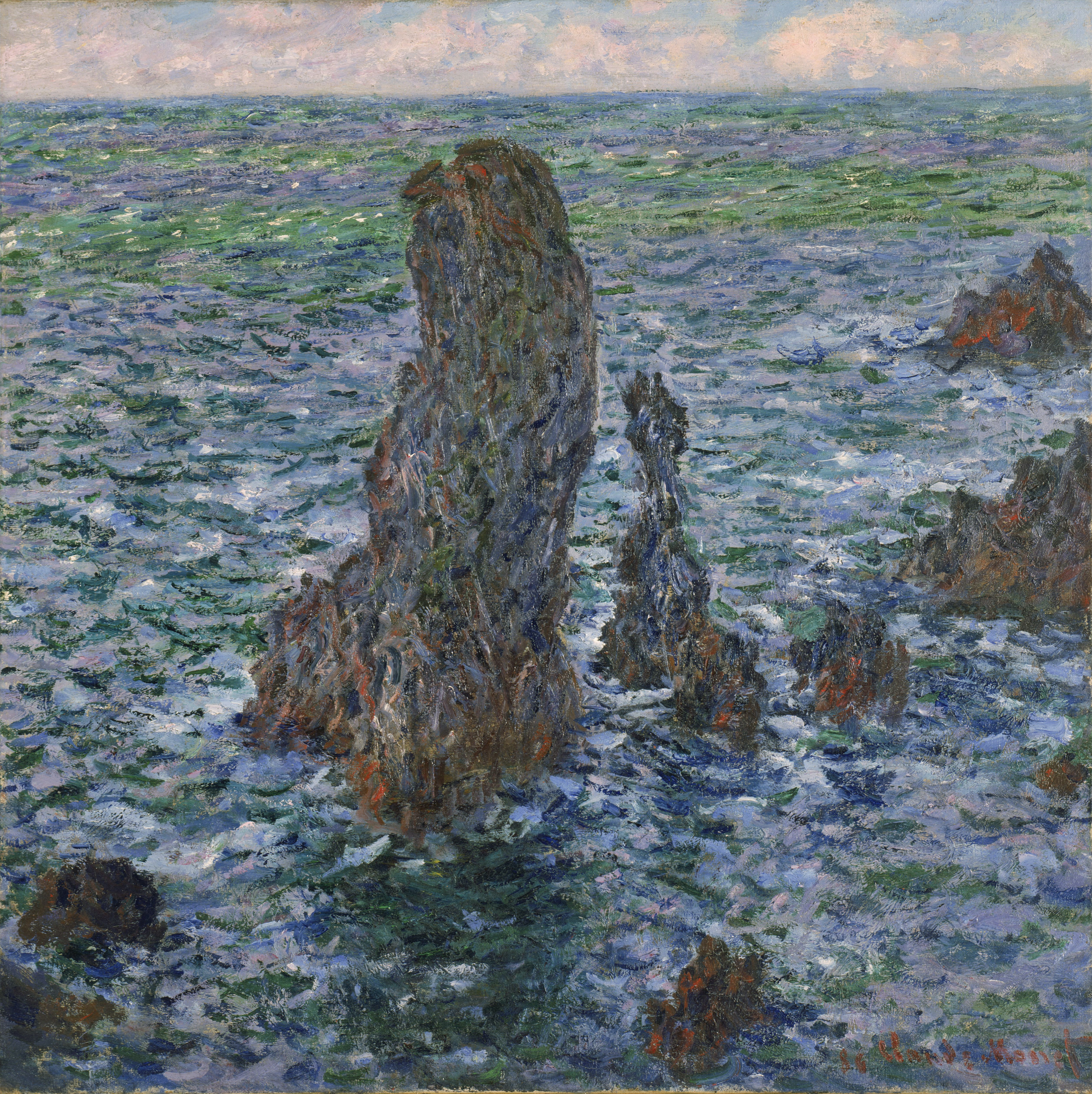
Claude Monet: Les Aiguilles de Port-Coton (Eagles of Port Coton), 1886

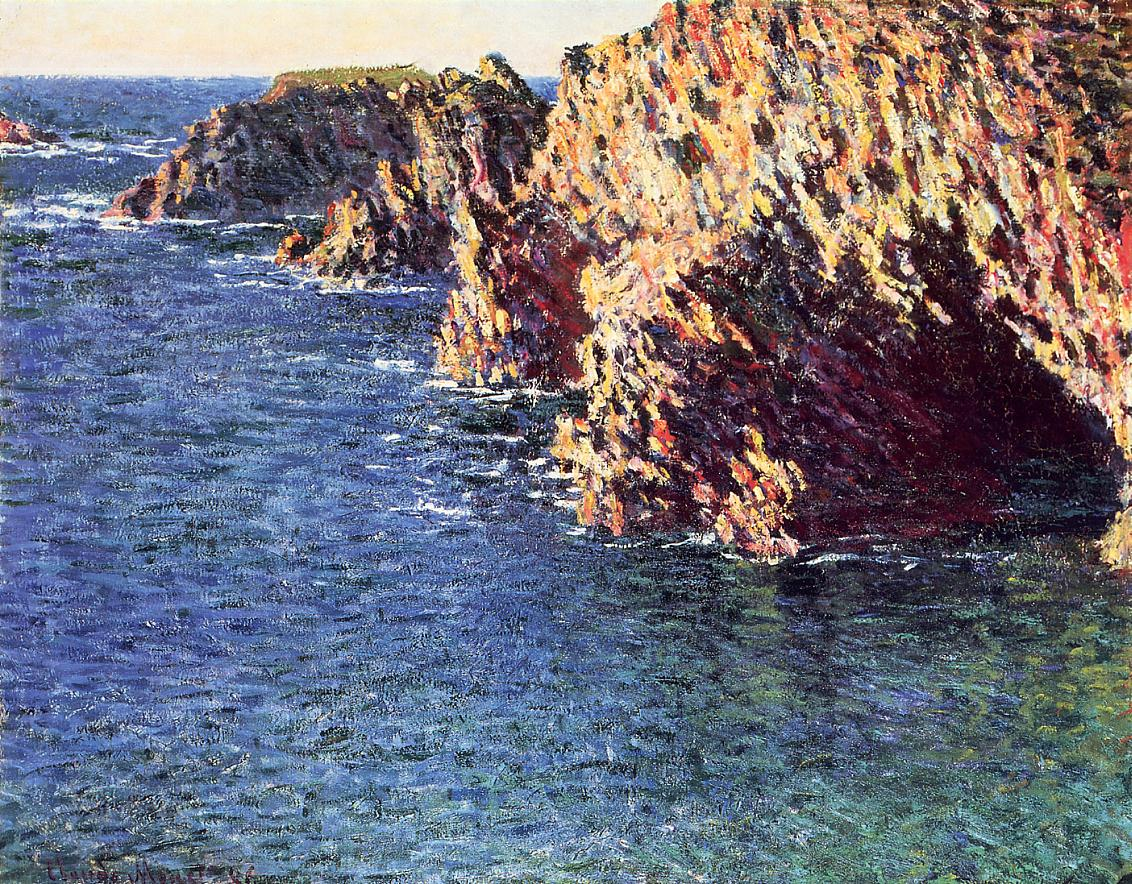
Claude Monet: Grotte de Port-Domois (Port Domois Cave), 1886

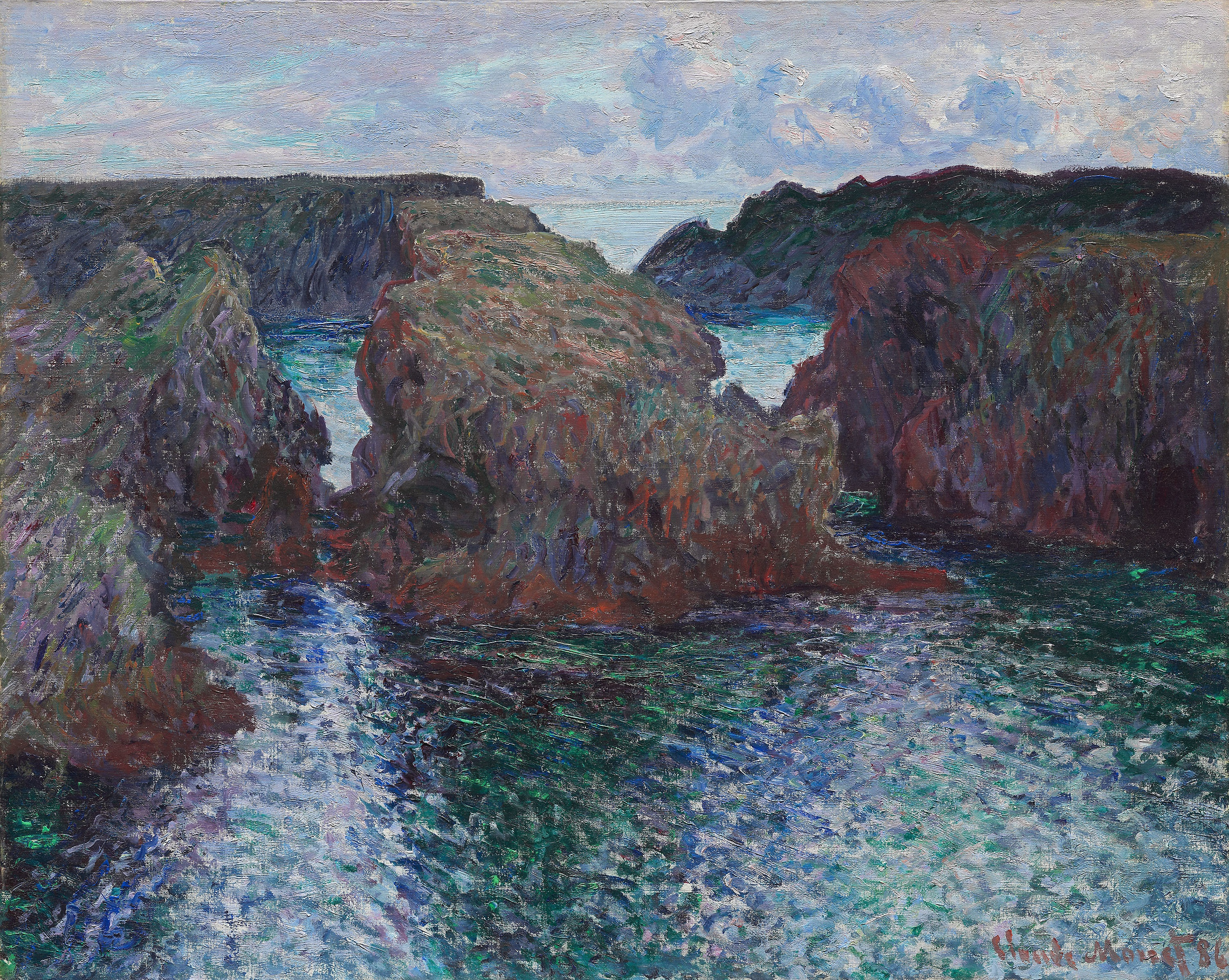
Claude Monet: Paysage à Port-Goulphar (Countryside at Port Goulphar), 1886

== See also ==
- Communes of the Morbihan department
