= Hedwige Chrétien =

French composer (1859–1944)

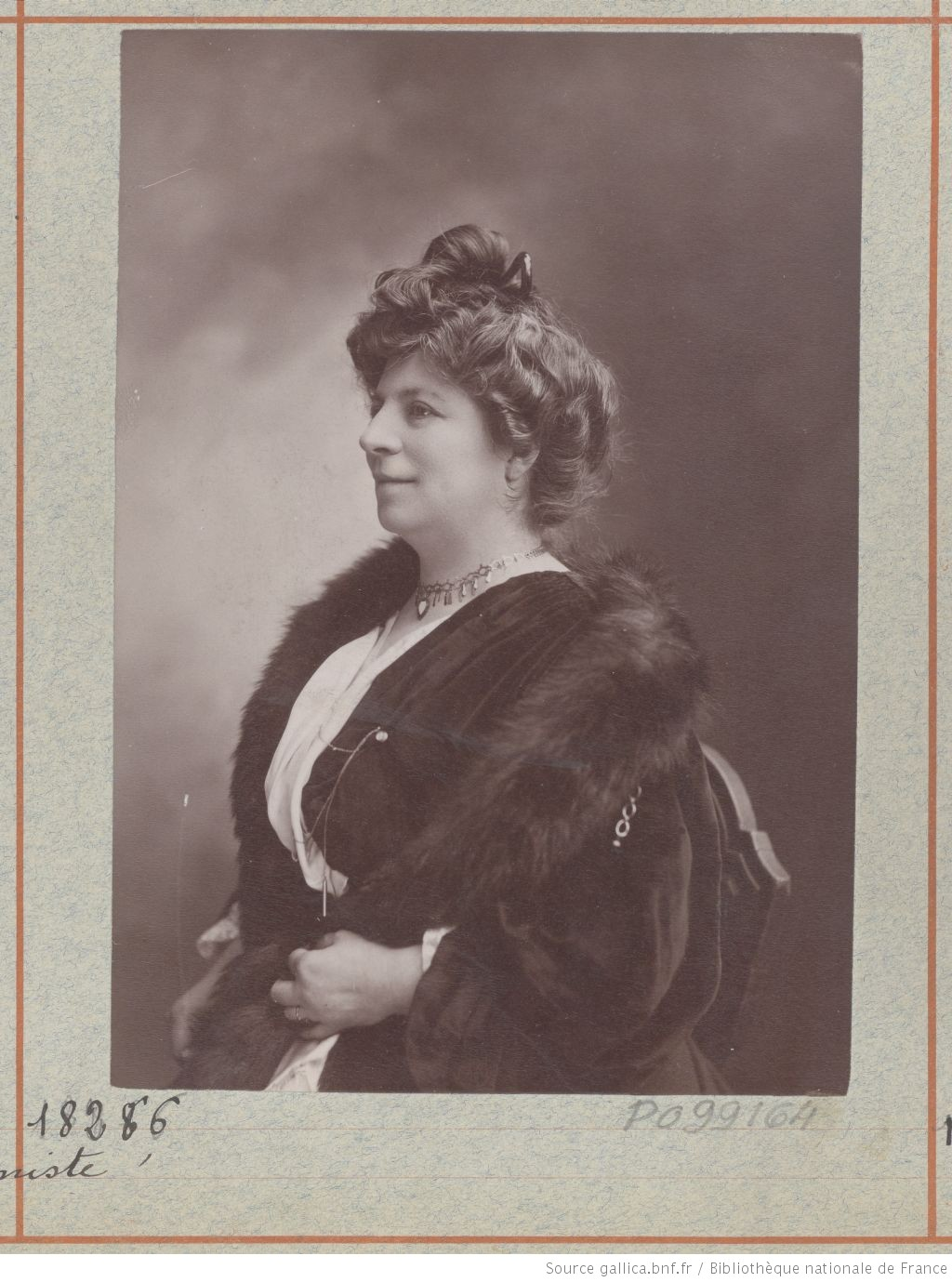
Hedwige Chrétien captured by Nadar around 1890

Hedwige (Gennaro)-Chrétien (5 July 1859 – 4 April 1944) was a French composer.

== Life ==
Born in Compiègne, Chrétien was appointed professor at the Paris Conservatoire in 1889 where she had previously been a student from 1874, studying with Ernest Guiraud. In 1881, she won first prize in harmony, counterpoint and fugue. She also won first prize in piano and in composition in other concours, which she entered. She was a prolific composer, yet not much else is known about her life. Her compositions, about 150 in all, consist of pieces for piano, orchestral and chamber works, songs, two ballets and two one-act operas.

One of the most extensive collections of her work in the United States is held in the University of Michigan's Women Composers Collection, which is available on microfilm from there and other libraries.

== Selected works ==
=== Ballets ===
- Ballet orientale, ballet
- La Valée des sphinx, ballet in two acts

=== Chamber works ===
- Berceuse (violin)
- Grand solo (Andante et Allegro) (1886) (trombone)
- In memoriam (1934) (violoncello and organ)
- Lied 'Soir d'Automne' (cello and piano)
- Poème lyrique (1886) (competitive examination winner for Société des compositeurs de musique)
- Quintette (Arabesque et Sarabande) (flute, oboe, clarinet, bassoon, and horn)
- Serenade sous bois (trio for flute, oboe and piano)
- Trio pour violon, violoncello and piano (Allegro con fuoco, Andante expressivo, Scherzo)

=== Choral ===
- Les Ailes du rêve!
- L'Angelus
- Août, words by Horace Hennion from Mois, Mixed choir SATB
- Ballade
- L'Été
- La Madone des champs (3 voices)
- Les Matelots
- Le Moulin
- Nos Soldats, scène lyrique, bass and tenor soloists and choir SATB, with orchestra
- Pensée fugitive
- Sur la Falaise, words by Paul Bourget, children's choir SA

=== Opera ===
- La Cinquantaine, opérette pour jeunes filles
- Menuet de l'Impératrice, opérette pour jeunes filles

=== Orchestral ===
- Belle époque (1887) (chamber orchestra)
- Danse Rustique (orchestral)
- L'Escarpolette, waltz for orchestra
- Fleur de Lande, ronde Bretonne (orchestral)
- Pastels (orchestral)

=== Organ and/or harmonium ===
- 1908 [no title] in Echos jubilaires des maîtres de l'orgue (Arras : Procure générale de musique religieuse). Reprinted 1929.
- 1920 Harmonies religieuses : pièces [...] à l'usage du service divin (Paris : Procure générale, Paris)
- 1920 Inspirations religieuses. Pièces [...] à l'usage du service divin (Vol. 4.): 'Andante religioso'; 'Vision céleste'; 'Andante con moto'; 'Elévation'; 'Communion'; 'Prière à la madone'. NB with a biographical sketch by H. Delépine. (Paris : Procure générale de musique religieuse)
- 1924 Six pièces brèves (Paris : Procure générale de musique religieuse)
- 1930 Trois pièces: 'Andante religioso'; 'Elévation'; 'Marche religieuse' (Paris : Procure générale de musique religieuse)
- 1932 Parfums d'encens. Pièces [...] dans l'esprit grégorien, à l'usage de l'office divin. Vol.1. (Paris : Procure générale de musique religieuse)
- 1934 'Communion' in Trois noëls anciens (Saint Leu-la-Forêt : Procure générale de musique religieuse)
- 1990 Premier album du jeune organiste : Pièces très faciles doigtées et progressives (Bole : Ed. Musicales de la Schola Cantorum et de la Procure Générale de Musique.
- (?) Cinq pièces brèves (organ)
- (?) Marche funèbre (organ)

==== Organ (or piano) with other instruments ====
- 1934 In memoriam: with saxophone or violoncello (Paris : L. Jacquot)

=== Piano ===
- Ariel caprice fantastique
- Au village. Le moulin, scènes pastorales
- Chansons du rouet
- En cheminant, ritournelle pour piano
- Farandole
- Fleur de landes, ronde bretonne
- Naïades
- Les Papillons, valse de salon
- Polichinelles roses
- Pour endormir Yvonne, berceuse (lullaby) by H. Pommier arranged for piano by Hedwige Chrétien.
- Qui vive!?, morceau de genre
- Rataboul (1905) (polka for piano)
- Romance sans paroles
- Scherzo-valse
- La Source
- Speranza, valse lente
- Tarentelle, pour piano à 4 mains, piano four hands
- Trilby
- Valse berceuse
- Valse-caprice
- Valse des libellules
- Sonatines
  - No.1: Pastorale
  - No.2: Dès l'Aurore
  - No.3: Joyeuse Nouvelle

=== Vocal ===
(All compositions are for voice and piano unless otherwise noted.)

- Aubade, words by P. Ladoué
- Aube aux Champs words by Léo Marcel
- Baiser errants, words by L. Fortolis
- Ballade, de s'amye bien belle, words by Clément Marot (1527)
- Bébés et grand'mamans
- Bien-Aimés, words by Charles Giugno
- Canzonetta, words by Pierre Ladoué
- Caprice de troubadour, words by Gaston Petit
- C'est si peu de chose
- Chanson des pêcheurs de lune, Barcarolle à deux voix (duet), words by L. Fortolis
- Chanson pur la Bien-Aimée, words by Charles Fuster
- Chant d'amour
- Dernier rêve!, words by L. Fortolis
- Duetto-Barcarolle, words by Eduard Guinand
- Feux follets, words by L. Fortolis
- La chanson bénie, words by Léon Dierx
- La Jeanneton, words by J. Lafforgue
- La Nuit, words by R. Elgé, two voices, violin and piano
- La Vieille fontaine, words by Pierre Alin
- Là-bas!, chanson Bohémienne, words by Léo Marcel
- Le Calme, words by A. Dorchain, Voice, piano and violin obligato
- Le Cavalier, words by Léo Marcel (Légende fantastique)
- Le coeur de mira, extrait des chansons moraves, words by L. Fortolis
- Le Cor, words by Alfred de Vigny
- Le Rouet sur le clavecin, words by Raymond Philippon
- Les Ailes du Rêve, words by Charles Fuster
- Les rêves, words by A. Dréville
- L'Étoile, with piano and violin
- Lumière de l'âme, words by Madame Galeron de Calonne
- Mademoiselle bébé, à grand-papa, words by J. Morin
- Mirage-Habanera, words by Eduard Guinand
- Mon Ruisseau, poésie de J. Lafforgue
- Musique au bord de la Mer, poésie de Dorchais, adaption with violin
- Noël naïf
- Point d'orgue du menuet, inspired by a painting by Watteau, words by Léo Marcel
- Pour ceux qui aiment, words by Aymé Magnien, Voice, piano and violin obligato
- Pour nos soldats, prière. words and music by Hedwige Chrétien
- Prière, words by Lamartine, with violin
- Prismes lunaires, words by L. Fortolis,
- Quand tu pleureras, words by Léo Marcel
- Que je t'oublie!? (1897), words by Léo Marcel
- Reliques, words by J. Lafforgue
- Ronde champêtre
- Ronde d'amour, words by Jules Lafforgue
- Silhouettes fantasques/Clair de lune, words by Marguerite Bracks
- Sur la route d'Alcala, Voice and orchestra
- Votre sourire, words by Eva Jouan

== Recordings ==
- Quintette on Casino Belle Epoque played by Le Concert Impromptu, Verany-Arion/Abeille musique PV 796044 (1996)
- Vision played by Gaston Crunelle (flute) and Lucien Petitjean (piano); Gramophone K6999 (recorded 1933)

== Media ==
Que je t'oublie? (1897) For voice and piano

Que je t'oublie?

Comment veux-tu que je t'oublie?	How can you expect me to forget you?
Quand sur ta lèvre si jolie	When from those lovely lips,
Je pris l'autre jour un baiser?	I received a kiss the other day?
J'ai de la joie à m'en griser,	I was intoxicated with joy,
Comment veux-tu que je t'oublie?	How can you expect me to forget you?
Comment veux-tu que je t'oublie?	How can you expect me to forget you?
Quand à genoux je te supplie,	When on bended knee I beg you,
Bavard, inquiet, amoureux?	Babbling, worried and enamoured?
Après un baiser j'en veux deux!	After one kiss I wanted two!
Comment veux-tu que je t'oublie?	How can you expect me to forget you?
Comment veux-tu que je t'oublie,	How can you expect me to forget you,
Quand tout ce bonheur qui nous lie,	When all this happiness that binds us,
Remplit ma vie en un moment?	Filled my life in one moment?
Les heures qu'on passe en aimant,	The hours which we spent loving,
Comment veux-tu qu'on les oublie?	How can you expect me to forget them?
Léo Marcel	(Translation by Mike Hayes)
