= Judic =

Judic is a French surname. Notable people with the surname include:

- Anna Judic (1849–1911), French comic actress
- Danielle Judic (c. 1952–?), French missing person

== See also ==
- Judike, medieval kingdoms in Sardinia
