= French ship Beautemps-Beaupré =

Five French Navy ships have been named after the hydrographer Charles-François Beautemps-Beaupré:

- French cruiser Beautemps-Beaupré, a Bourayne-class cruiser (1872 - 1896)
- The former patrol boat D'Estaing (1 100 t, 64 m), built during the First World War, converted to a hydrographic vessel in 1919–20, decommissioned 1935
- A hydrographic ship derived from a colonial aviso of the Dumont-D'Urville type, scuttled in 1940 before completion (2 000 t, 106 m)
- The former aviation tender Sans Souci, turned into an escort vessel on the Liberation, then a hydrographic aviso (2 000 t, 95 m) (1946 - 1969)
- French ship Beautemps-Beaupré (2002)
