= Charles-François Beautemps-Beaupré =

French hydrographer (1766–1854)

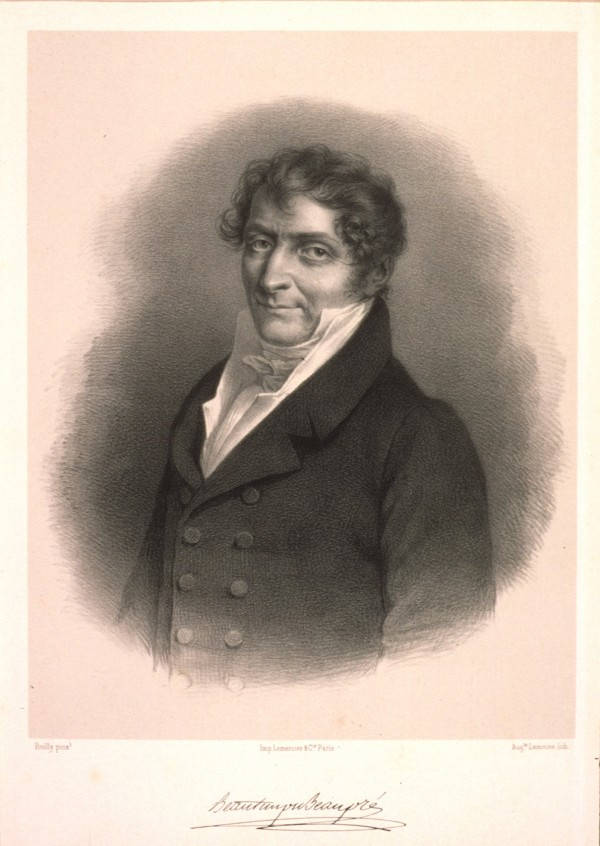

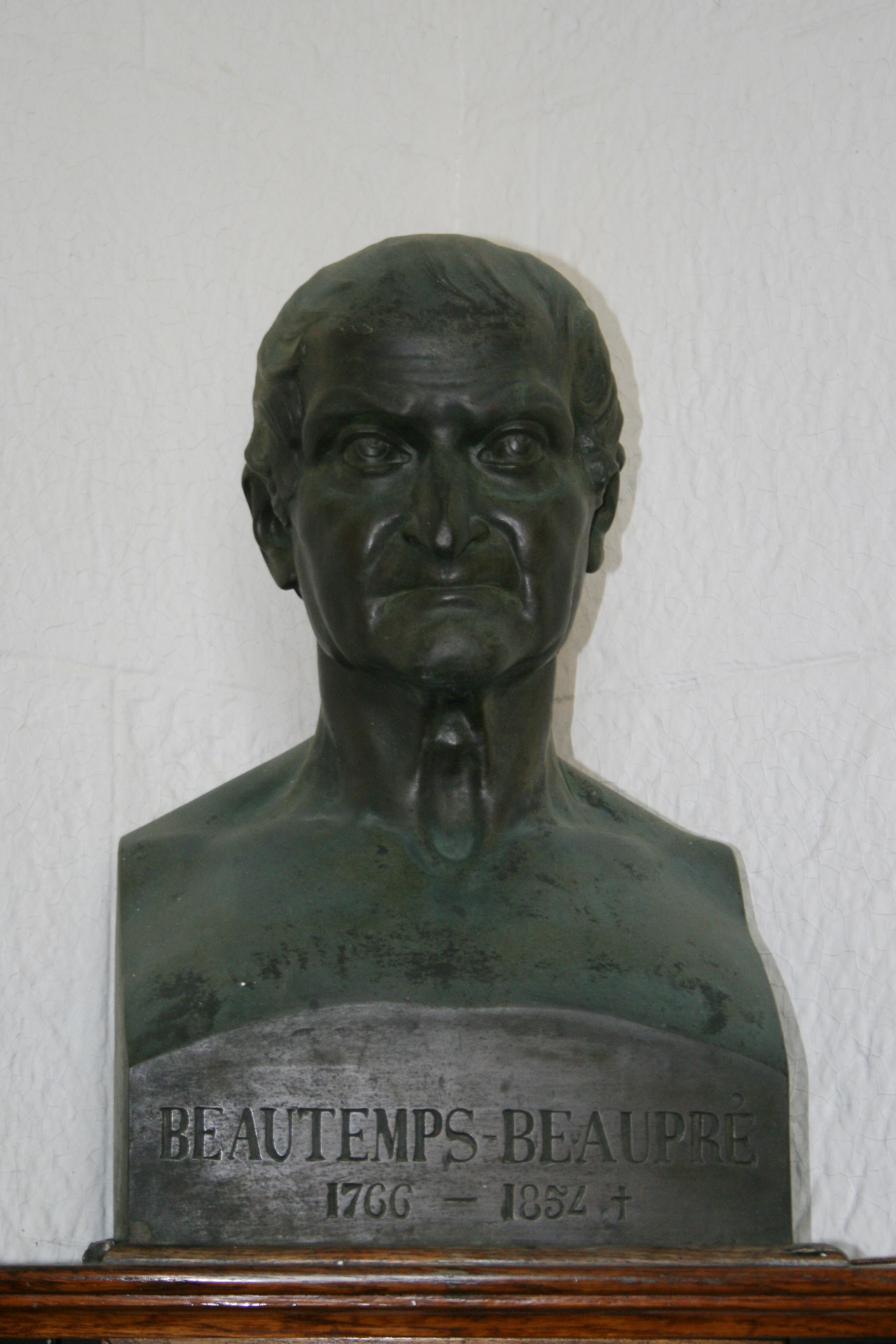
Bust in the phare de Goulphar on Belle-Ile

Charles-François Beautemps-Beaupré (French pronunciation: [ʃaʁl fʁɑ̃swa botɑ̃ bopʁe]; 6 August 1766 in La Neuville-au-Pont – 16 March 1854 in Paris) was a French hydrographer, hydrographic engineer and cartographer.

== Biography ==
He accompanied the expedition sent in search of La Pérouse in 1791, and made valuable charts of many of the places it visited. Subsequently, he was employed in all of the important hydrographic labours undertaken during the First French Empire and the Bourbon Restoration.

He was elected a member of the Académie des sciences in 1810 and was appointed chief hydrographer and keeper of the Dépôt de la Marine (predecessor of the Naval Hydrographic and Oceanographic Service) in 1814. His work earned him the name “father of hydrography.”

Five navy ships have been named after him, and busts of him are to be found on the phare de Dunkerque and the phare de Goulphar (Belle-Île-en-Mer).

== Works ==
- An introduction to the practice of nautical surveying and the construction of sea charts
- Beautemps-Beaupré, Charles-François (1807). Atlas du voyage de Bruny-Dentrecasteaux: fait par ordre du gouvernement en 1791, 1792 et 1793, publié par ordre de sa Majesté l'Empereur et Roi, sous le ministère de son Excellence le vice-amiral Decrès [Bruny-Dentrecasteaux's Travel Atlas. Made by order of the government in 1791, 1792 and 1793, published by order of his Majesty the Emperor and King, under the ministry of His Excellency Vice-Admiral Decrès] (in French). Paris: Dépôt des cartes et plans de la Marine. OCLC 219855756. Wikidata Q23035638.

== See also ==
- European and American voyages of scientific exploration
