= Éva Jouan =

French poet

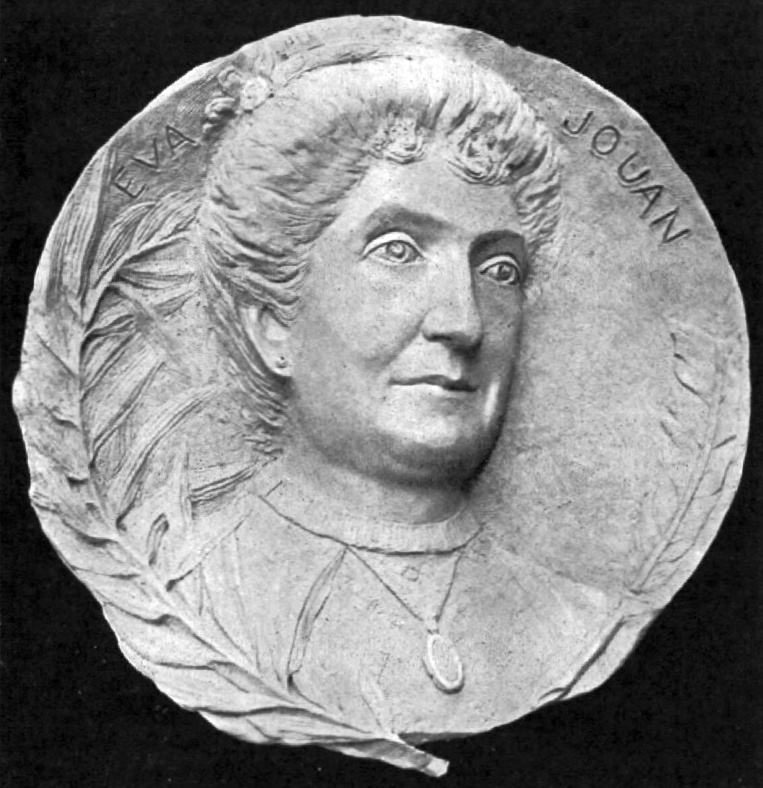
- Born: Marie-Évangeline-Prudence Jouan; April 17, 1857; Le Palais
- Died: February 4, 1910 (aged 52); Le Palais
- Occupation: poet

Marie-Évangeline-Prudence Jouan, known as Éva Jouan (1857-1910) was a French poet.

== Life ==
Éva Jouan was born at Le Palais in Belle-Île-en-Mer on April 17, 1857. She died there on February 10, 1910. She dubbed her island "the well-named" in one of the poems, Belle-Isle, from her collection De la grève, published in 1896.

== Works ==
- (with Gabrielle Gomien) Téméraires ambitions. Limoges: E. Ardant, 1901.
- Au bord de l'Océan. Limoges: E. Ardant, 1902.
- La Meilleure Part. Limoges: E. Ardant, 1903.
- Trois mois à Belle-Isle-en-Mer : journal d'une jeune fille. Paris, 1910
- L'abandonnée. Paris: Bonne presse, 1911.
