= French ship Beautemps-Beaupré (2002) =

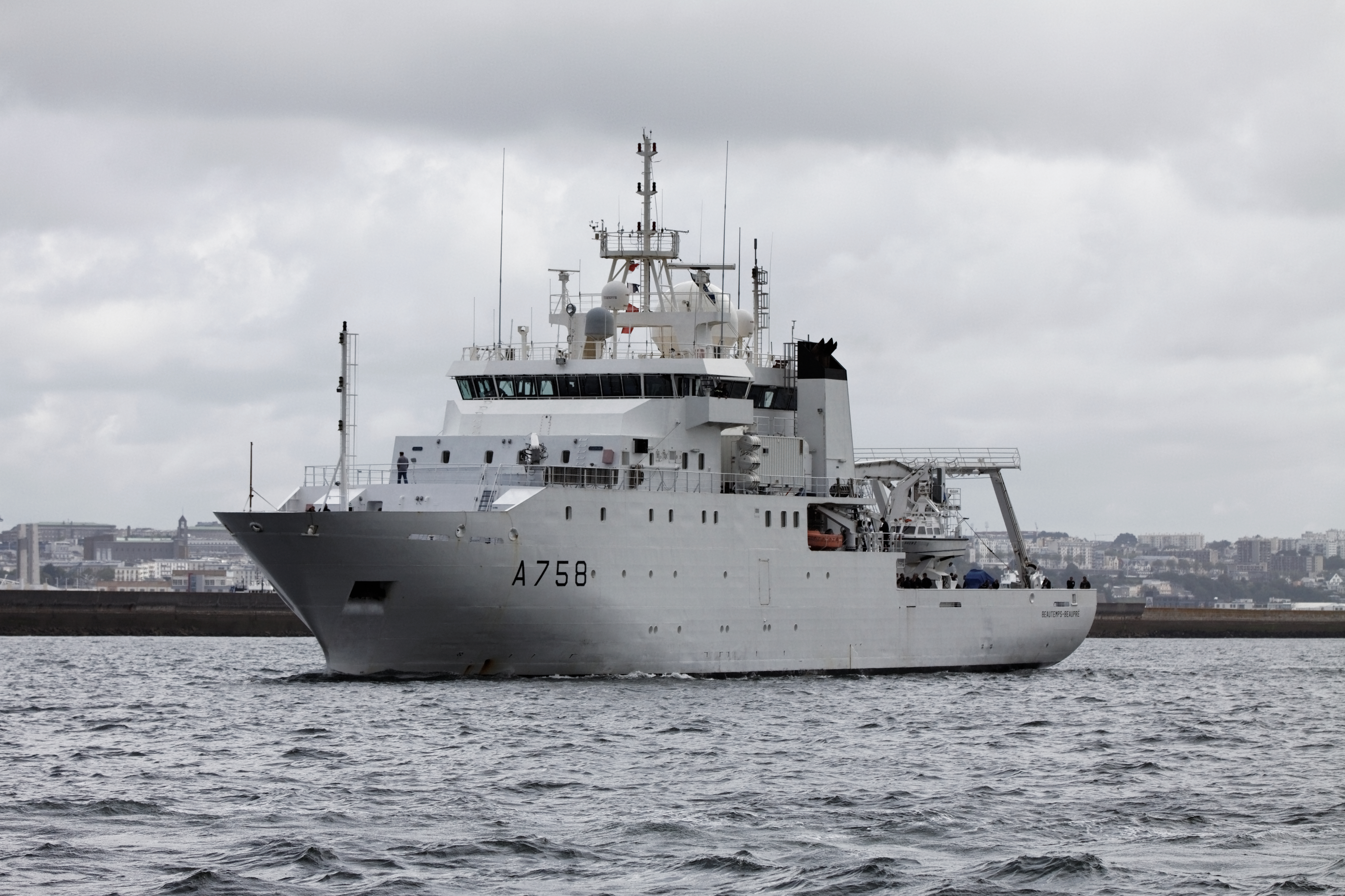
- Beautemps-Beaupré, Brest 2012

History

France
- Name: Beautemps-Beaupré
- Builder: Chantiers de l'Atlantique
- Laid down: 17 July 2001
- Launched: 26 April 2002
- In service: 13 December 2003
- Identification: IMO number: 9098361; Pennant number: A758
- Status: In service with the French Navy

General characteristics
- Class & type: Oceanographic survey vessel
- Displacement: 2125 tonnes standard, 3300 tonnes full load
- Length: 80.64 m (264 ft 7 in)
- Beam: 14.90 m (48 ft 11 in)
- Draught: 6.20 m (20 ft 4 in)
- Propulsion: Diesel Electric Propulsion : four diesel alternators and Mitsubishi electric motor (2200 kW) Alstom, 1 propeller of 3000 hp (2200 kW), 1 bow thruster 440 kW 2 reverse thrusters 220 kilowatts
- Speed: 14 knots (26 km/h; 16 mph)
- Crew: 50; 5 officers, 14 petty officers, 10 seamen, 21 surveyors and technicians

Beautemps-Beaupré is a ship of the French Naval Hydrographic and Oceanographic Service, named after the hydrographer Charles-François Beautemps-Beaupré. It replaced Espérance, decommissioned in 2000. the vessel was launched on 26 April 2002 and entered service on 13 December 2003.

== Service history ==
On 9 May 2025, Beautemps-Beaupré arrived at the Port of Colombo, Sri Lanka on a goodwill visit. The vessel departed the island on 13 May.
