= Le Palais =

Le Palais Porzh-Lae
- Commune
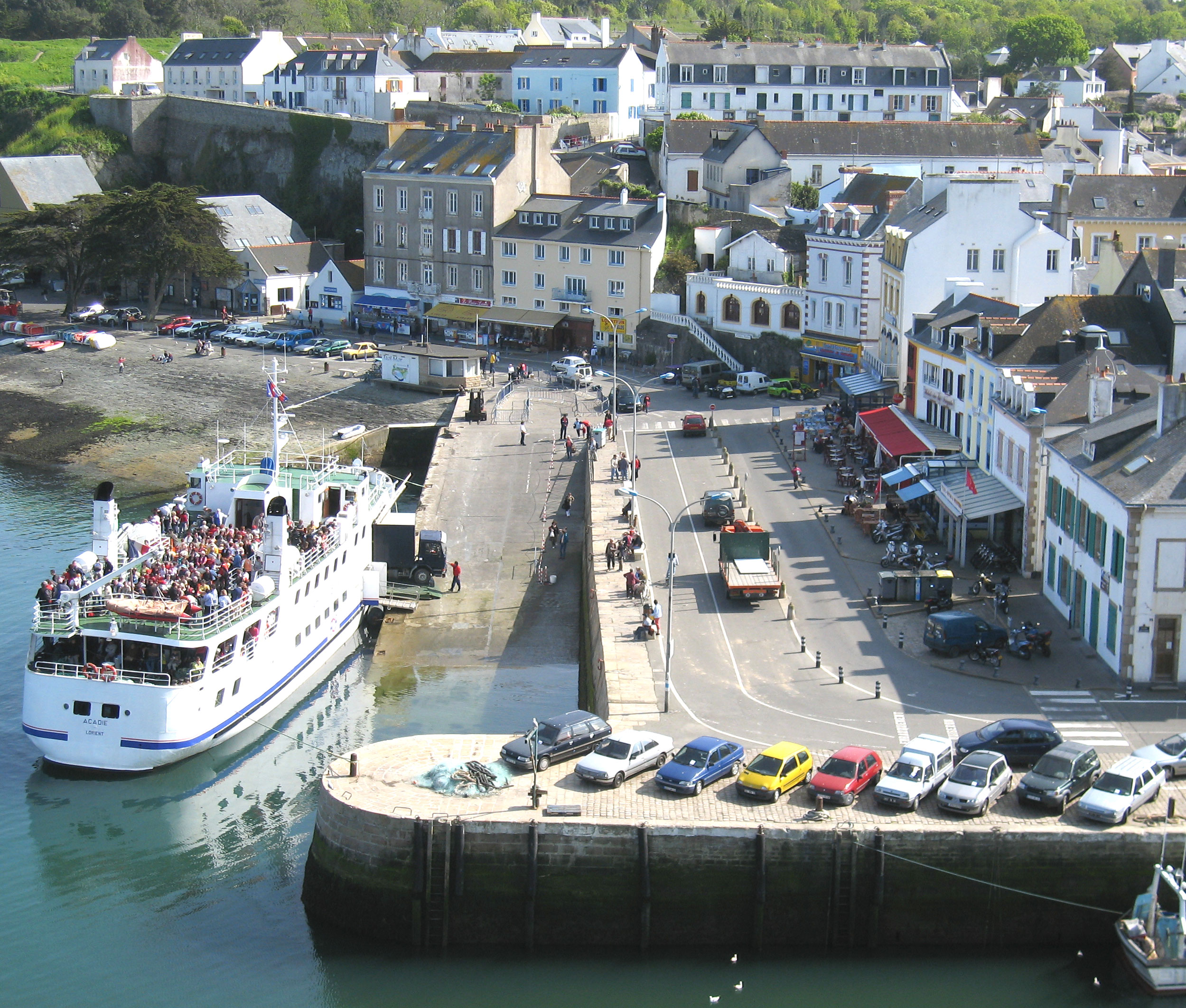
- Ferry in the harbour

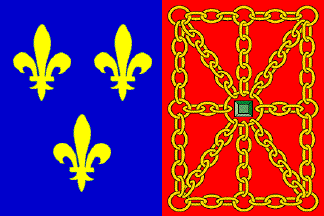
- Flag Coat of arms
- Location of Le Palais
- Location within France Location within Brittany
- Coordinates: 47°20′50″N 3°09′15″W
- Country: France
- Region: Brittany
- Department: Morbihan
- Arrondissement: Lorient
- Canton: Quiberon
- Intercommunality: Belle-Île-en-Mer

Government
  - Mayor (2026–32): Tibault Grollemund
- Area^{1}: 17.43 km^{2} (6.73 sq mi)
- Highest elevation: 58 m (190 ft)
- Lowest elevation: 0 m (0 ft)
- Population (2023): 2,599
  - Density: 149.1/km^{2} (386.2/sq mi)
- Time zone: UTC+01:00 (CET)
  - Summer (DST): UTC+02:00 (CEST)
- INSEE/Postal code: 56152 /56360
- ^{1} French Land Register data, which excludes lakes, ponds, glaciers > 1 km^{2} (0.386 sq mi or 247 acres) and river estuaries.

Le Palais (French pronunciation: [lə palɛ]; Breton: Porzh-Lae) is a commune in the Morbihan department of Brittany in northwestern France. It is one of the four communes on the island of Belle Île.

== Geography ==
Le Palais is one of the four communes of Belle île en Mer. It is the most populated. It houses the administrative center and the main port of the island. The town centre is located 4.5 km (2.8 mi) northeast of Bangor, 5.8 km (3.6 mi) southeast of Sauzon and 8 km (5.0 mi) northwest of Locmaria.

== Map ==
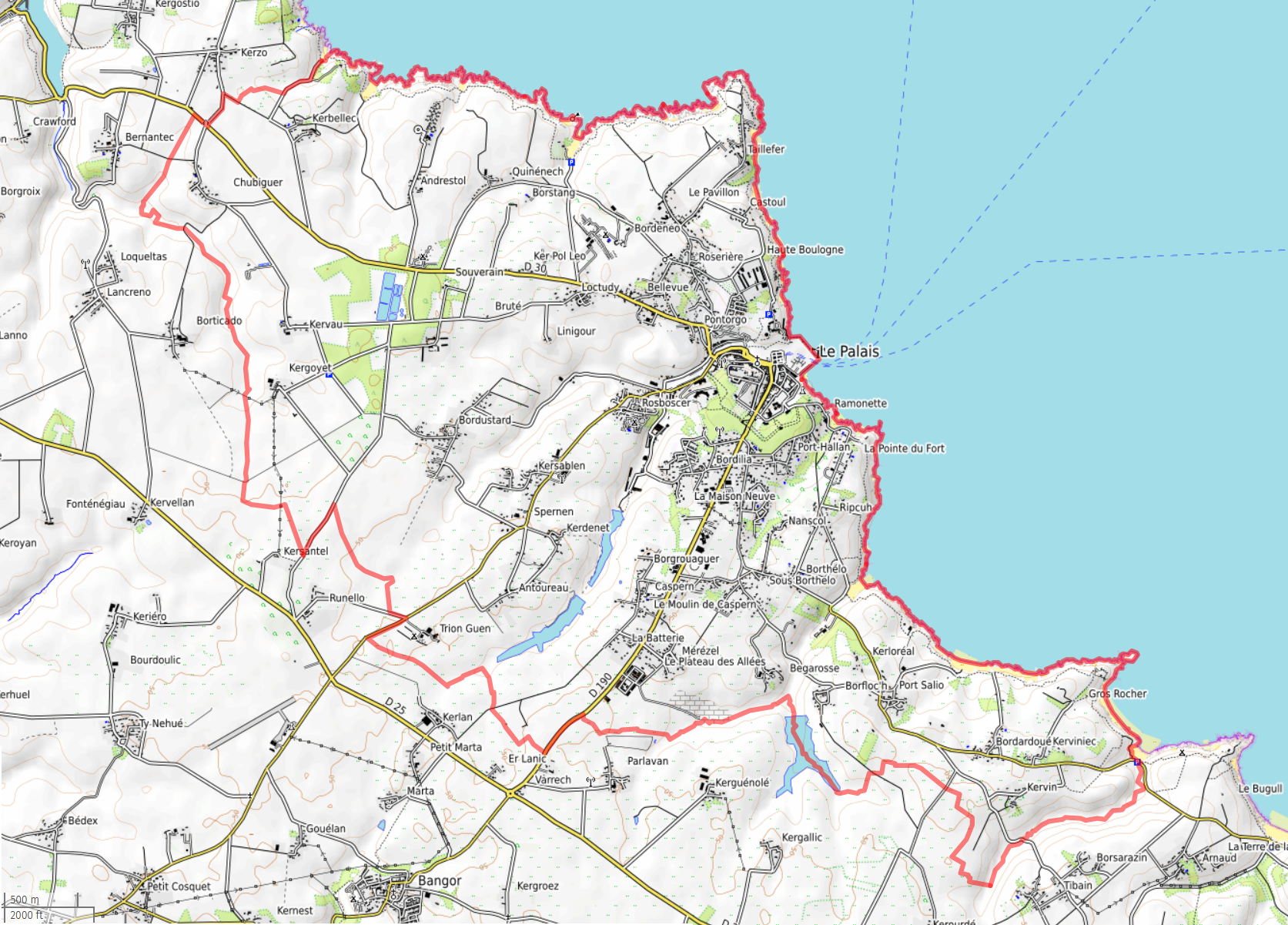
Topographic map.

== Population ==
Inhabitants of Le Palais are called in French Palantins. Le Palais's population peaked in 1872.

Historical population

Year	Pop.	±% p.a.
1793	2,504	—
1800	2,307	−1.16%
1806	3,107	+5.09%
1821	3,258	+0.32%
1831	3,584	+0.96%
1836	3,646	+0.34%
1841	4,544	+4.50%
1846	4,551	+0.03%
1851	4,972	+1.79%
1856	4,845	−0.52%
1861	4,896	+0.21%
1866	4,852	−0.18%
1872	5,456	+1.97%
1876	4,885	−2.73%
1881	4,801	−0.35%
1886	5,126	+1.32%
1891	5,113	−0.05%
1896	4,931	−0.72%
1901	4,964	+0.13%

Year	Pop.	±% p.a.
1906	4,949	−0.06%
1911	4,950	+0.00%
1921	3,185	−4.31%
1926	3,206	+0.13%
1931	2,802	−2.66%
1936	2,786	−0.11%
1946	2,208	−2.30%
1954	2,724	+2.66%
1962	2,728	+0.02%
1968	2,661	−0.41%
1975	2,634	−0.15%
1982	2,389	−1.39%
1990	2,435	+0.24%
1999	2,457	+0.10%
2007	2,522	+0.33%
2012	2,578	+0.44%
2017	2,571	−0.05%
2023	2,599	+0.18%

Source: EHESS and INSEE (1968-2023)

== See also ==
- Communes of the Morbihan department
