= Henry Moret =

French painter (1856–1913)

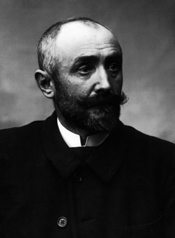
- Henry Moret (c.1890)
- Born: 12 December 1856; Cherbourg, France
- Died: 5 May 1913 (aged 56); Paris, France
- Education: École des Beaux-Arts; Académie Julian
- Known for: Painting
- Movement: Post-Impressionism; Impressionism
- Spouse: Célina Chatenet

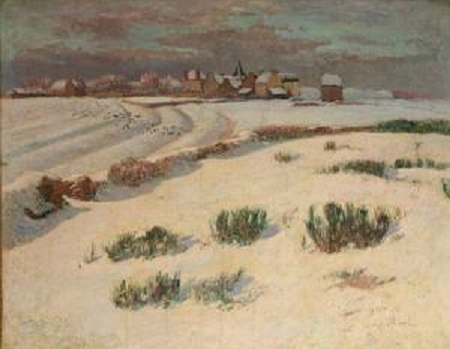
Île de Groix in the Snow (1892)

Henry Moret (French pronunciation: [ɑ̃ʁi mɔʁɛ]; 12 December 1856 – 5 May 1913) was a French Impressionist painter. He was one of the artists who associated with Paul Gauguin at Pont-Aven in Brittany. He is best known for his involvement in the Pont-Aven artist colony and his richly colored landscapes of coastal Brittany.

== Early life ==
Moret was born in Cherbourg, but little is known of his life until he began his military service in 1875. Jules La Villette, his commander in Lorient, who first noticed his artistic talents, introduced him to Ernest Corroller, a drawing teacher and marine painter. Corroller taught him the art of landscape painting as practiced by masters such as Corot and Courbet, enabling him to register at the École des Beaux-Arts in Paris where in 1876 he studied under Rudolf Lehmann, Jean-Léon Gérôme and later, from about 1880, under the history painter Jean-Paul Laurens at the Académie Julian.

== Career ==
Moret first exhibited at the Paris Salon in 1880, presenting La plage de Locqueltas à marée basse; côte de Bretagne. He maintained contacts with Corroller, often returning to Brittany. In 1888, he arrived in Pont-Aven which had begun to attract a number of artists including Ernest de Chamaillard, Émile Jourdan, and Charles Laval, with Paul Gauguin playing the leading role. Moret was one of the first painters to move to nearby le Pouldu which soon became the new centre of attraction for the Pont-Aven artists. His work began to show signs of Symbolism, probably as a result of Gauguin's influence.

After Gauguin left the area in 1891, Moret began to develop his own style. In 1895, he established a fruitful relationship with Paul Durand-Ruel who maintained a number of galleries in Paris, London, and New York, with an emphasis on Impressionism. During their relationship, Moret completed over 600 paintings, many of which were exhibited in Paris and New York, leading to a growing clientele for his work. Moret also exhibited seven of his Breton paintings at the Salon des Indépendants. After 1900, Moret became more immersed in Impressionism, applying small flecks of paint to his work rather than the broad strokes favoured by the Pont-Aven artists. Increasingly he focused on landscapes where his light effects can be seen in the sunsets and storm scenes he painted around 1909. In addition to his oils for Durand-Ruel, he also completed some 800 watercolours and drawings. He died in Paris, aged 56.

== Private life ==
In 1893, Moret met Célina Chatenet, a dressmaker whom he would eventually marry in 1910. She provided him financial support until his 1895 contract with Paul Durand-Ruel that relieved Moret of monetary concerns.

== Assessment ==
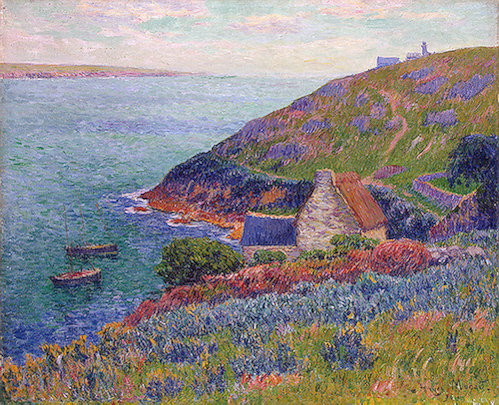
Port Manech (1896)

After initially painting in a rather classical manner, Moret's style developed under the influence of Gauguin and the Pont-Aven artists. As time went by, his works became increasingly Impressionistic, while revealing his love of nature. In Henry Moret, aquarelles et peinture 1856–1913, Maxime Maufra comments: "Coasts, forests, valleys, in every season he observed them with all his senses, reproducing them with all his spirit and sincerity." A catalogue to one of his posthumous exhibitions described how he "occupies a unique place in the evolution of art at the end of the nineteenth and the beginning of the twentieth century, as he has been able to fuse together two fundamentally opposing styles: the Syntheticism of Pont-Aven and Impressionism."

== Bibliography ==
- Cariou, André, Henry Moret: un paysagiste de l'École de Pont-Aven : [exposition], Quimper, Musée des beaux-arts, 27 juin-19 octobre 1998 (catalogue), 1998, ISBN 290673926X
- Rolland, Jean-Yves; Baranger, Marie-Bénédicte: Henry Moret, 1856–1913, Éd. Palantines (Plomelin), 2002. ISBN 2911434269.
