= Naval Hydrographic and Oceanographic Service =

Public agency in France

The Naval Hydrographic and Oceanographic Service (French: Service hydrographique et océanographique de la Marine or SHOM) is a French public establishment of an administrative nature (French: établissement public à caractère administratif) administered by the Ministry of Armed Forces. It is the successor to the Dépôt des cartes et plans de la Marine, founded in 1720 which became the Naval Hydrographic Service in 1886 and the Naval and Oceanographic Service in 1971. Its present form was set up by decree number 2007-800 on 11 May 2007. Its board is presided over by the Chief of Staff of the French Navy (French: Chef d'État-Major de la Marine) and the body is directed by a director-general.

== Aims ==
This public body has several aims, including the provision of :

- a public service in hydrography and maritime cartography, including the collection, elaboration, confirmation and spread of nautical information useful to civil or naval navigators and to all who sail for professional or pleasure, as well as those responsible for care of the coast
- to support the navy's hydrographers, oceanographers and meteorologists concerning specific information on maritime matters to ensure the optimal running of the navy's weapons systems (radar, sonar, infra-red sensors, carrier-borne aircraft etc.).

SHOM is made up of oceanographic and hydrographic groups, as well as a school, and employs 500 naval and civil personnel. Its fleet, which is placed at its disposal by the French navy, consists of 5 boats: the Beautemps-Beaupré, the Borda, the La Pérouse, the Laplace and the Pourquoi-Pas ?. SHOM works in cooperation with many other national organisations, including IFREMER (with whom it shares the Pourquoi-Pas ?), Météo-France, the CNRS, the University of Western Brittany and the IGN.

It participates in international hydrographic projects and programmes co-ordinated by the International Hydrographic Organization, of which France is a member.

== Publications ==
Among the SHOM's nautical publications are

- maritime charts in paper or electronic form ("cartes électroniques de navigation" or ENC)
- signal books, containing audio and visual signals for ship-to-ship and ship-to-shore use, as well as details of French lighthouses
- Radio signal-books, for radio-electric navigation aids and radio-communications
- nautical instructions and nautical instructions for those who sail for pleasure
- tidal almanacks and atlas of currents
- Guides and works on navigation :
  - navigator's guides
  - a guide to the symbols and abbreviations on maritime charts (1D)
  - International rules for preventing maritime accidents (Réglement international pour prévenir les abordages en mer, or RIPAM) (2A and 2B)
  - Maritime signals (3C)
- the "Groupe d'avis aux navigateurs", a weekly bulletin with corrections to the above works
- the journal Annales hydrographiques

== Directors ==
Year of appointment	Name
2019	Ingénieur en chef de l’armement Laurent Kerléguer
2010	Ingénieur général de l'armement Bruno Frachon
2005	Ingénieur général de l'armement Gilles Bessero
2000	Ingénieur général de l'armement Yves Desnoes
