= Sauzon =

Sauzon Saozon
- Commune
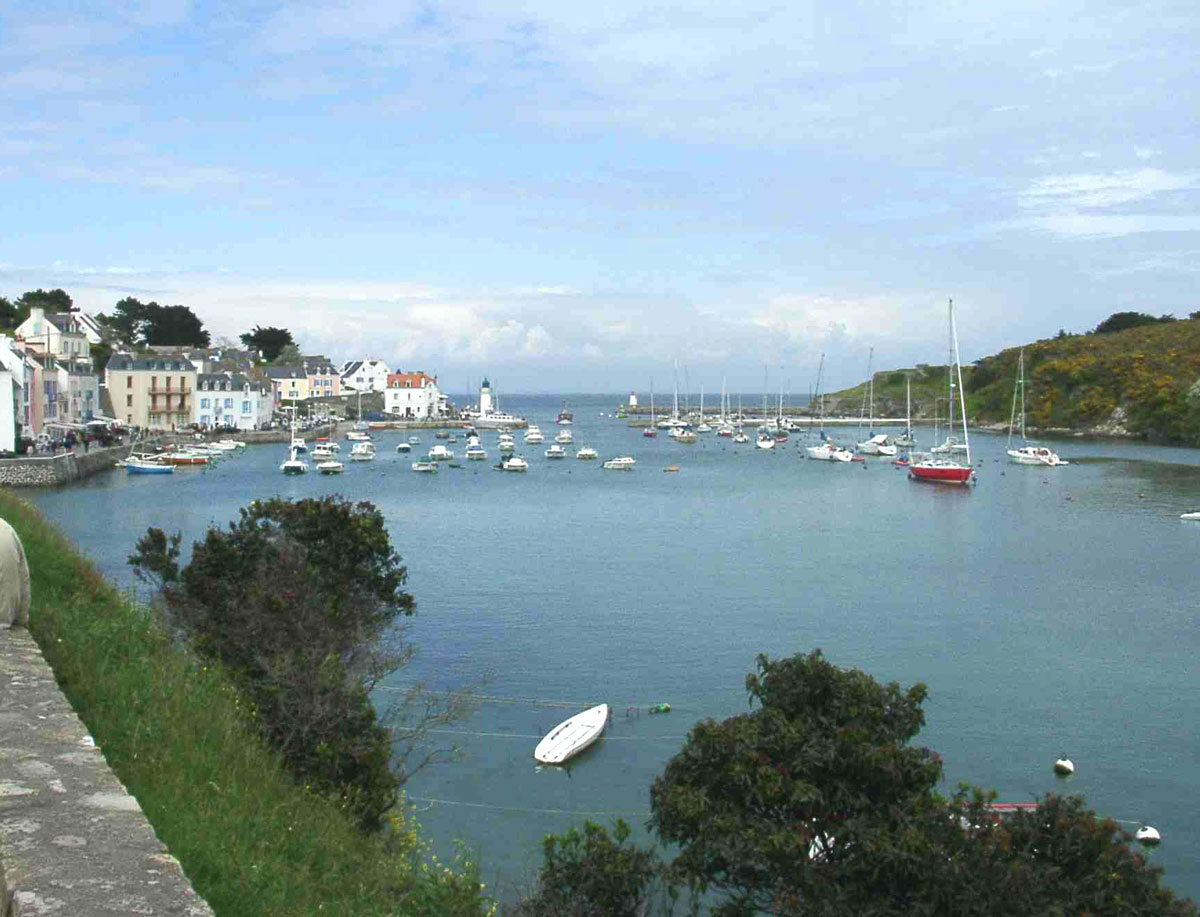
- Sauzon harbour
- Location of Sauzon
- Location within France Location within Brittany
- Coordinates: 47°22′19″N 3°13′19″W
- Country: France
- Region: Brittany
- Department: Morbihan
- Arrondissement: Lorient
- Canton: Quiberon
- Intercommunality: Belle-Île-en-Mer

Government
  - Mayor (2026–32): Ronan Juhel
- Area^{1}: 22.11 km^{2} (8.54 sq mi)
- Highest elevation: 58 m (190 ft)
- Lowest elevation: 0 m (0 ft)
- Population (2023): 1,036
  - Density: 46.86/km^{2} (121.4/sq mi)
- Time zone: UTC+01:00 (CET)
  - Summer (DST): UTC+02:00 (CEST)
- INSEE/Postal code: 56241 /56360
- ^{1} French Land Register data, which excludes lakes, ponds, glaciers > 1 km^{2} (0.386 sq mi or 247 acres) and river estuaries.

Sauzon (French pronunciation: [sozɔ̃]; Breton: Saozon) is a commune on the island of Belle Île in the Morbihan department of the region of Brittany in north-western France. Inhabitants of Sauzon are called Sauzonnais.

== Geography ==
Sauzon is one of the four communes of Belle-île en Mer. The town occupies the northwestern part of the island. The village center is located at the mouth of the Sauzon river, 5.8 km (3.6 mi) northwest of Le Palais.

== Map ==
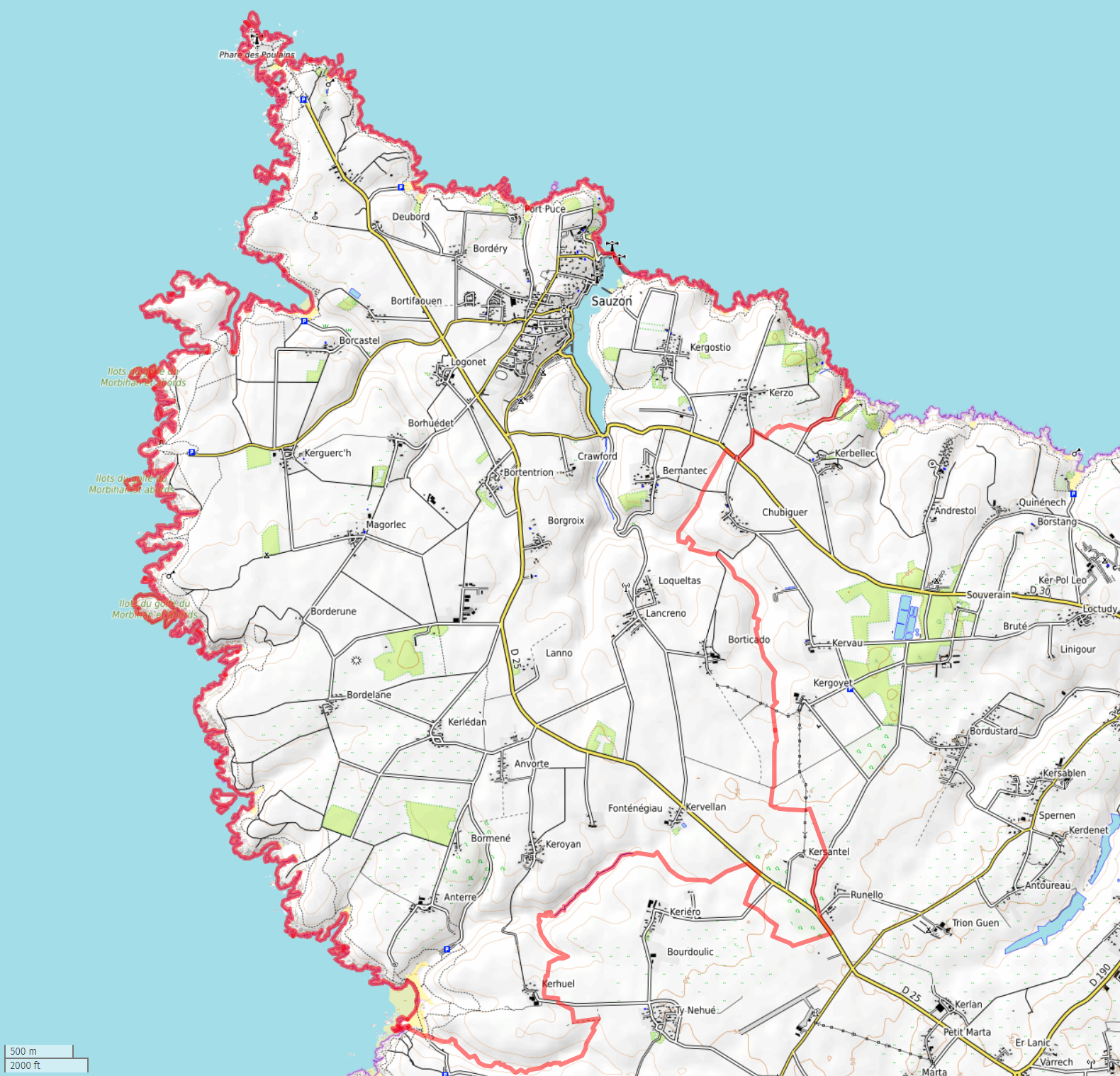
Topographic map.

== Personalities linked to the commune ==
- Sarah Bernhardt, the actress, was captivated by the natural beauty of the Pointe des Poulains at the extreme northwest of the island and stayed here regularly from 1894. Around the closed fort, she built several villas (villa Lysiane, villa des Cinq Parties du Monde) and arranged the surrounding grounds as a set of gardens integrated into the natural scenery of the place. The site was acquired by the Conservatoire du littoral and since April 2007 has been a museum dedicated to Bernhardt and the story of the preservation of the site.
- Philippe de Broca, the film director, is buried here.

== See also ==
- Communes of the Morbihan department
