= Goulphar Lighthouse =

Lighthouse in Morbihan, France

Goulphar lighthouse
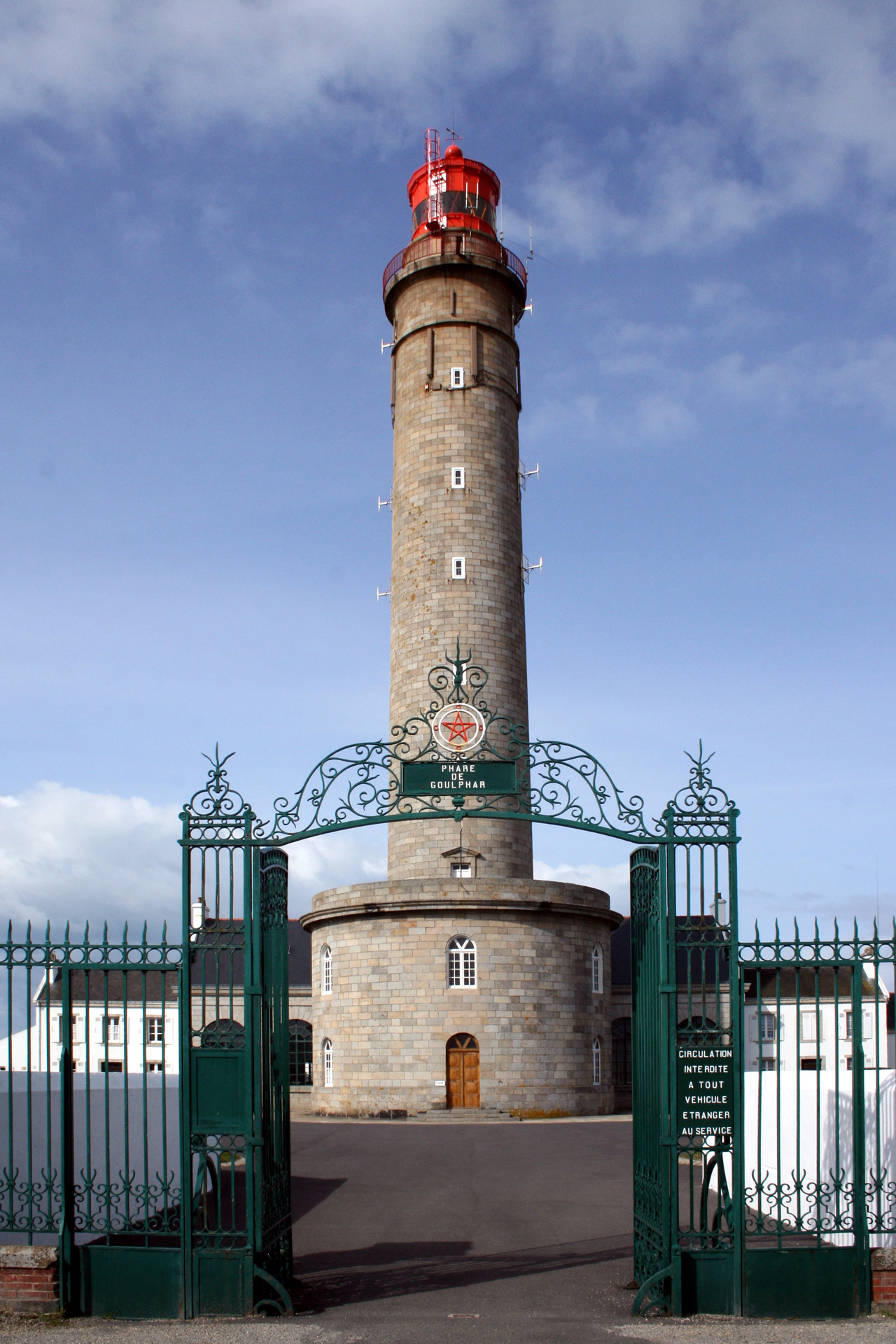
- The lighthouse in 2008
- Location: Bangor, Belle-Île-en-Mer, Morbihan, France
- Coordinates: 47°18′39.2″N 3°13′37.2″W

Tower
- Constructed: 1836
- Construction: granite tower
- Automated: 2002
- Height: 52.25 metres (171.4 ft)
- Shape: cylindrical tower with balcony and lantern
- Markings: unpainted tower, red lantern and rail
- Power source: mains electricity
- Operator: Service des phares et balises
- Heritage: monument historique inscrit, monument historique inscrit

Light
- First lit: 1835
- Focal height: 92 metres (302 ft)
- Range: 27 nautical miles (50 km)
- Characteristic: Gp.Fl.(2) W 10s
- France no.: FR-0799

The Goulphar Lighthouse (Phare de Goulphar or Grand Phare de Kervilahouen) is a lighthouse on Belle-Île-en-Mer in France. It is a granite tower combining the technical buildings and the keepers' lodgings, designed by Augustin Fresnel.

Goulphar was listed as Monument historique in 1995.

== See also ==
- List of lighthouses in France
