= PRB Sailing Team =

IMOCA 60 Team Serial Vendee Entrant

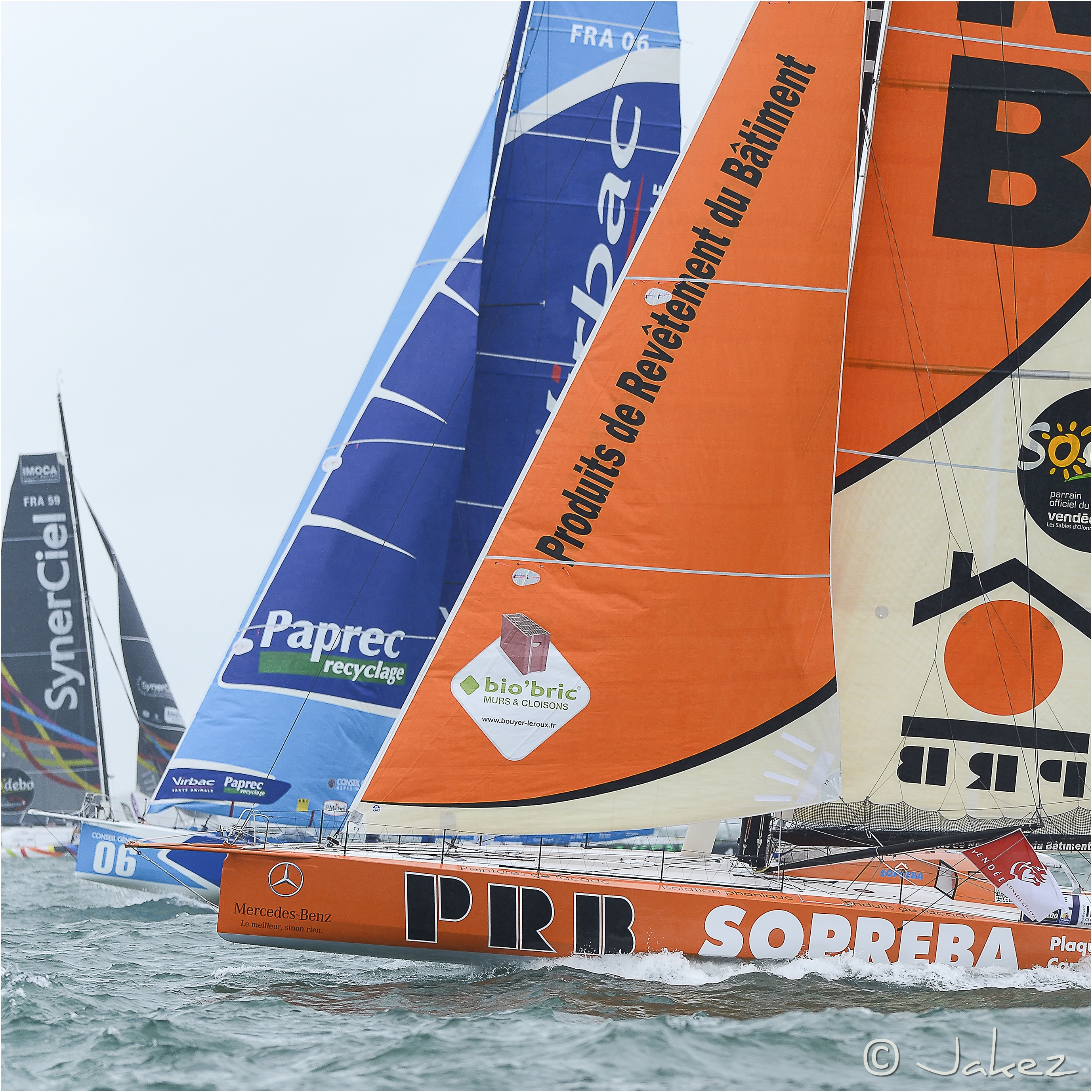
A PRB boat in 2012

The PRB Sailing Team is primarily focused on offshore round the world sailing and is the longest term sponsor of Vendée Globe competitors. The current team manager François Dubreuil.

== Round the World Race Entrants ==
Year Owned	Boat name	Class	Designer	Builder	Year built	Roud the World Races	Notes	Ref.
1992	PRB Solo Nantes / PRB-Vendee	IMOCA 60	Lucas	Chantier Alu Marine (FRA)	New Build	1992-1993 Vendée Globe		
1996-1999	PRB	IMOCA 60	Finot-Conq	Chantier Pinta (FRA)	New Build	1996-1997 Vendée Globe; 1998 Around Alone	Boat Lost	
1999-2005	PRB 2	IMOCA 60	Finot-Conq	MAG (FRA)	New Build	2000-2001 Vendée Globe; 2004-2005 Vendée Globe		
2006-2009	PRB 3	IMOCA 60	Farr	CDK (FRA)	New Build	2007 Barcelona World Race; 2008-2009 Vendée Globe		
2009-2021	PRB 4	IMOCA 60	Lauriot-Prévost / G. Verdier	CDK (FRA)	New Build	2012-2013 Vendée Globe; 2016-2017 Vendée Globe; 2020-2021 Vendée Globe	Boat Lost	
2021–Present	PRB (R36)	Rustler 36	Holman & Pye	Rustler Yachts (GBR)	1980s	**2022 Golden Globe Race**		
2022–Present	PRB 5	IMOCA 60	Verdier	Carrington Boats (GBR)	New Build	**2024-2025 Vendée Globe**		

== PRB - The sponsor ==
- Year of creation: 1975
- Head office: La Mothe-Achard, Vendée, France
- Chairman of the board: Jean-Jacques Laurent

Business activity :

- coating and flooring products for the building industry - products for façades and decoration (paint, TPC...), for tiling and soft flooring, for masonry; ranges of tiles and reconstituted stone.
- 110M turnover in 2006
- 5% in export
- 3rd biggest producer of façade rendering in France
- 16% of the French single-layer façade market (hydraulic binder)
- 500 000 tonnes of rendering per year
- No1 independent rendering manufacturer
- Staff at production site: 200 employees
- Number of sales representatives: 83
- 13 warehouses nationally
- 7 production units on the same site
