= Bernard Gallay =

Franco-Swiss yachtsman and businessman

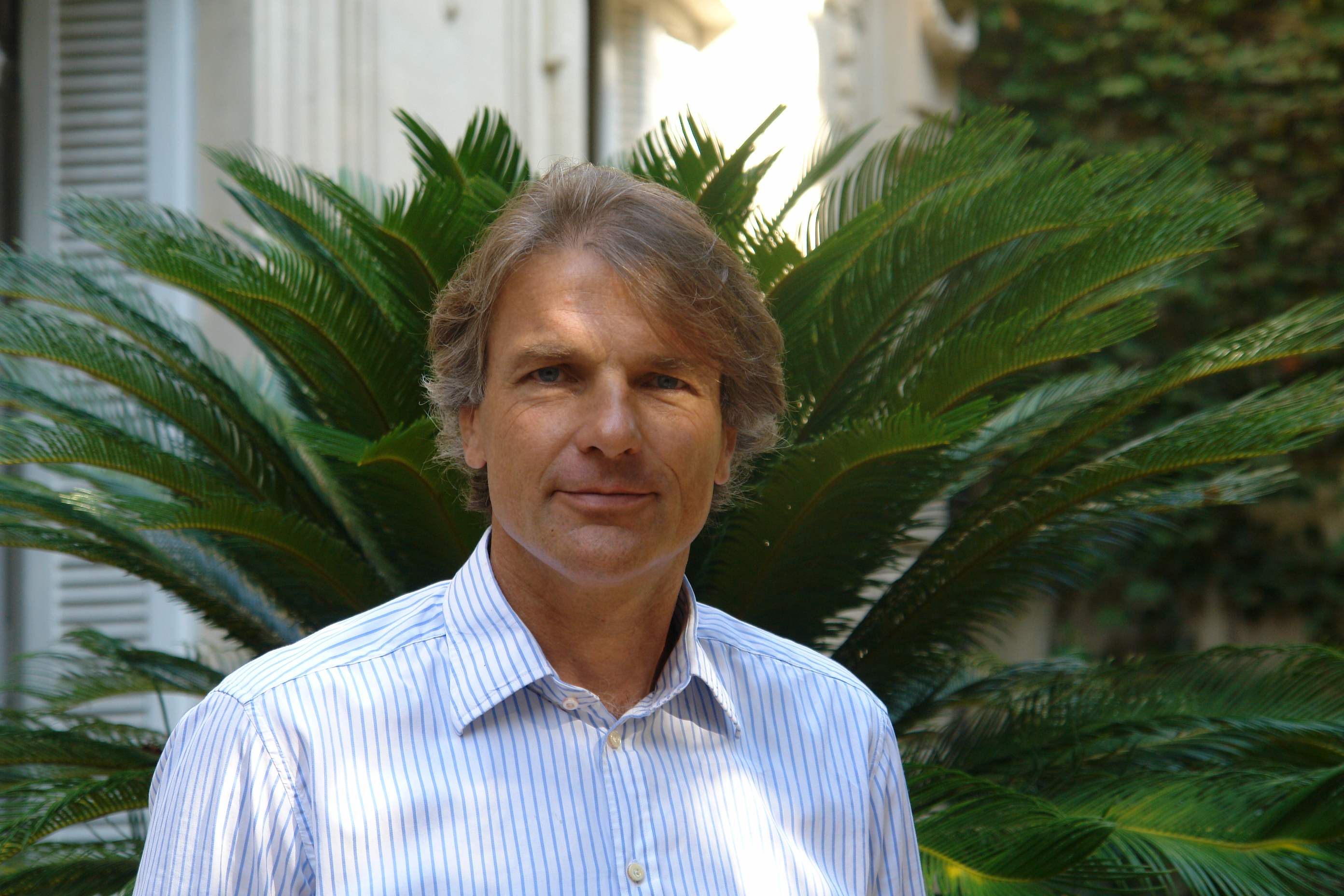
Bernard Gallay, sailor and CEO of Bernard Gallay Yacht Brokerage.

Bernard Gallay (born 7 November 1959) is a French yachtsman and businessman. He has competed in the Vendée Globe twice (1992/93 and 2000/01) and finished his career as a sailor whilst participating in the Transat 6.50 in 2005. In 1994, he moved to Montpellier in the South of France and founded Bernard Gallay Yacht Brokerage. He still competes in amateur races such as Les Voiles de Saint-Tropez (previously known as La Nioulargue) and the Rolex Middle Sea Race.

== Biography ==
Bernard Gallay was born in Paris.

=== Rugby ===
He is a former member of the France Junior Team and the France Military Bataillon de Joinville Team. He also played First Division Rugby for Racing Club de France from 1980 to 1983.

=== Sailing ===
In 1981, he started sailing by embarking on the sailing yacht Faram Serenissima at short notice for the Twostar Race, which resulted in an unfortunate shipwreck on the return leg. The following year in 1982, again at short notice, he embarked on an Atlantic crossing aboard Sea Falcon, the boat of English sailor and navigator, Sir Robin Knox-Johnston.

==== Crew racing ====
- Transat Jacques Vabre on board Voilà.Fr in 2001 and on board Afibel in 1997 (as skipper)
- Grand Prix Coralia de Fécamp on board Voilà.Fr in 2001 (as skipper)
- America's Cup on board French Kiss in 1986/87
- 3-time participant in the Tour de L'Europe on board British Airways in 1985, Ericsson in 1987 and Banque Populaire in 1999
- 11 transatlantic races or record attempts, 6 with Sir Robin Knox-Johnston
- 2-time participant in the Tour de France in 1988 with Bertrand Pacé and in 1998 as skipper
- Rolex Middle Sea Race 2011 on board Med Spirit
- Palma Super Yacht Regatta 2007 and 2009 on board Hyperion
- Saint Barth Bucket 2008 on board Hyperion
- Voiles de Saint-Tropez 2002, 2004 and 2011

==== Single-handed racing ====
- Vendée Globe in 1992/1993 on board Vuarnet Watches
- Vendée Globe in 2000/2001 on board Voilà.Fr
- 4-time participant in the Solitaire du Figaro in 1989 (winner of the newcomers class), 1990, 1991 and 1995
- Transat 6.50 in 2005 on board Fdi Groupe
- Transatlantic crossing Saint Malo – Saint Pierre and Miquelon in 1992 on board Vuarnet Watches

== Achievements ==
- Rugby: Racing Club de France from 1980 to 1983
- Vendée Globe 1993 – Abandoned (2 Stopovers due to selfsteering problems and structure of the rig). Finishes the course and brings his boat home single-handedly
- Vendée Globe 2001 – Finishes 8th (25 boats entered at the start) on board Voilà.Fr – 111 days 16 hours and 7 minutes
- America's Cup 1986–1987 – semi-final Qualifications (Louis Vuitton Cup)
- Transat Jacques Vabre 2001 – 5th with Kito De Pavant
- Transat 6.50 2005 – Finishes 14th (72 boats entered at the start) on board Bahia Express – Naval Architect was Samuel Manuard and Bernard Gallay had her built in Slovenia

== Yacht Brokerage ==
In 1994, Gallay founded the Bernard Gallay Yacht Brokerage company alongside his longtime friend, Philippe Meylan. Gallay provided through his sailing experience, knowledge of yachts and full-time involvement, while Meylan provided legal background and worked as a trusted adviser. In 1996, after two years of operation, BGYB became a member of the Mediterranean Yacht Brokerage Association (MYBA), which includes the largest international brokerage companies in the world. Its contracts and practices have become the standard for the professional yachting industry. BGYB's reputation rose through the purchase, sale, chartering, and management of motor, sailing, and racing yachts. The boats sold range from 18 to 50 meters for budgets ranging from several hundred thousand to several million Euros.
