= PRB =

PRB may refer to:

== Companies and organizations ==
- Periodic Review Board
- Population Reference Bureau
- Poudreries Réunies de Belgique, former Belgium armaments manufacturer
- PRB (company), Australian Automotive Manufacturer
- PRB, French Coatings Company
- Pre-Raphaelite Brotherhood of artists
- PRB Sailing Team
- Polish Business Council (Polska Rada Biznessu in Polish)

== Politics ==
- Brazilian Republican Party (Partido Republicano Brasileiro, in Portuguese)
- Parti Rakyat Brunei, former political party in Brunei

== Science ==
- Retinoblastoma protein, pRb, an important tumour-suppressor gene in retinoblastoma
- Progesterone receptor B

== Other uses ==
- Paso Robles Municipal Airport, IATA designation
- People’s Republic of Bangladesh
- People's Republic of Benin
- People's Republic of Bulgaria
- Permeable reactive barrier, for groundwater remediation
- Physical Review B, physics journal
- Powder River Basin, US
- PRB (vessel)
- The unofficial ISO 4217 code for the Transnistrian rubla
