= Jonathan Beckett =

British yacht broker

CEO of Burgess Yachts
- Incumbent
- Assumed office 1992
- Preceded by: Nigel Burgess

Personal details
- Born: Jonathan William Field Beckett; 25 June 1957 (age 69) Great Yarmouth, Norfolk, England
- Education: Durham University (BA)
- Occupation: Yacht broker

Jonathan William Field Beckett (born June 1957) is a British yacht broker who has been chief executive of Burgess Yachts since 1992.

== Early life and education ==
Beckett is originally from Great Yarmouth and spent his youth sailing on the Norfolk Broads. His other passion growing up was rugby union.

He graduated from Durham University in 1979 with a degree in General Arts.

== Career ==
=== Early career ===
Beckett first worked as a yacht broker in Athens with Halsey Marine. He was hired by Burgess Yachts founder Nigel Burgess in 1981, with his first major sale being the $7.5 million Sara Blue in 1984.

In 1987, Beckett brokered the sale of Nabila, originally owned by Saudi arms dealer Adnan Khashoggi, to Donald Trump. The lucrative deal put Beckett "on map", though it surprisingly turned out to be one of the quicker sales of his career. He "discreetly began informing the wealthy of the world" that the yacht was available for sale in June 1987; when Trump heard the news that September he "almost immediately" made an opening bid of $15 million in cash and eventually agreed to $30 million. This was the most expensive purchase for a superyacht at the time.

=== 1992–present ===
Following Burgess's death during the 1992–1993 Vendée Globe in 1992, Beckett succeeded him as CEO and later became majority owner of the company. He was president of the Mediterranean Yacht Brokers Association (MYBA) from 2000 to 2002, and has been president of the Large Yacht Brokers Association (LYBRA), of which he was a founding member.

In 2009, Beckett completed the sale of the Maltese Falcon for close to the asking price after a year of negotiations. He was the 2016 recipient of the Leadership Award from the International Superyacht Society.

In 2024, Beckett relocated to Miami to oversee the development of the Burgess Americas operation.

== Personal life ==
Beckett is a keen sailor and owns the sailing yacht Agapi Mas, which he has used for summer cruising with family and friends. His other interests include tennis and watching rugby.
