= Tour de Belle-Île =

The Tour de Belle-Ile is a nautical event created in 2008 by eol (French sports marketing company) and open to all sailing yachts measuring 6,50m or more.

The Tour de Belle-Ile measures around 41 nautical miles: starting from the middle of the bay of Quiberon (Brittany, France), rounding of Belle Île leaving the island to port and returning to the departure/finish line.

During the event, which takes place traditionally on the weekend of 8 May, the tent village of the race is put up on the harbour of La Trinité-sur-Mer.

The special feature of this event is to welcome professional skippers as well as amateur sailors who are not used to take part in sailing races.

The Tour de Belle-Ile brought together 115 sailing yachts in 2008, 281 in 2009, 329 in 2010 and 486 in 2011, becoming the first sailing race in France (in terms of number of boats participating) ahead of the Spi Ouest France and Les Voiles de Saint-Tropez.

In 2011, the round of the race is modified and the yachts have to sail via the channel of La Teignouse on the way out and on the way back, due to environmental obligation.

In 2011, the organisation rewarded the 1st monohull of the scratch ranking with a special prize, the trophy Michel Malinovsky. This trophy pays tribute to Michel Malinovsky, who was famous for his 2nd position in the Route du Rhum 1978 on his monohull Kriter V, 98 seconds behind Mike Birch on a small multihull, and died in August, 2010.

The Tour de Belle-Ile has a reputation to be the French equivalent of Round the Island Race.

== List of winners ==
- 2008 : Anne Caseneuve (croisières Anne Caseneuve), 6 h 48 min and 24 sec
- 2009 : Francis Joyon (IDEC), 8 h 34 min and 19 sec
- 2010 : Yves Le Blevec (ACTUAL), 3 h 24 min and 52 sec
- 2011 : Sébastien Josse (Gitana 11), 2 h 42 min and 00 sec
- 2011 : Trophy Michel Malinovski : Franck Cammas (Groupama 70), 3 h 23 min and 14 sec
