= Thierry Arnaud =

French offshore yachtsman (born 1960)

Personal information
- Nationality: French
- Born: 64–65
- Occupation: Offshore Sailor

Thierry Arnaud born 1960 is a former French offshore sailor. He took part in the first ever Mini Transat race which ran from Brest in France to Pointe à Pitre in 1985 held in the Mini Transat 6.50 racing a custom prototype boat built Pichavent shipyard in moulded wood. He went on to entre the 1992-1993 Vendée Globe on the IMOCA 60 named after it sponsor "Le Monde informatique". As the boat was only launched two months before departure, a defect in the fastening the boats ballast made the boat have to retiring unaided.
