= Alain Gautier =

French navigator

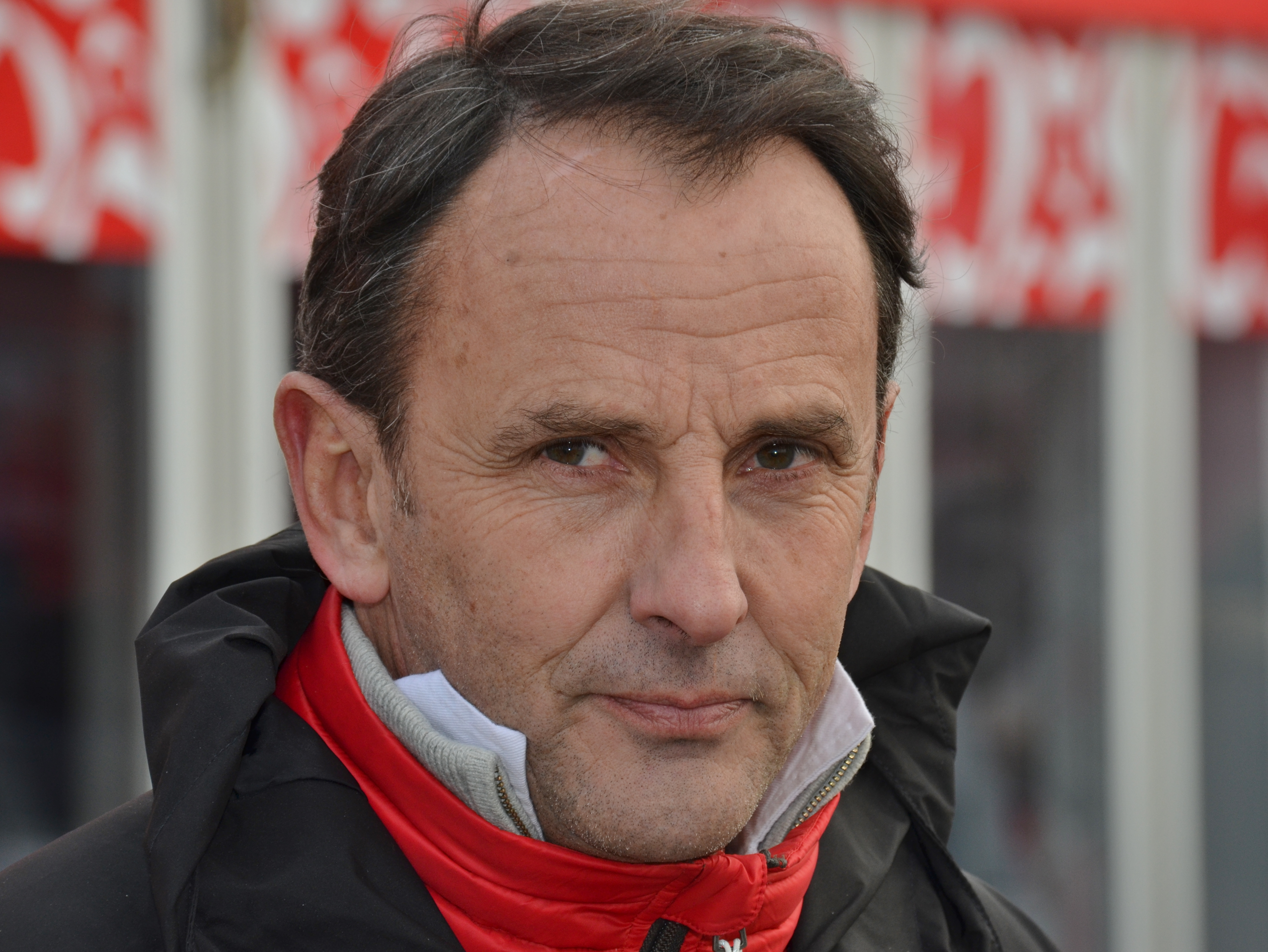

Personal information
- Nationality: French
- Born: 8 May 1962 (age 64) Lorient, France

Sailing career
- Sport: Sailing
- Class: IMOCA 60

Alain Gautier (born 8 May 1962, in Lorient) is a French professional offshore sailor. He is best known for winning the 1992–1993 Vendée Globe. He currently heads Lanic Sport Development, founded in 1989, and specializing in the preparation of and assistance to offshore racing teams including those of Ellen MacArthur in 1998 and Isabelle Joschke in 2019. He headed with Bertrand Pacé the Aleph challenge for the 34th America's Cup in 2013 but the team never got the funding required. It competed in the America's Cup World Series on supplied AC45 catamarans before withdrawing.

== Results ==
1983:
Solitaire du Figaro, winner of the first leg
4th of La Baule-Dakar in crew with Loïc Peyron
1987:
6th of the Solitaire du Figaro, winner of the last stage
1989:
Winner of the Solitaire du Figaro
6th in the Vendée Globe on Generali Concorde

1990:
2nd in the BOC Challenge on Generali Concorde

1991:
Winner of La Baule-Dakar (monohull) on Fleury Michon X

1992:
Winner of the Vendée Globe in 110 days on Superior Baggage

1994:
4th of the Route du Rhum6 on Superior Baggage

1996:
Winner of the Transat AG2R with Jimmy Pahun on Broceliande

1998:
2nd of the Route du Rhum on Brocéliande

1999-2001:
Wins several Grand Prix with the trimaran Foncia (including the Cherbourg-Tarragona Global Assistance Challenge on 23/05/2001)

2003:
2nd of the Solitaire du Figaro7 9th of the Transat Jacques-Vabre with Ellen MacArthur

2006:
7th of the Route du Rhum on the ORMA Foncia.
