= IMOCA 60 PRB (1991) =

Sailboat

Development
- Designer: Paul Lucas
- Year: August 1991
- No. built: One Off
- Builders: Alu Marine and J.Y. Hasselin

Boat
- Displacement: 12,500 kg (27,600 lb)
- Draft: 3.60 m (11.8 ft)

Hull
- Type: Monohull
- Construction: Aluminium
- LOH: 18.28 m (60.0 ft)
- LWL: 17.60 m (57.7 ft)
- Beam: 5.25 m (17.2 ft)

Hull appendages
- General: Boat has a forward canard
- Ballast: 4,800 kg (10,600 lb) Fixed Keel; 2x2000 ltrs of Water Ballast

Rig
- General: by Marechal
- Rig type: Alloy Masthead Sloop Rig

Sails
- Upwind sail area: 220 m^{2} (2,400 sq ft)
- Downwind sail area: 500 m^{2} (5,400 sq ft)

Racing
- Class association: IMOCA 60

The IMOCA 60 class yacht Solo obtained sponsorship and became PRB - Solo Nantes was designed by Paul Lucas and launched in the August 1991 after being built by Alu Marine, France.

== Racing results ==
| Pos | Year | Race | Class | Boat name | Skipper | Notes | Ref |
Round the world races
| 7 / 14 | 1993 | 1992–1993 Vendée Globe | IMOCA 60 | PRB - Solo Nantes | Jean-Yves Hasselin (FRA) | 153 days | |
Transatlantic Races
| 10 / 24 | 1994 | Route du Rhum | IMOCA 60 | PRB - Vendee | Jean-Yves Hasselin (FRA) | 21d 19h | |
Other Races
