= The Pyramides at Port-Coton, Rough Sea =

1886 painting by Claude Monet

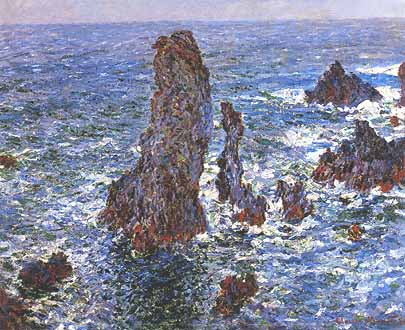
- The Moscow version
- Artist: Claude Monet
- Year: 1886
- Medium: oil on canvas
- Dimensions: 65 cm × 81 cm (26 in × 32 in)
- 47.30520°N 3.23803°W

The Pyramides at Port-Coton, Rough Sea is a series of six paintings produced by Claude Monet in 1886. They all show the rocky Atlantic coast of Belle-Île-en-Mer, visited and painted in the plein air by the artist between 12 September and 25 November that year.

Today, The Pyramides at Port-Coton paintings are in collections around the world, including the Pushkin Museum in Moscow, the Museo de Arte Contemporáneo de Caracas, Ny Carlsberg Glyptotek, the Rau Collection for UNICEF / Arp Museum Bahnhof Rolandseck, and private collections.

== Context ==
During the late 1880s, Post-Impressionist painters like Seurat and Pissarro were gaining popularity with alternative painting techniques, challenging the methods of Impressionist painters such as Monet. It is in this time that Monet decided to depart from the gentle scenery often exemplified in Impressionist works and travel to the dramatic site of Belle Isle in order to prove his worth as a leading modern artist.

Monet arrived in the island's main town, Le Palais, on September 12, 1886. He immediately traveled to the côte sauvage (wild coast) on the Atlantic, which held several sites he would eventually paint, including Port-Coton. He originally planned on staying for only a fortnight, but after delaying his departure multiple times, he ended up staying for about two and a half months, departing on November 25.

Monet often struggled with the poor weather during his stay, but he wrote in one of his letters to his wife Alice that "one needed no sun for lugubrious effects". In another one of his letters, he described the coast as "sinister, diabolical and magnificent". Monet focused on a formalized process of serial practice during his stay, the most extensive he had attempted until beginning the Haystacks series in the late 1880s.

== Description and analysis ==
In the six paintings of The Pyramides of Port-Coton, Monet presents the light and sky under a variety of conditions including clear midday, mist, partial cloud cover, and the warm light of the late afternoon. The ocean appears in similarly varied states between calm and stormy waters. The series exemplifies how Monet greatly limited his number of motifs while on the island. All six paintings portray the same rock formations from the same angle and in a very similar format. These characteristics distinguish Monet's series from previously repeated subjects like in the Gare Saint-Lazare group which included more variation in points of view and format. These limitations not only resulted in images that are near-replicas, but according to Paul Tucker, they "forced him to be even more exacting in his description of natural phenomena—the action of the sea, the way the light danced upon the water, or the interplay of shadows and reflections cast by the craggy black rocks—subtle differences" that can be observed between the series paintings. David Clarke, a professor in the Department of Fine Arts at the University of Hong Kong, states that the Port-Coton series paintings fall under Monet's "exploration of water's ability to connote personal emotional states". Specifically, the dominance of water over the rocks is portrayed through only isolated fragments of rock being visible, "which are represented visually in a fluid or flame-like way".

== Exhibition and reception ==
=== Initial exhibition ===
The series was first shown at the Sixth Annual International Exhibition held at George Petit's in the Spring of 1887. The series was presented together within a group of ten paintings from Belle-Île, which was more extensive than his previous displays of series. The series was then presented to the public again within a group of thirteen paintings at the Monet-Rodin exhibition in 1889 also at George Petit's.

=== Critic reactions ===
Gustave Geffory, one of Monet's critical supporters and eventual biographer, gave a very positive review of Monet's work at the exhibition at Georges Petit in 1887, praising Monet's attention to color relationships. This marked the first time in Monet's career that the critical majority was positive towards his work, with one writer calling Monet "the most significant landscape painter of modern times". Critics also emphasized the relevance of Monet's long stay on the island through harsh conditions.

== Current locations ==
The paintings in the series were eventually split up into different museums and private collections, summarized in the table below.

Image	Title	Museum	City	Dimensions (cm)	Year	Catalogue number
	The Pyramides at Port-Coton, Rough Sea	Pushkin Museum	Moscow	65 × 81	1886	W1084
	The Pyramides at Port-Coton	Museo de Arte Contemporáneo de Caracas	Caracas	65.5 × 81.5	1886	W1085
	The Rocks at Belle-Île	Ny Carlsberg Glyptotek	Copenhagen	65 × 81	1886	W1086
	The Pyramides at Port-Coton, Rainy Weather	Rau Foundation for UNICEF, Arp Museum – Rolandseck railway station	Rolandseck, near Remagen	65.5 × 65.5	1886	W1087
	The Pyramides at Port-Coton, Sun Effect	Private collection		65 × 65	1886	W1088
	The Rocks at Belle-Île	Private collection			1886	W1089

== Related works ==
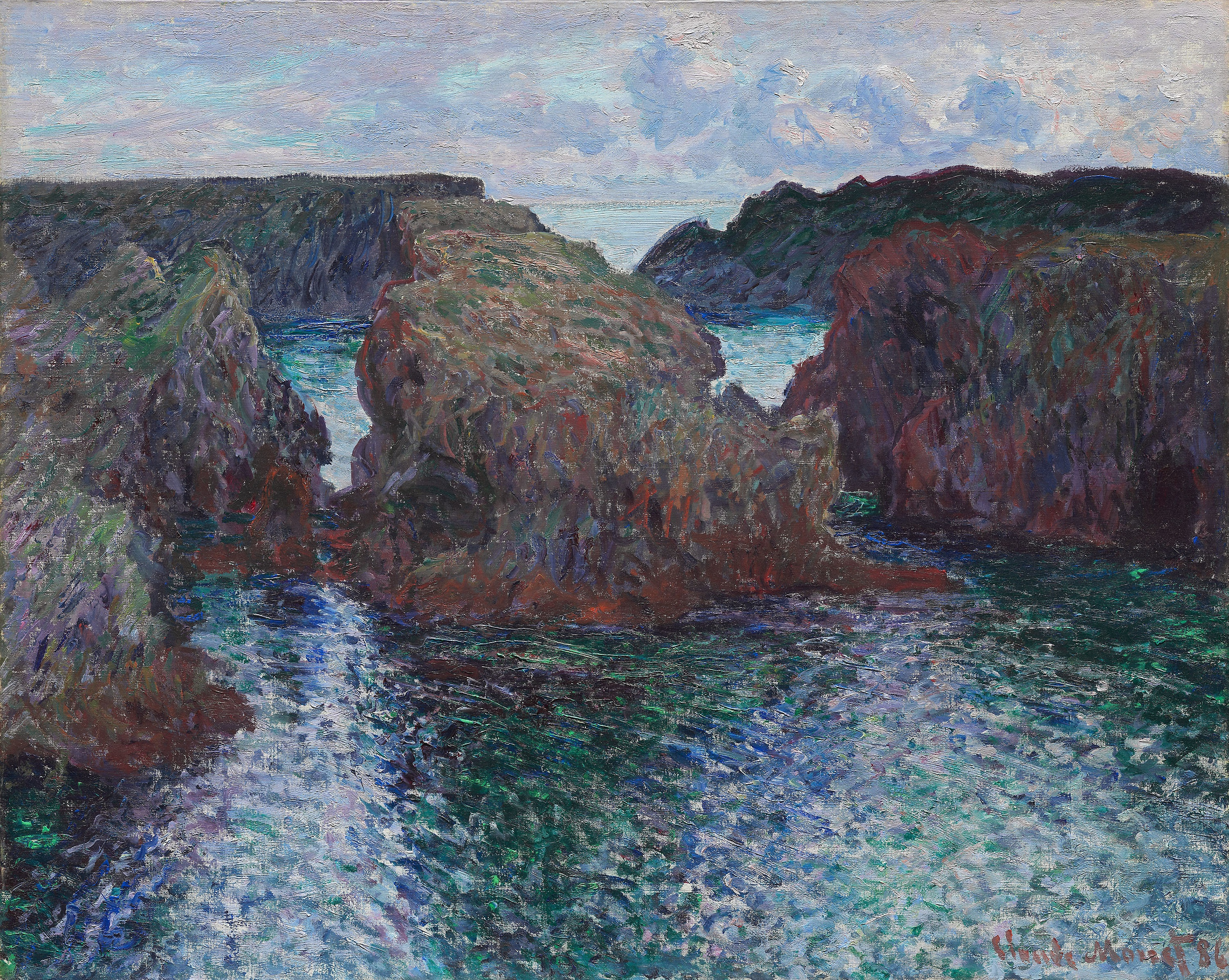
Landscape at Port-Goulphar (1886), Art Institute of Chicago.

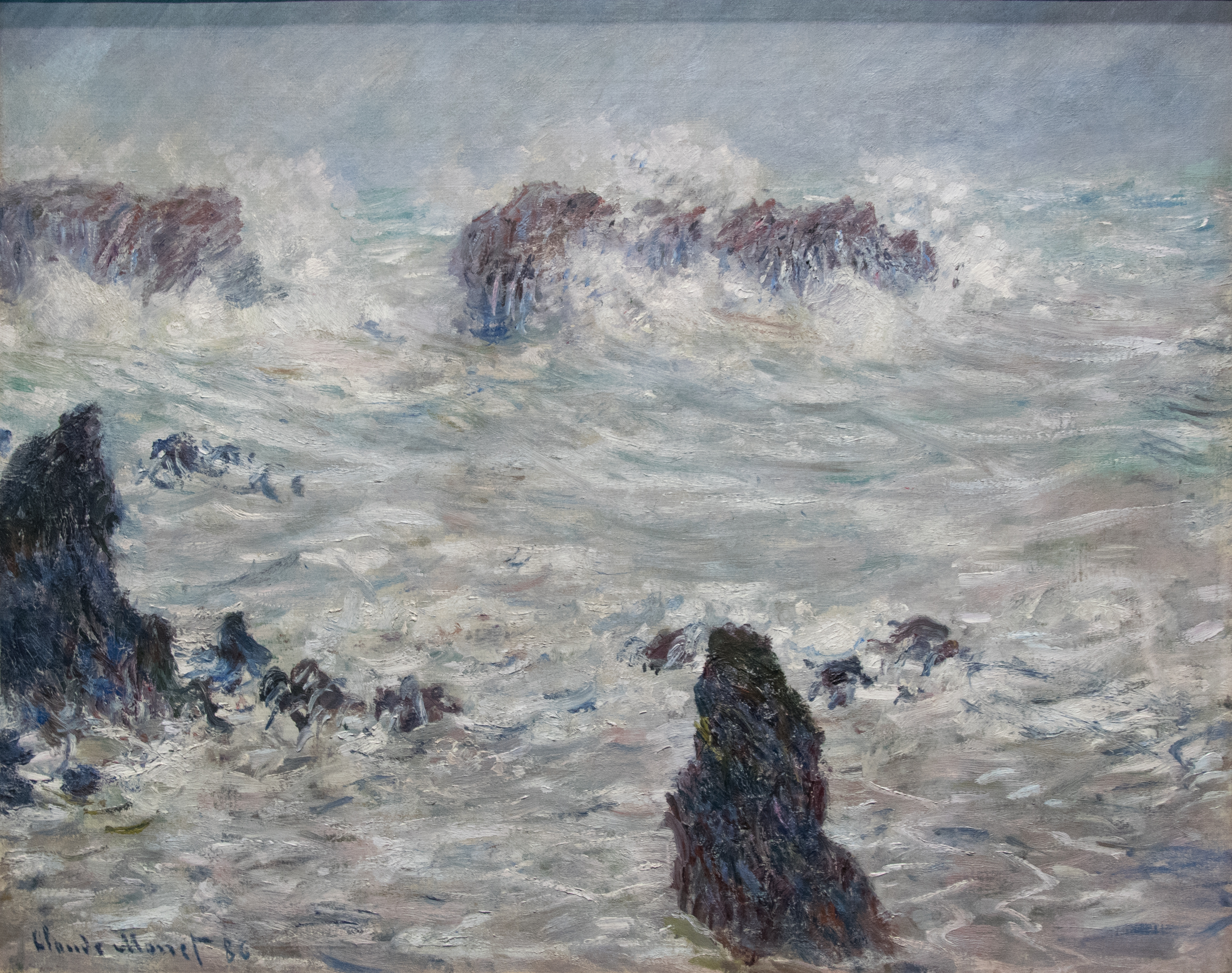
Tempest off the Coast of Belle-Île (1886), Musée d'Orsay.

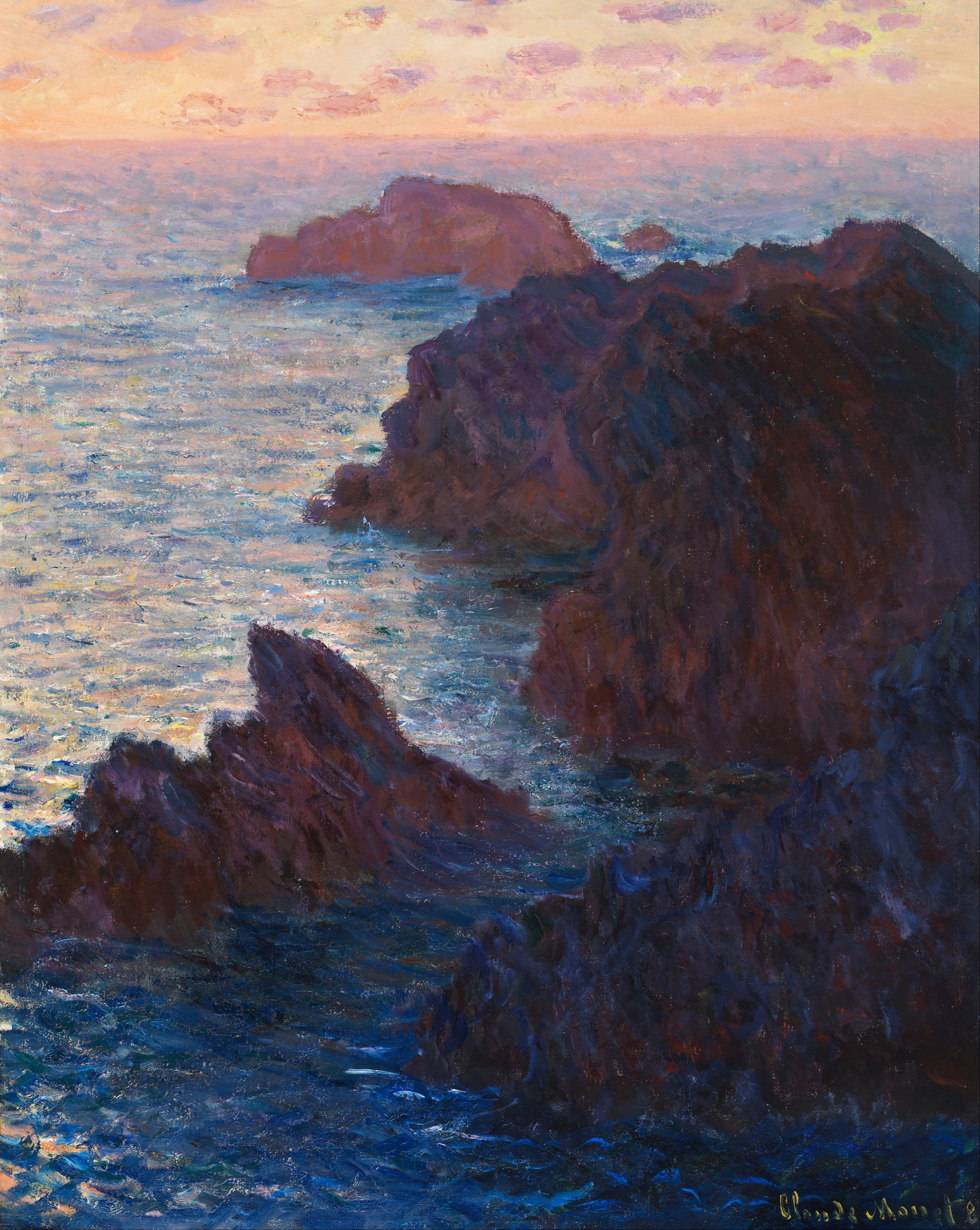
Rocks at Belle-Île, Port-Domois (1886), Cincinnati Art Museum

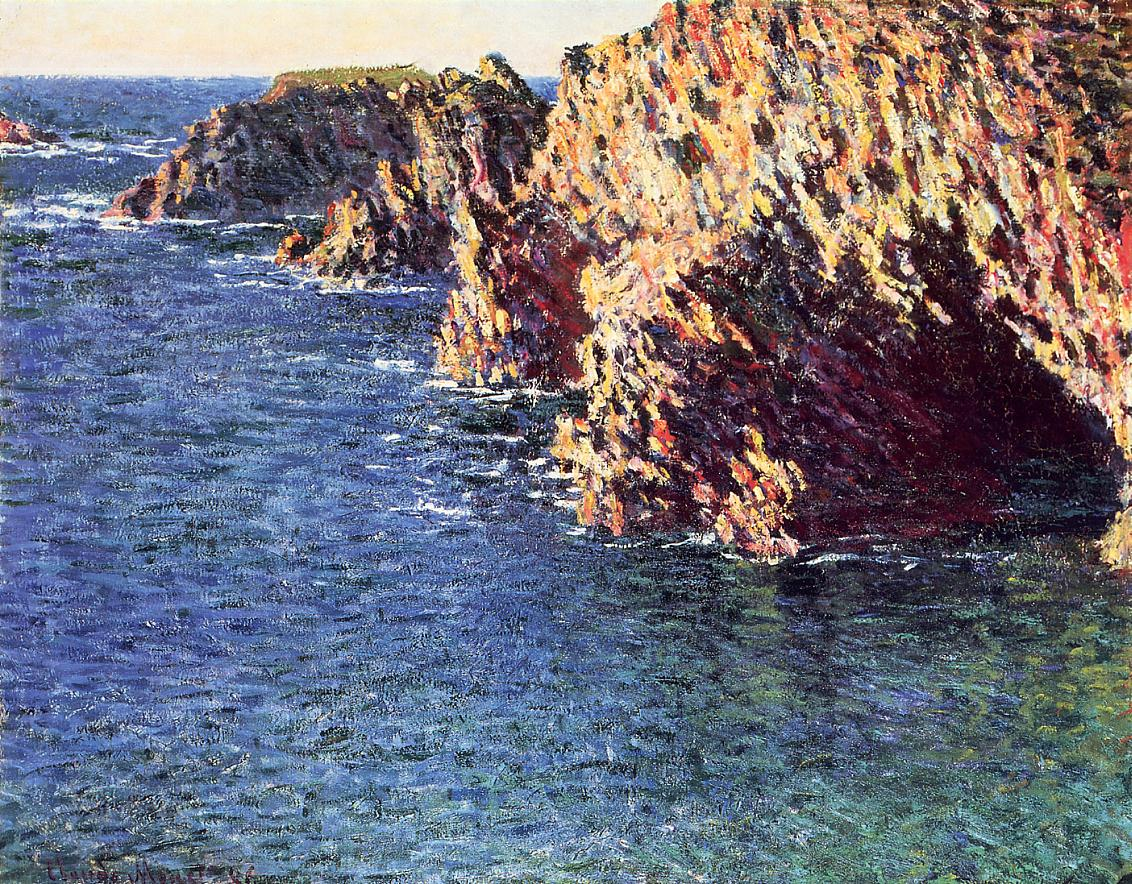
Grotto at Port-Domois (1886), Museum of Modern Art, Ibaraki

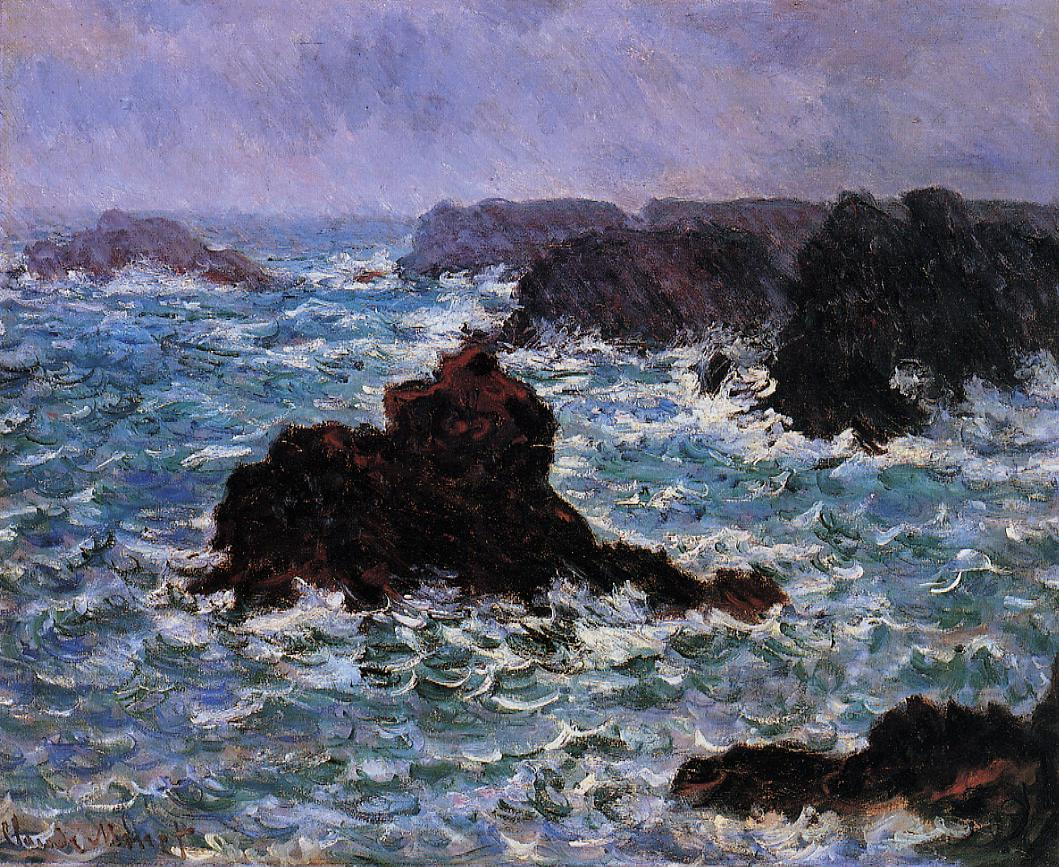
Belle-Île, Effect of Rain (1886), Bridgestone Museum of Art

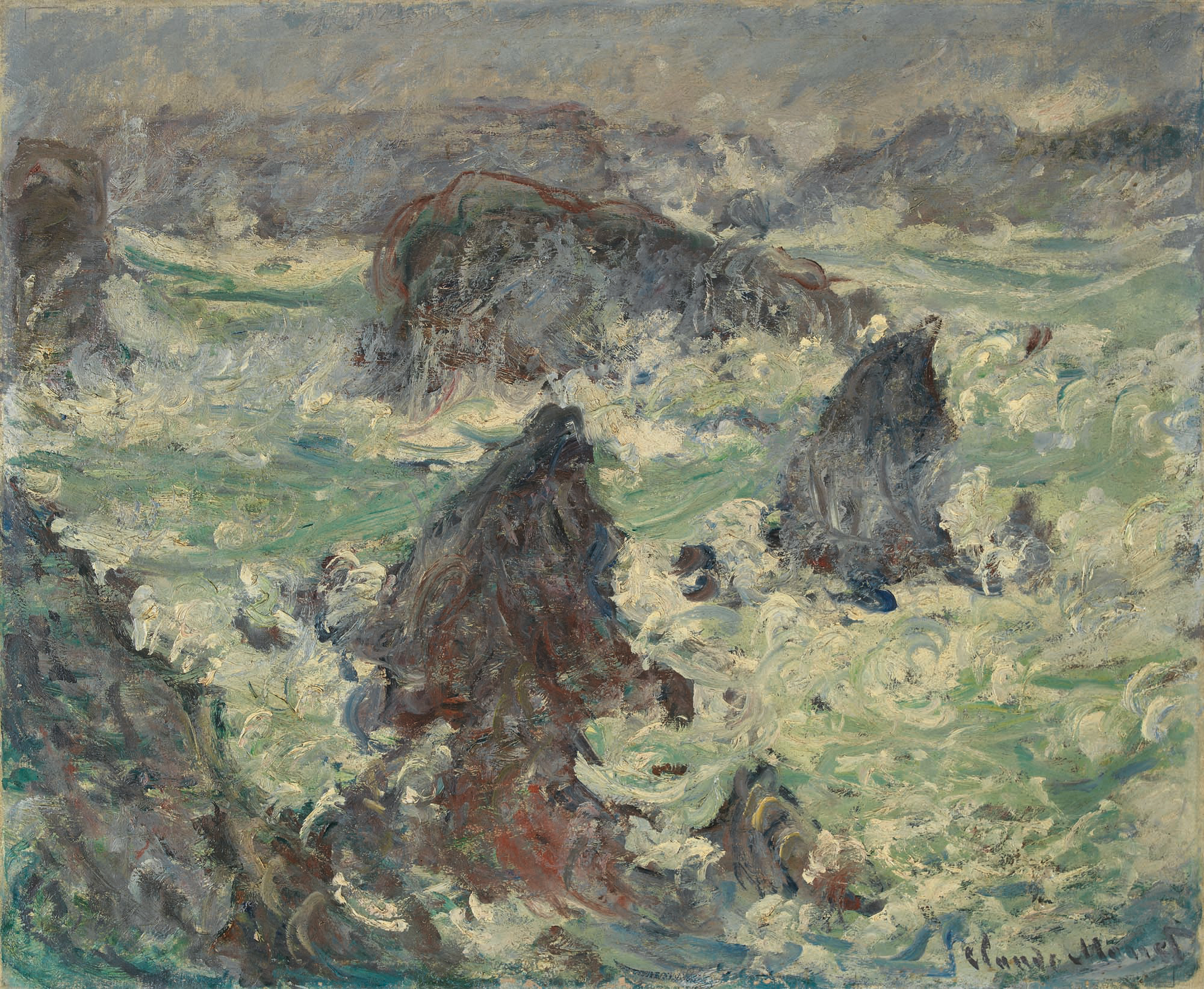
Tempest on the Coasts of Belle-Île (1886), Galerie Kornfeld

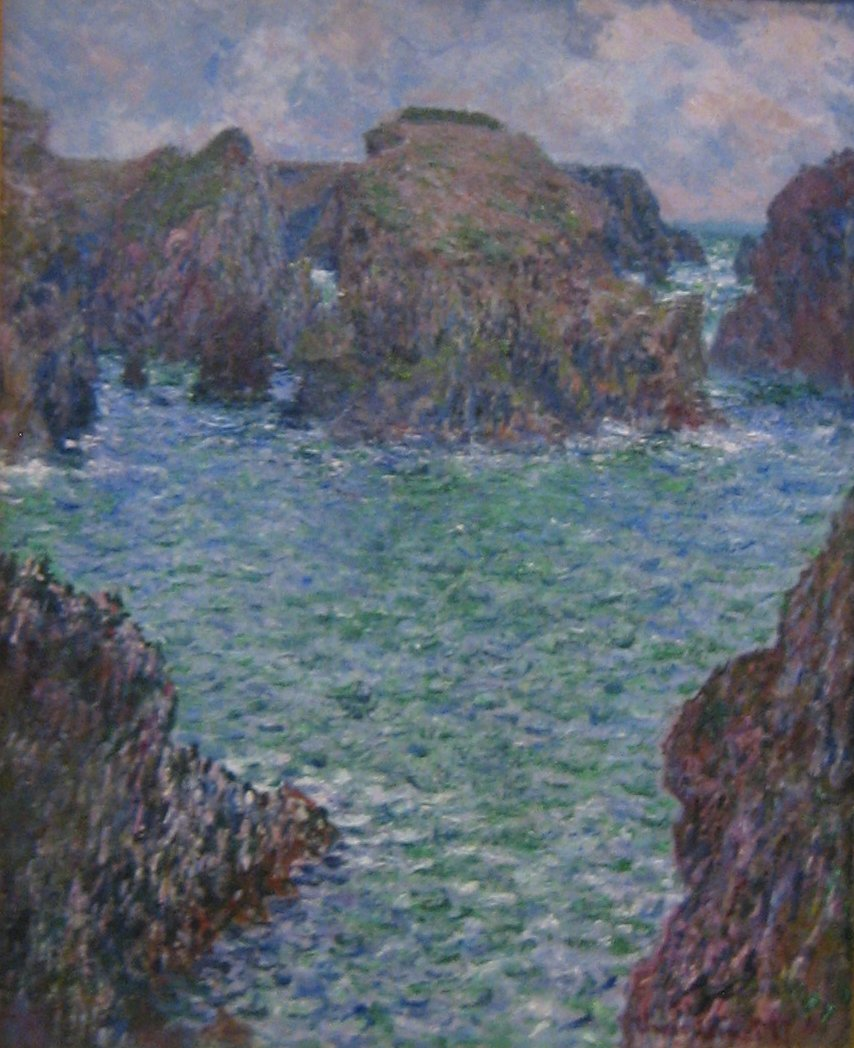
Port-Goulphar, Belle-Île (1887), Art Gallery of New South Wales

== See also ==
- List of paintings by Claude Monet
