= Homefield Preparatory School =

Location
- Western Road; Sutton, Greater London, SM1 2TE; United Kingdom; 51°21′45″N 0°12′10″W

Information
- Other name: HPS
- Type: Private preparatory day school
- Established: 1870
- Local authority: Sutton London Borough Council
- Department for Education URN: 103015 Tables
- Headmaster: Mrs Anderson https://www.homefield.sutton.sch.uk/about-homefield/heads-welcome
- Head teacher: Gemma Anderson
- Gender: Boys
- Age range: 3–11
- Enrolment: 331 (2019)
- Capacity: 420
- Houses: Bomfords, Walfords, Greys, Ellis
- Website: www.homefield.sutton.sch.uk

Homefield Preparatory School (or simply Homefield) is a 3–11 private boys preparatory day school in Sutton, Greater London, England established in 1870.

In the early years of its history, it was described as "A Preparatory School for the Sons of Gentlemen” and as giving “carefully graduated preparation for Public Schools and Royal Navy, either on the classical or on the modern side”.

== Site development ==
As part of the 150th anniversary of the school in 2020, construction started on new developments for the school, including a new block of eight classrooms, a double level performance hall and dining room, new music and ICT facilities, a library hub and an all-weather sports pitch.

The £7 million project will have multiple eco-friendly features including solar panels, low-energy underfloor heating and a green roof. 10% more green space is expected to be gained.

== Notable alumni ==
- David Balcombe, English cricketer
- Ben Barnes, actor
- Nigel Burgess, businessman and single-handed yachtsman
- Colin Cowdrey, ex England Cricket Captain (after whom the Cowdrey Building is named)
- Kenneth Mason, Himalayan explorer and first statutory Professor of Geography at Oxford University
- John Rae, former headmaster of Westminster School (after whom the Rae Building is named)
- Charlie Sharples, English rugby player
- Graham Sutherland, a painter, an etcher and a designer (after whom the Sutherland Building is named)
