= José Luis Ugarte =

Spanish skipper and navigator

Personal information
- Nationality: Spanish
- Born: 6 November 1928; Getxo
- Died: 27 July 2008 (aged 79)

Sailing career
- Class: IMOCA 60

José Luis Ugarte, born in Getxo, Spain on 6 November 1928, died on 27 July 2008 was a Spanish sailor who competed in the second Vendée Globe Race, finishing 6th 1992–1993 Vendée Globe. At 64 he was the oldest competitor to partake in the race, a record broken by Rich Wilson (USA) in the 2016 race at the age of 66.
