= Alan Wynne-Thomas =

British sailor (1941–2008)

Alan Wynne-Thomas, born in 1941 in Carmarthen, Wales, and died on 28 September 2008, was a British offshore sailor and navigator. He crossed the Atlantic eleven times, three of them solo.

== Biography ==
After graduating from the London School of Economics, he set up his own successful company specializing in health software. He played rugby, successively in the clubs of Maesteg, Saracens F.C. and Otago.

In 1992, he took part in the English Transat, which he finished in third place in the category of monohull and seventh in the general classification. That same year, he competed in the second edition of the 1992–1993 Vendée Globe aboard his yacht Cardiff Discovery. Between the Kerguelen Islands and Heard Island, his boat capsized, but righted itself, he fell and thought he had broken his ribs. He gave up and slowed down in Hobart, where an X-ray revealed that six of his ribs were actually broken.

== Personal life ==
He married first time with Margaret with whom he had two children Rhian and Rhidian. He then married Jill who gave him two daughters Ellen and Isla. He died of cancer at the age of 67.
