= Locmaria =

Commune in Brittany, France

Locmaria Lokmaria-ar-Gerveur
- Commune
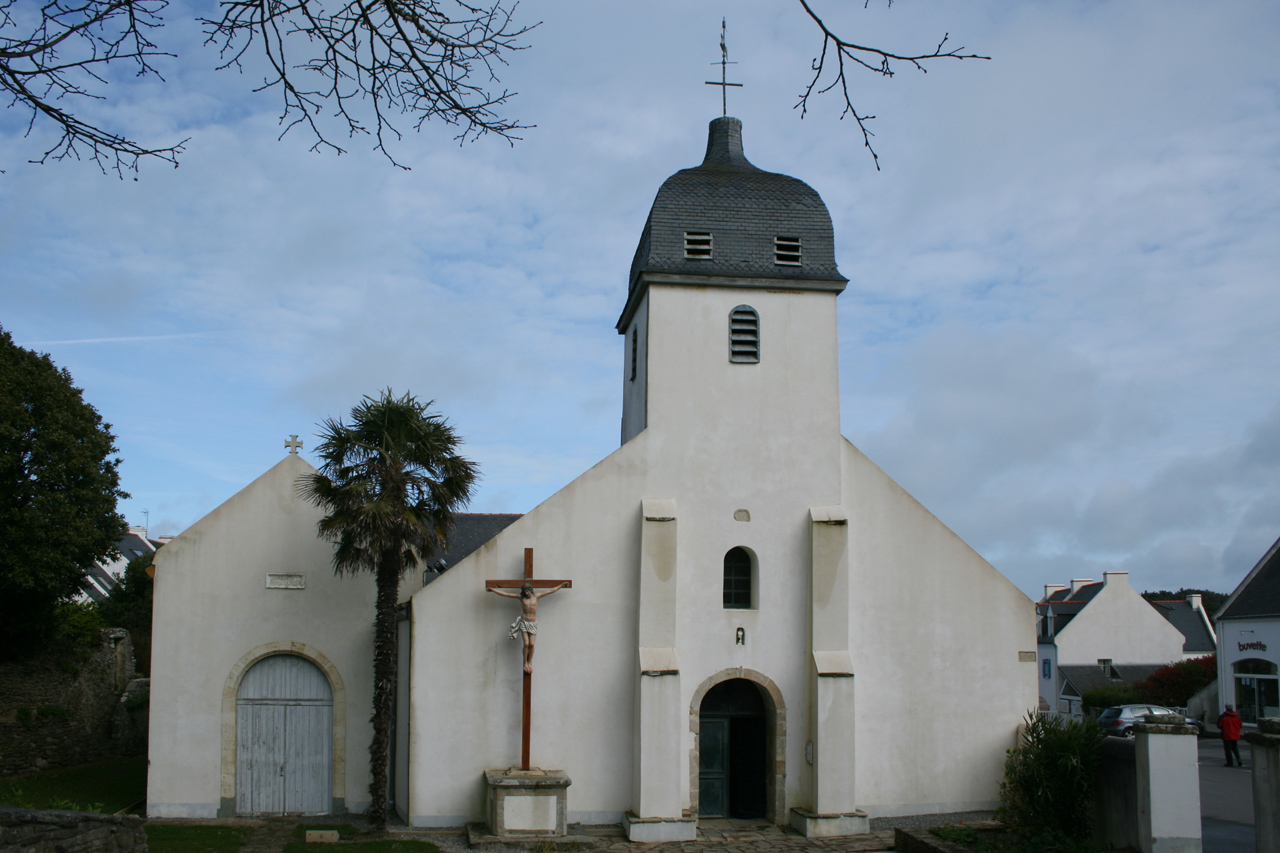
- The church in Locmaria
- Location of Locmaria
- Location within France Location within Brittany
- Coordinates: 47°17′42″N 3°04′57″W
- Country: France
- Region: Brittany
- Department: Morbihan
- Arrondissement: Lorient
- Canton: Quiberon
- Intercommunality: Belle-Île-en-Mer

Government
  - Mayor (2026–32): Dominique Rousselot
- Area^{1}: 20.55 km^{2} (7.93 sq mi)
- Highest elevation: 73 m (240 ft)
- Lowest elevation: 0 m (0 ft)
- Population (2023): 978
  - Density: 47.6/km^{2} (123/sq mi)
- Time zone: UTC+01:00 (CET)
  - Summer (DST): UTC+02:00 (CEST)
- INSEE/Postal code: 56114 /56360
- ^{1} French Land Register data, which excludes lakes, ponds, glaciers > 1 km^{2} (0.386 sq mi or 247 acres) and river estuaries.

Locmaria (French pronunciation: [lɔkmaʁja]; Breton: Lokmaria-ar-Gerveur) is a commune in the Morbihan department in Brittany in north-western France. Locmaria is one of the four communes of Belle Île.

== Toponymy ==
From the Breton loc which means hermitage (cf.: Locminé) and 'maria' which derive from Mary.

== Demographics ==
Inhabitants of Locmaria are called in French Locmariaïstes.

== Geography ==
The village occupies the eastern part of the island Belle-Île-en-Mer. Rocky cliffs, sometimes 50 meters high, surround the territory. On the north coast, stretches the beach Les Grands Sables.

== Map ==
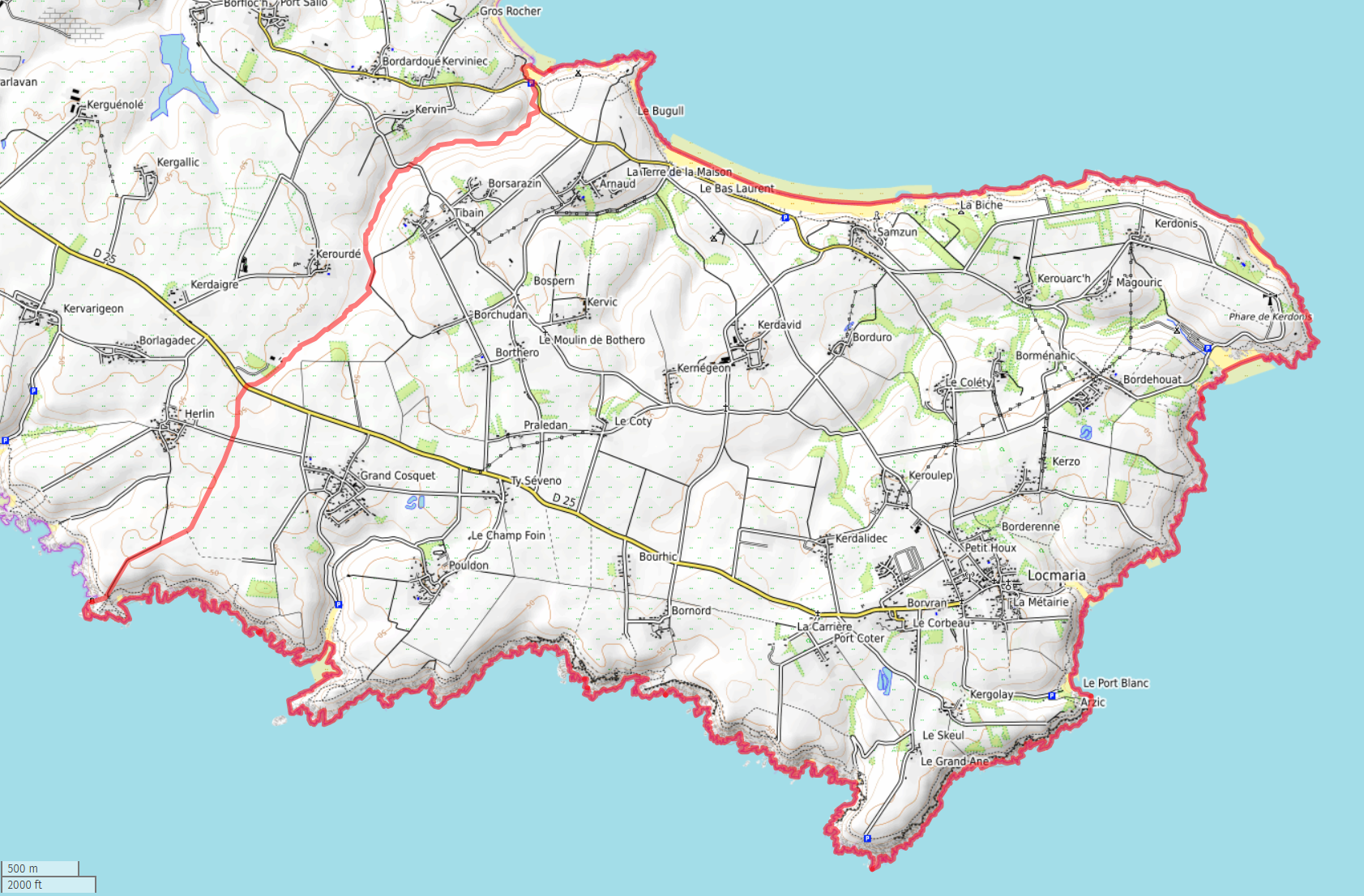
Topographic map

== See also ==
- Communes of the Morbihan department
