= Jean-Yves Hasselin =

French offshore sailor and navigator

Jean-Yves Hasselin, is a French offshore sailor, he competed 1992–1993 Vendée Globe which is the pinnacle solo round the world race he was the last finisher in 7th onboard PRB/Solo Nantes in a time of 153 days 5 hrs and 14 minutes with half the fleet not finishing.
