= Nigel Burgess (yachtsman) =

British yachtsman (1942–1992)

Nigel Allan Burgess (1942–1992) was a British single-handed yachtsman, Master Mariner and businessman. He took part in the OSTAR and the Vendée Globe. He founded Nigel Burgess Yacht Brokers, a company which has remained one of the leading yachtbrokers in the world, and was responsible for the sale of Saddam Hussein's yacht in 2008.

== Biography ==
Born in 1942 in Cheam, Surrey he was educated at Homefield Preparatory School and Thames Nautical Training College. He served with the Royal Fleet Auxiliary (RFA) gaining his master's ticket. His first major single handed yacht race was the Observer Single-Handed Trans-Atlantic Race in 1968 in which he sailed his yacht Dogwatch.

On leaving the RFA he established Nigel Burgess Yacht Brokers and moved his home to Monaco.

He subsequently entered the 1988 Carlsberg Single-Handed Trans-Atlantic Race in Dogwatch A coming first in his class.

In 1992 he entered that year's Vendée Globe and was lost at sea three days into the race. His yacht broking firm, later known simply as Burgess Yachts, continued under the management of part-owner Jonathan Beckett.
