= 1992–1993 Vendée Globe =

Event title
- Name: 1992–1993 Vendée Globe
- Edition: 2nd Edition
- Sponsor: Vendee Region of France

Event details
- Start location: Les Sables-d'Olonne
- Finish location: Les Sables-d'Olonne
- Course: Solo non-stop round the world race
- Start date: 22 November 1992
- Finish date: 22 November 1992
- Yachts: IMOCA 50; IMOCA 60

Results
- (gold) Gold: Alain Gautier (FRA); Bagages Superior

The 1992–1993 Vendée Globe was a non-stop solo round-the-world yacht race for IMOCA 50 and IMOCA 60 class yachts, and started on 22 November 1992 from Les Sables-d'Olonne.

== Summary ==
The second race attracted a great deal of media coverage. American Mike Plant, one of the entrants in the first Vendée race, was lost at sea on the way to the race, his boat found capsized near the Azores.

The race set off into extremely bad weather in the Bay of Biscay, and several racers returned to the start to make repairs before setting off again (the only stopover allowed by the rules). Four days after the start, British sailor Nigel Burgess was found drowned off Cape Finisterre, having presumably fallen overboard. Alain Gautier and Bertrand de Broc led the race down the Atlantic; however, keel problems forced de Broc to abandon in New Zealand. Gautier continued with Philippe Poupon close behind, but a dismasting close to the finish held Poupon back, allowing Jean-Luc Van Den Heede to take second place. Nándor Fa became the first non French national to finish the race.

== Results ==
Table: Order of Finish, 1992–1993 Vendée Globe
Pos	Sailor	Yacht	Time	Ref
1	Alain Gautier (FRA)	Bagages Superior	110d 02h 22' 35"	
2	Jean-Luc Van Den Heede (FRA)	Groupe Sofap-Helvim	116d 15h 01' 11"	
3	Philippe Poupon (FRA)	Fleury-Michon X	117d 03h 34' 24"	
4	Yves Parlier (FRA)	Cacolac d'Aquitaine	125d 02h 42' 24"	
5	Nándor Fa (HUN)	K&H Bank Matav	128d 16h 05' 04"	
6	José Luis Ugarte (ESP)	Euskadi Europ 93 BBK	134d 05h 04' 00"	
7	Jean-Yves Hasselin (FRA)	PRB / Solo Nantes	153d 05h 14' 00"	
Did not finish
DNF	(France) (Switzerland) Bernard Gallay	Vuarnet Watches	rigging problems	
DNF	Vittorio Malingri (ITA)	Everlast / Neil Pryde Sails	lost rudder	
DNF	Bertrand de Broc (FRA)	Groupe LG	keel problems	
DNF	Alan Wynne-Thomas (GBR)	Cardiff Discovery	medical reasons	
DNF	Loïck Peyron (FRA)	Fujicolor III	sail failure	
DNF	Thierry Arnaud (FRA)	Maître Coq / Le Monde	unprepared	
DNF	Nigel Burgess (GBR)	Nigel Burgess Yachts	lost at sea	
Did not start
DNS	Mike Plant (USA)	Coyote	lost at sea prior to departure	
DNS	Richard Tolkien (GBR)	ENIF	Withdraw for family reasons and boat readyness	

== Competitors ==
=== Participants Gallery ===
Alan Wynne-Thomas

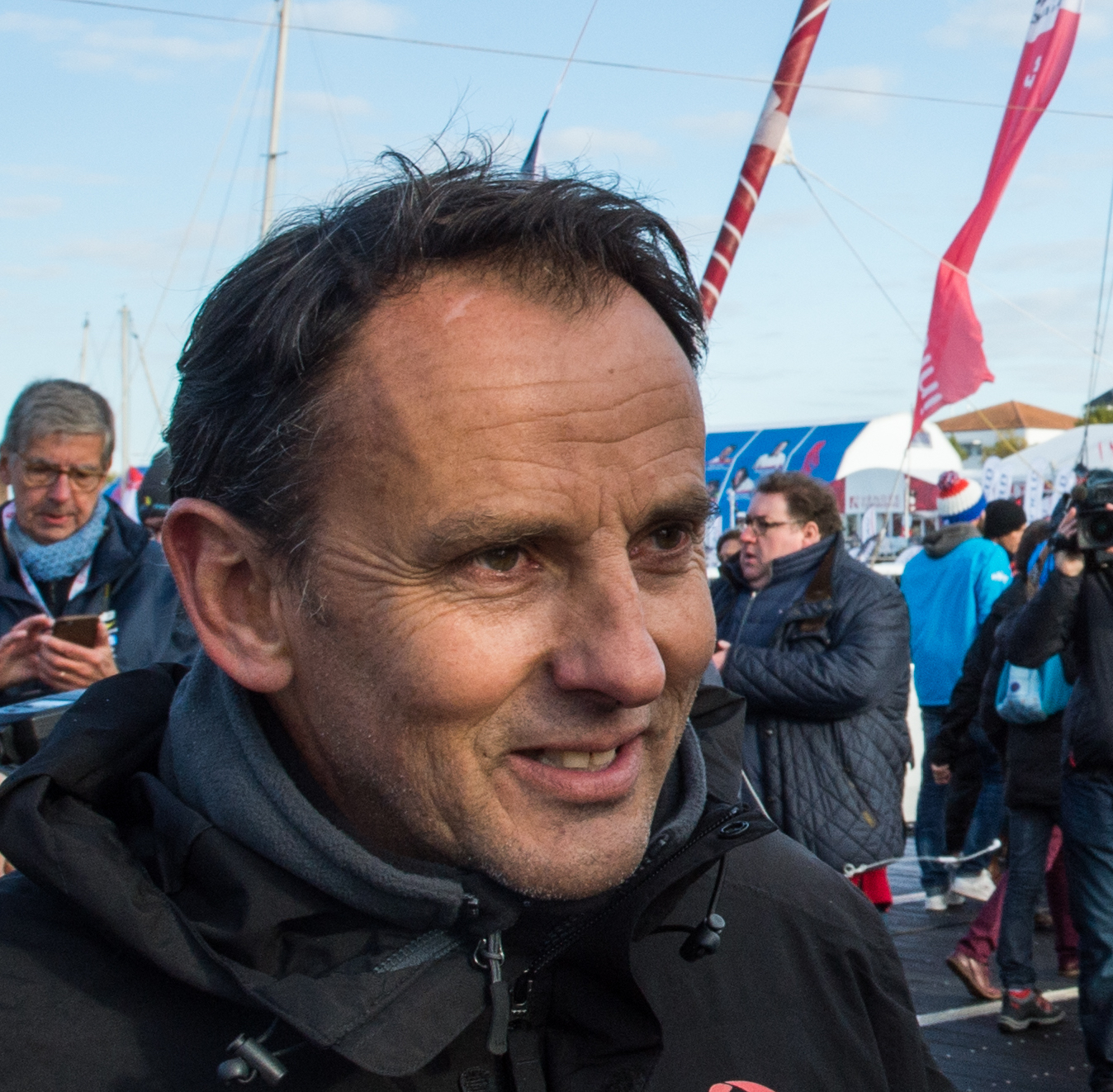
1. Alain Gautier

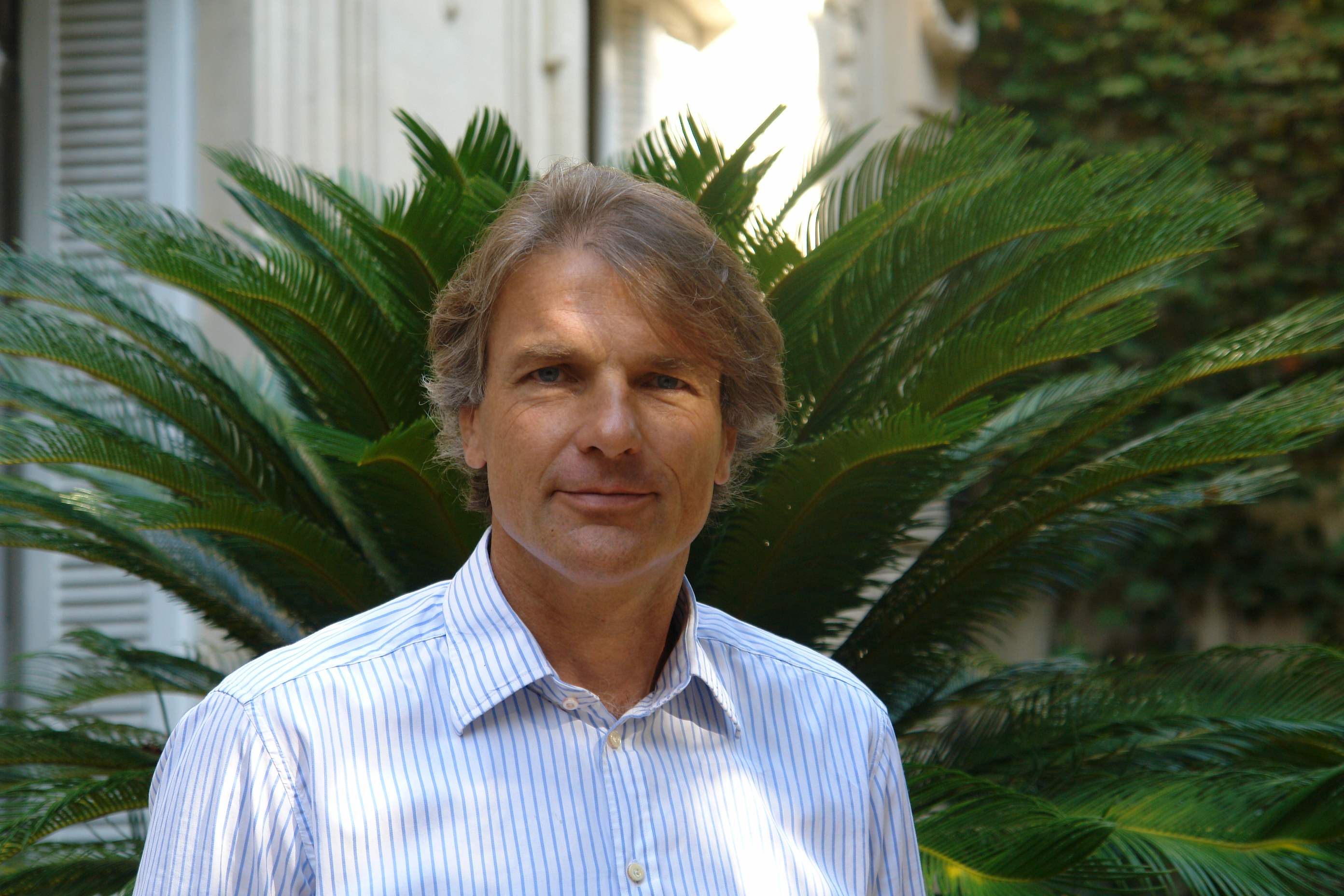
Bernard Gallay

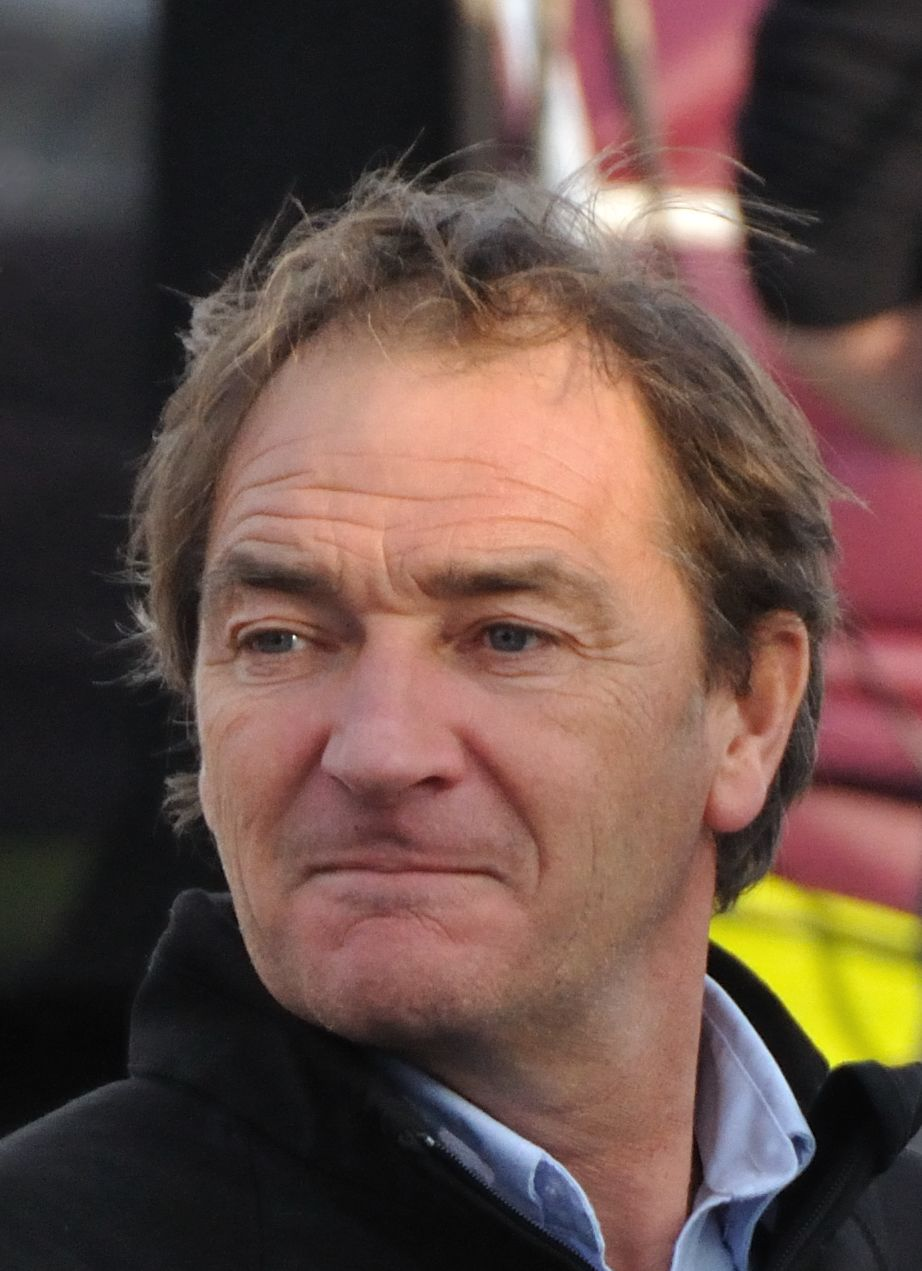
Bertrand de Broc

Jean-Yves Hasselin

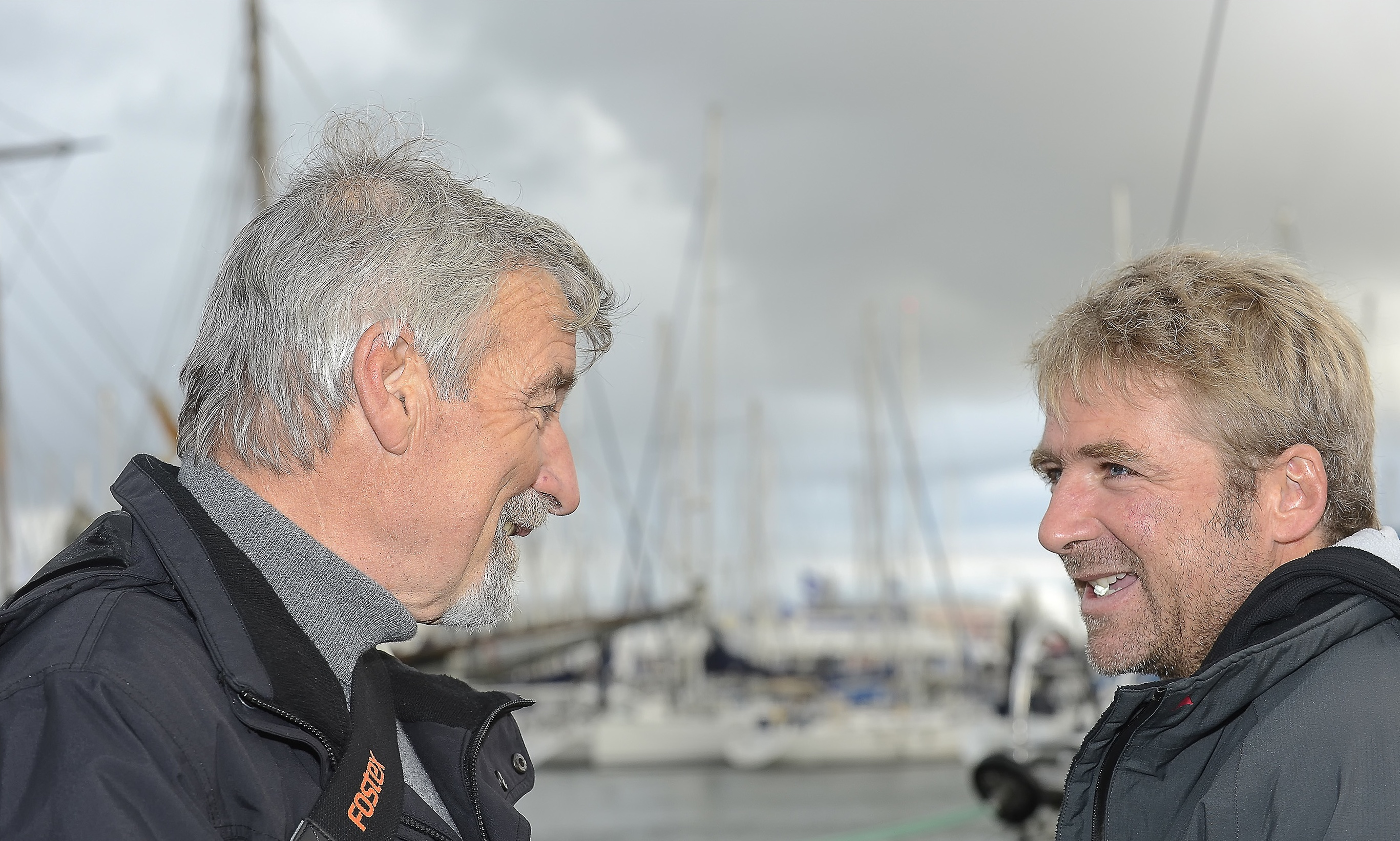
Jean-Luc Van Den Heede

José Luis Ugarte

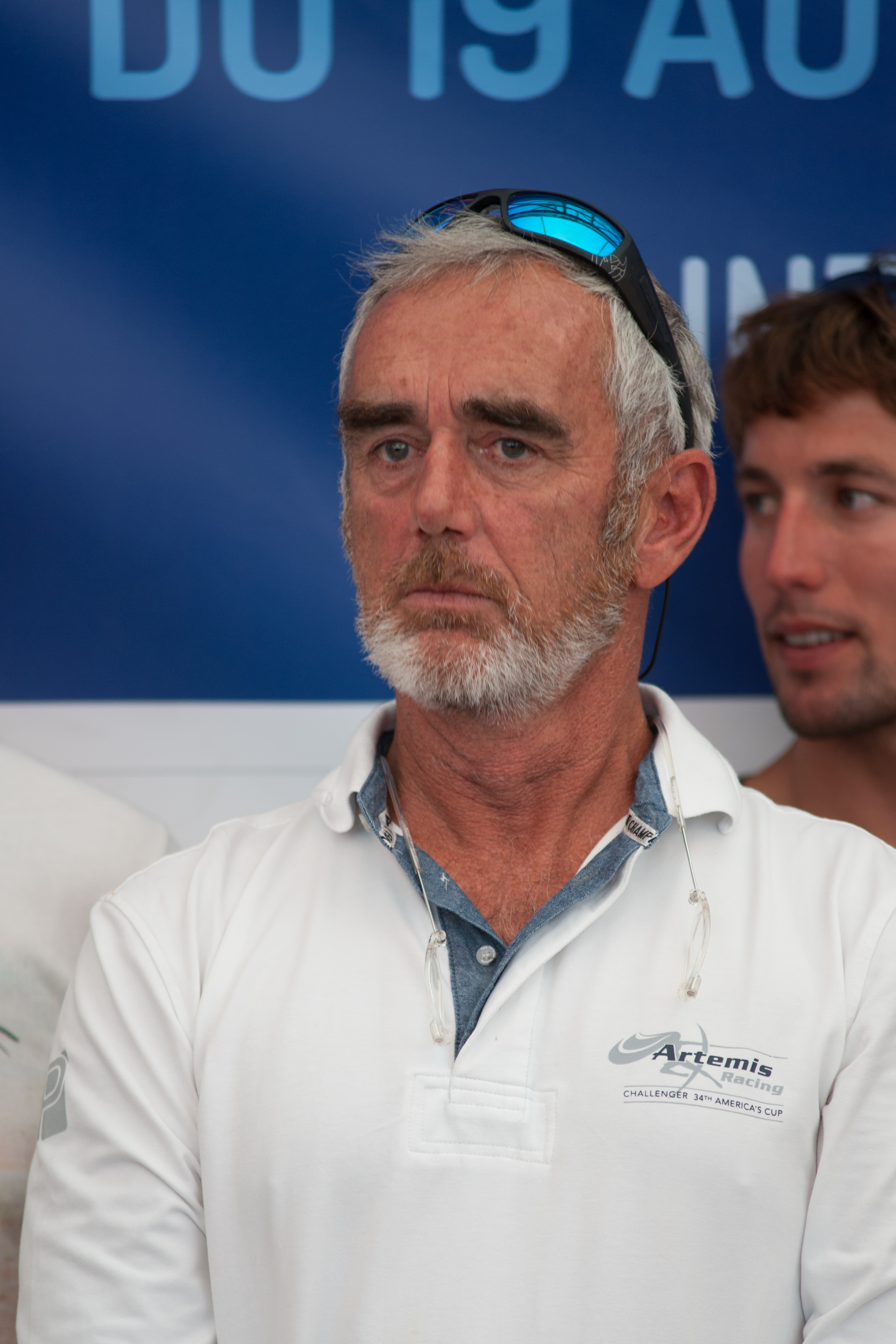
Loïck Peyron

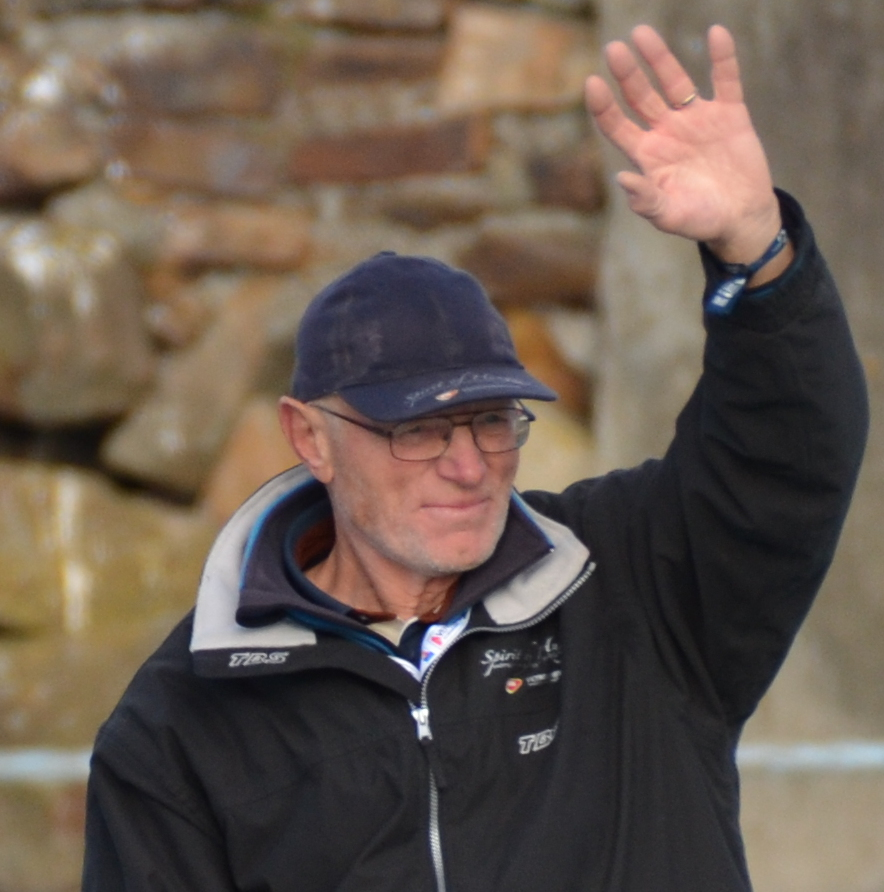
Nándor Fa

Nigel Burgess

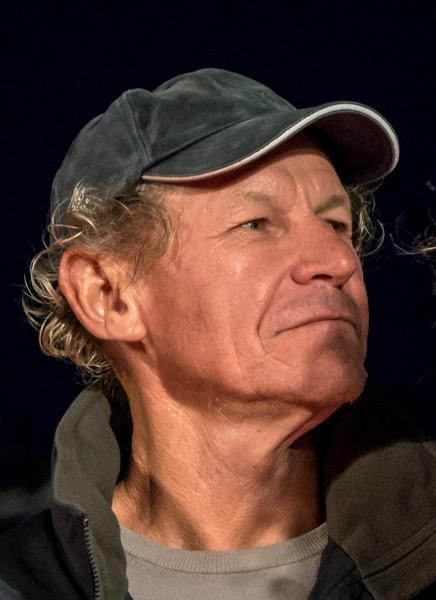
Philippe Poupon

Thierry Arnaud

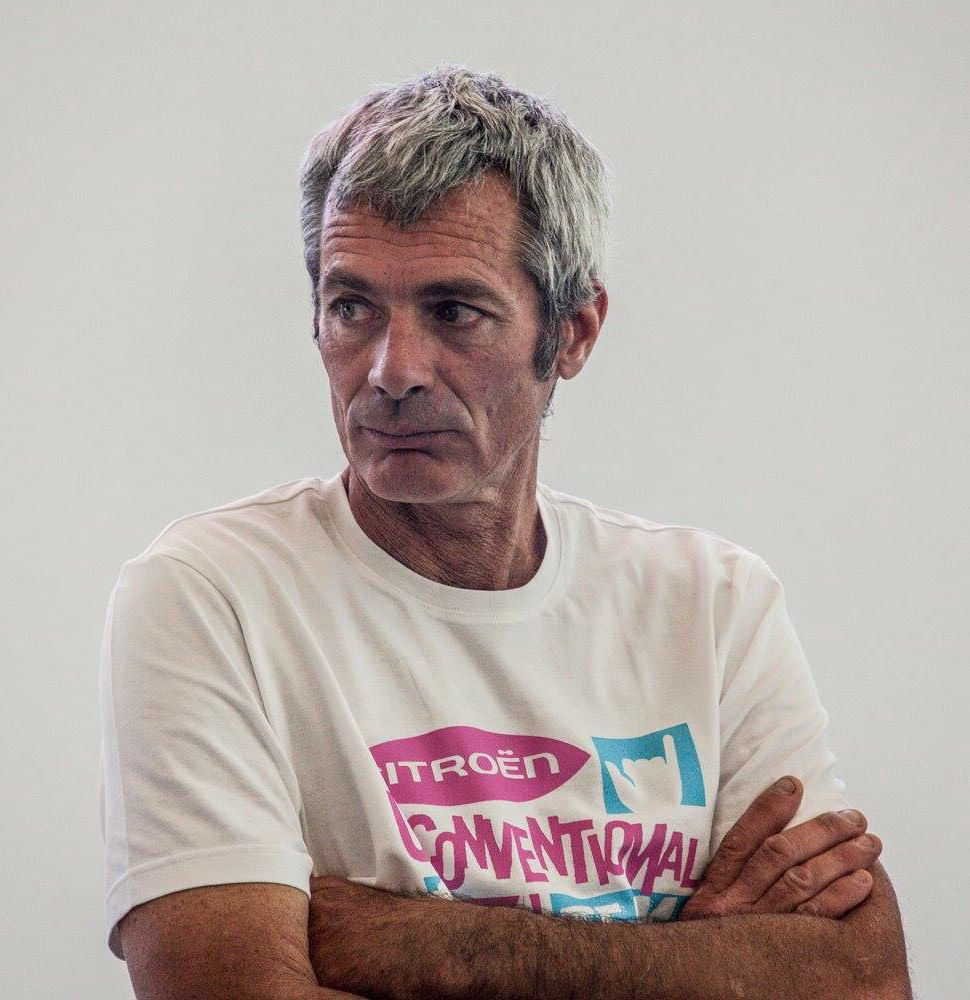
Vittorio Malingri

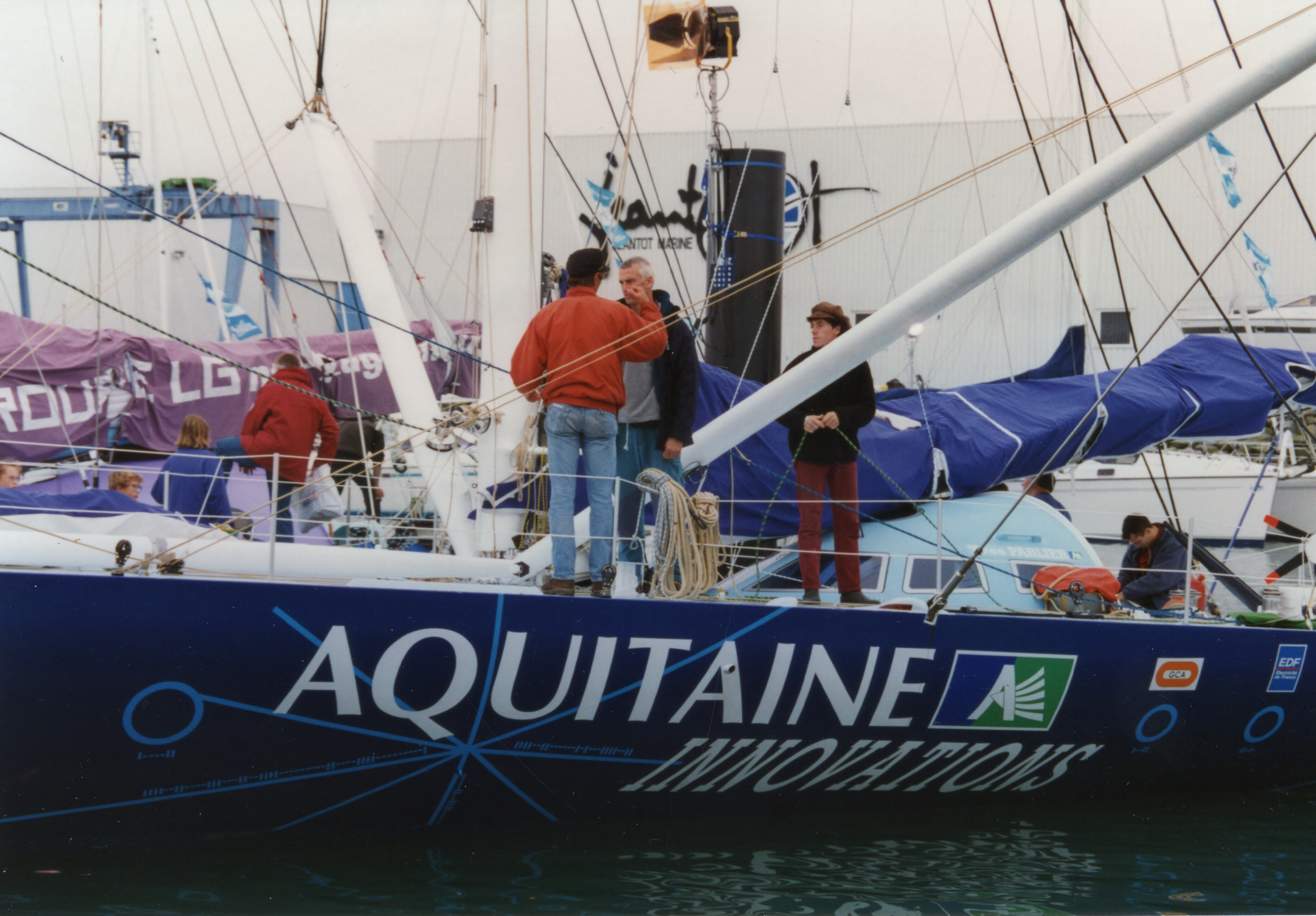
Yves Parlier

=== Participant Facts Equipment ===
Fifteen skippers started the race.

List of participants and equipment used
Skipper	Prev. Edition Results	Name of boat	Naval architect	Builder	Launch date	Noted	Ref.
Alain Gautier (FRA)	6th	Bagages Superior	Finot-Conq	CDK Technologies	1992	Aluminum Construction	
Alan Wynne-Thomas (GBR)	Never	Cardiff Discovery	Lindenberg-Bergstrom		1983		
Bertrand de Broc (FRA)	Never	Groupe LG	Luc Bouvet; Olivier Petit	Chantier Capitaine Flint	1989		
Bernard Gallay (FRA) (SUI)	Never	Vuarnet Watches	Philippe Harlé; Alain Mortain	Garcia	1989		
Jean-Yves Hasselin (FRA)	Never	PRB/Solo Nantes	Lucas		1991		
Jean-Luc Van Den Heede (FRA)	Never	Groupe Sofap-Helvim	Philippe Harlé; Alain Mortain	CDK Technologies	1991		
José Luis Ugarte (ESP)	Never	Euskadi Europ 93 BBK	Finot-Conq	Le Guen-Hémidy	1989		
Loïck Peyron (FRA)	2nd	Fujicolor III	Bouvet-Petit		1992		
Mike Plant (USA)	DNF	Duracell	Rodger Martin	chantier Concordia	1992		
Nigel Burgess (GBR)	Never	Nigel Burgess Yachts	Joubert	chantier Hervé et Pinta	1989		
Nándor Fa (HUN)	Never	K&H Bank Matav	Nandor Fa et Lexen	Chantier Nandor Fa	1989		
Philippe Poupon (FRA)	DNF	Fleury-Michon X	Philippe Briand	ATA Jeanneau	1989		
Thierry Arnaud (FRA)	Never	Maître Coq/Le Monde informatique	Philippe Harlé; Alain Mortain	Garcia	1992		
Vittorio Mallingri (ITA)	Never	Everlast Neil Pryde Sails	Malingri	Coop Nautica Fano	1992		
Yves Parlier (FRA)	Never	Cacolac d'Aquitaine	Finot-Conq	Marc Pinta	1990		
