= Voiles de Saint-Tropez =

The Voiles de Saint-Tropez is a regatta that takes place once a year in the gulf of Saint-Tropez, Var, France.

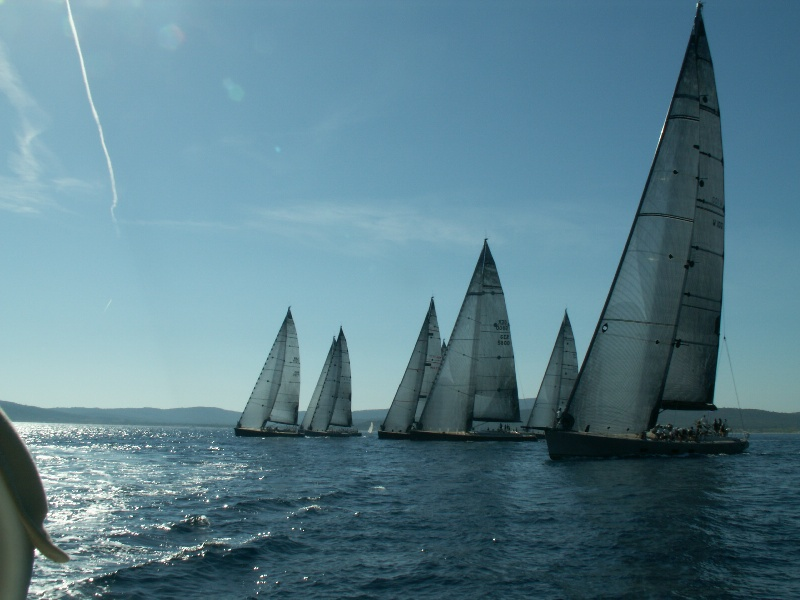
Sailboats during the 2007 regatta
