= Quiberon Bay =

Bay of Brittany, France

- Baie de Quiberon (French)
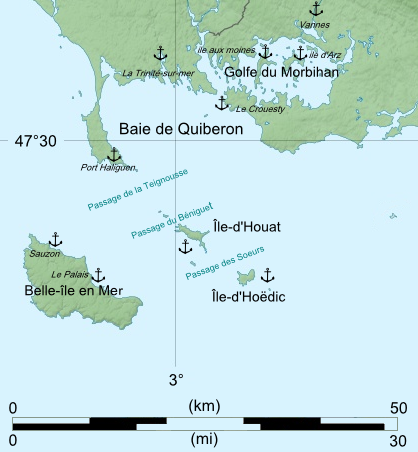
- Map of Quiberon Bay

- Location off the coast of France
- Coordinates: 47°31′N 3°0′W
- Type: Bay

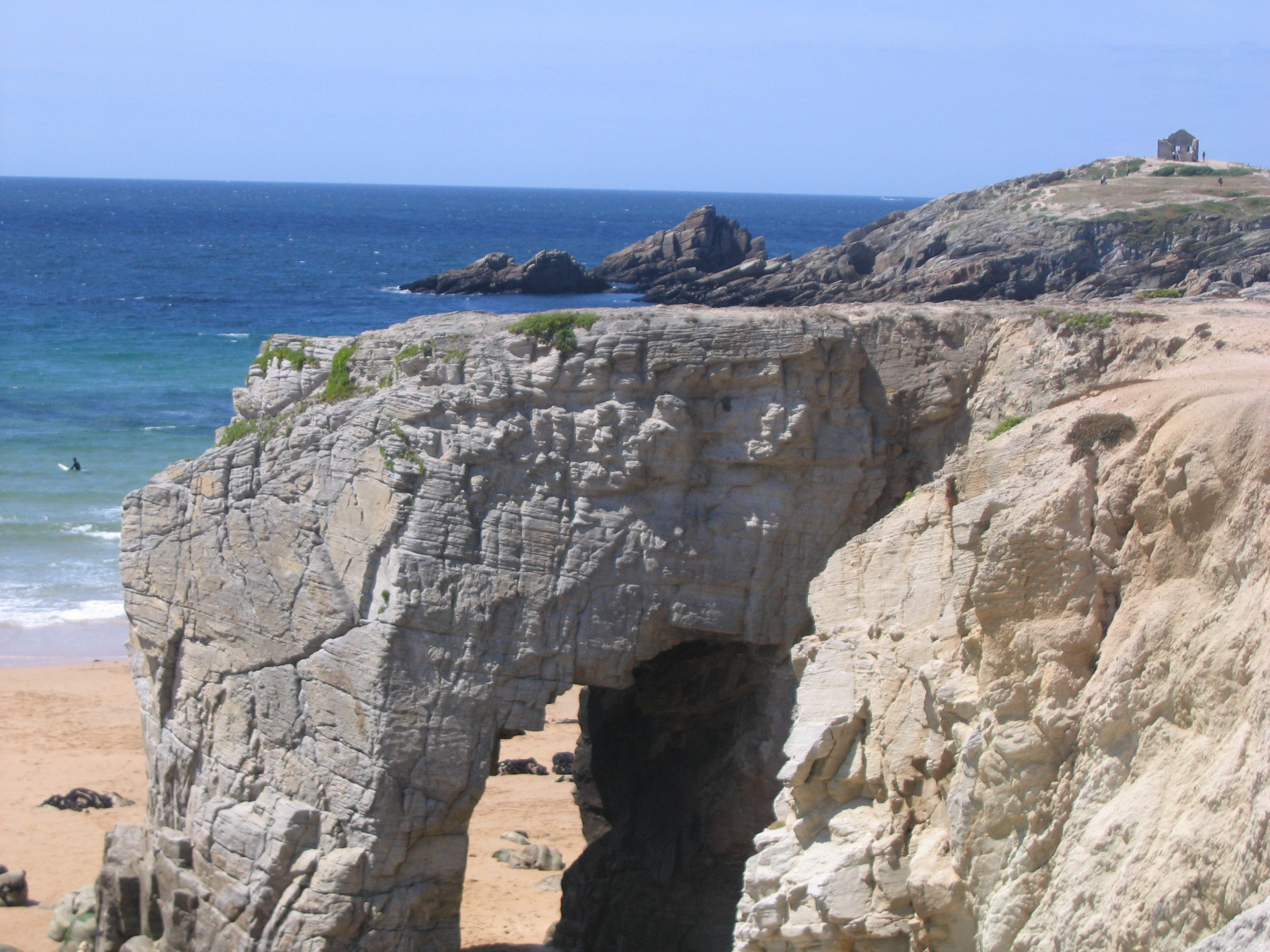
Port Blanc Arch and Quiberon Bay

Quiberon Bay (French: Baie de Quiberon, [bɛ də kibʁɔ̃]; Breton: Bae Kiberen) is an area of sheltered water on the south coast of Brittany. The bay is in the Morbihan département.

== Geography ==
The bay is roughly triangular in shape, open to the south with the Gulf of Morbihan to the north-east and the narrow peninsula of Presqu'île de Quiberon providing protection from the Atlantic Ocean to the west. The islands of Belle-Île, Houat and Hœdic add to the bay's protection. There are many dangerous shoals at the entrance to the bay.

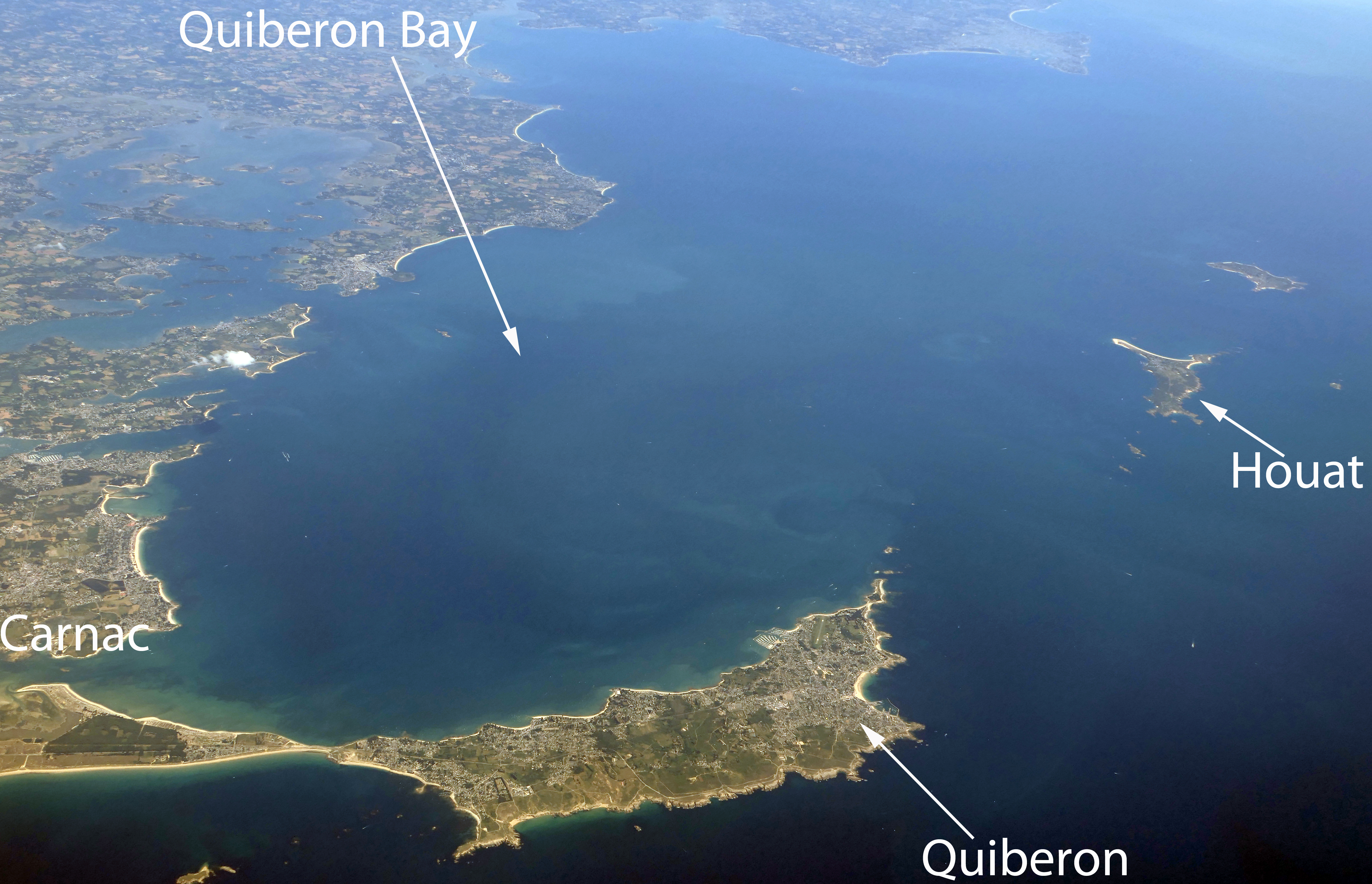
Aerial view of the bay

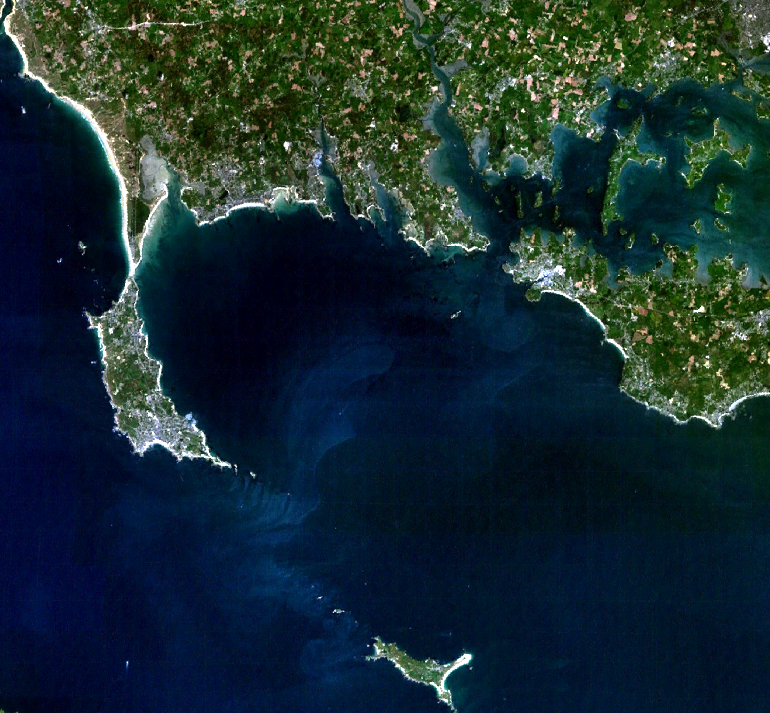
Satellite image of the bay

== History ==
Quiberon Bay has been the location of several important naval battles.

=== Battle of Morbihan ===
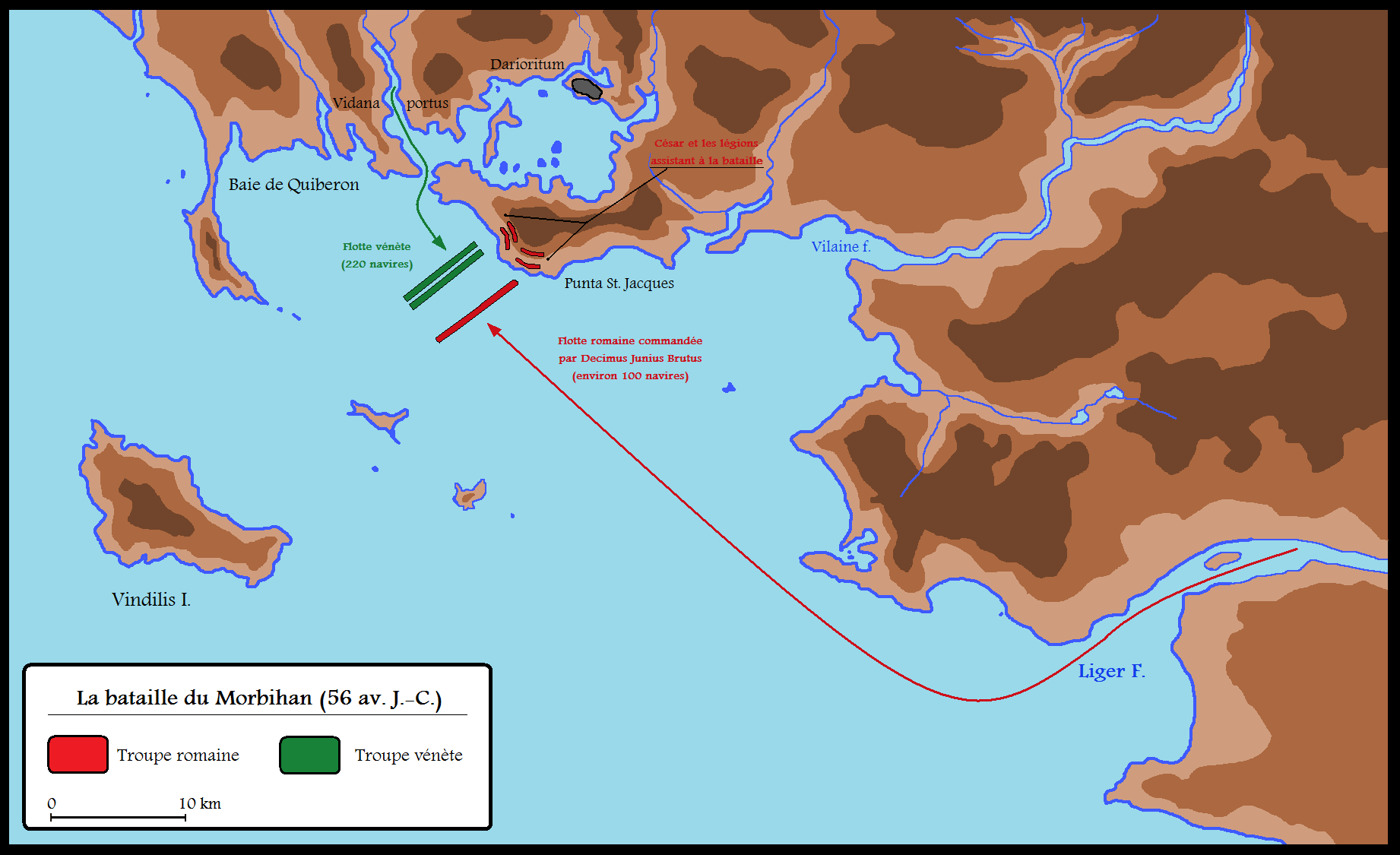
Battle of Morbihan

The first recorded battle in Quiberon Bay's history was the Battle of Morbihan in 56 BCE, between the Romans, led by Decimus Junius Brutus Albinus, and the local Veneti tribe during the Gallic Wars.

The Romans had struggled to overcome the Veneti, who had coastal fortresses that could easily be evacuated by their powerful navy. Eventually, the Romans built galleys and met the Veneti sailing fleet in Quiberon Bay. Despite being outnumbered 220 to 100 by a fleet of heavier ships, the Romans used hooks on long poles to shred the halyards holding up the leather sails of the Veneti, leaving the Veneti fleet dead in the water and easily overcome.

=== Battle of Quiberon Bay ===
The Battle of Quiberon Bay, on 20 November 1759, was one of Britain's greatest naval victories over the French.

The British Admiral Sir Edward Hawke with twenty-three ships of the line caught up with a French fleet with twenty-one ships of the line under Marshal de Conflans seeking to embark an army at Quiberon for landings in Scotland. After hard fighting, most of the French fleet were sunk, captured or forced aground. The battle was a turning point in the Seven Years' War which foiled a planned invasion of Britain and broke the power of the French Navy for a generation.

=== Vendée Revolt ===
On 23 June 1795, the bay was the scene of an invasion by émigré, counter-revolutionary troops in support of the Chouannerie and Vendée Revolt.

The invasion aimed to raise the whole of western France in revolt, bring an end to the French Revolution and restore the French monarchy. The landing was finally repulsed on 21 July, dealing a disastrous blow to the royalist cause.

=== Operation Chastity ===
Operation Chastity was a World War II plan by the Allies to seize Quiberon Bay, enabling the construction of an artificial harbor to support Operation Overlord and the Liberation of France.

The artificial harbor was not developed, as the capture of German-held areas that could threaten the port was not completed. By the end of August 1944, US forces had captured all of Brittany except for the critical areas, preventing the further development of the operation. Following the capture of Antwerp and its port facilities in early September 1944, Operation Chastity was officially cancelled on 7 September 1944.

=== 1998 air crash ===
On 30 July 1998, Proteus Airlines Flight 706, a Beechcraft 1900 bound for Lorient, France, collided with a Cessna 177 while making a detour to overfly the SS Norway as it was sailing in the bay. Both aircraft fell into the bay after the collision, and the fifteen people on board the aircraft were killed.

== Economy ==
In the 19th century, Nicolas Appert, a chemist, developed a technique that permitted the sterilization of food. Thanks to this process, Quiberon became the leading harbour for sardine fishing and the production of canned sardines in France.

The area has since become a tourist destination popular for yachting, with marinas at Port Haliguen, Le Crouesty and La Trinité-sur-Mer.

== See also ==
- Quiberon—Comune on the tip of the peninsula
- Saint-Pierre-Quiberon—Comune at the north of the peninsula
