= Élie Le Goff =

French sculptor (1858–1938)

Élie Le Goff père
- Born: 1858
- Died: 1938 (aged 79–80)
- Occupation: Sculptor

Élie Le Goff was a French sculptor born in 1858 and who died in 1938. He was a pupil of Henri Chapu and Paul Guibe and was the father of Paul, Élie junior and Henri who were all artists and sculptors. All three sons lost their lives in the 1914–1918 war. Élie junior and Paul both joined the 71st Infantry Regiment in August 1914 then moved to the 74th Infantry Regiment, both dying from gas inhalation at Boezinge in Belgium on 22 April 1915. Henri was killed in 1918 in fighting around the Meuse.

This article gives details of most of Élie Le Goff senior's work and also two works by Paul Le Goff. Paul Le Goff was born in Saint-Brieuc on 1 April 1883 and died in 1915, Élie junior was born in 1881 and Henri was born in 1887.

Amongst Élie senior's works are the composition "L'enfant rieur", a bust of Villiers l'Isles Adam and several war memorials ("monuments aux morts"). His son Élie was a student at the École des Arts décoratifs in Paris. His works include "Un accident de carrière" and "Les Frileuses". His son Paul produced many works including "La Synthèse de l'hiver" which won the "Roux" prize in 1912 and "La forme se dégageant de la matière" which was awarded the "Prix Chenavard". His son Henri had studied in New York. In Saint-Brieuc one of the main streets carries the name "Trois Frères Le Goff".

== Main works ==
The following are works attributed to him.

=== La Chapelle Notre-Dame de la Fontaine ===
Élie Le Goff was responsible for the limestone sculptures of Saint Brieuc and Saint Tugdual in this Saint Brieuc church situated in the rue Ruffelet. The original chapel was demolished in 1799 and reconstructed in 1838 by Julie Bagot. Le Goff's two sculptures date to 1896.

=== Decoration of the Saint-Laurent parish church in Callac ===
The capitals of the columns lining the nave of the Église paroissiale Saint-Laurent in Callac were by Élie Le Goff.

=== Bust of Charles Baratoux ===
This Élie Le Goff sculpture can be seen in Saint-Brieuc's Place Baratoux and depicts the ex-mayor Baratoux. Le Goff's sculpture replaced a Jean Boucher sculpture which had been confiscated in 1942 by the Vichy authorities and the bronze melted down for re-use.

=== Statue of Joan of Arc ===
This statue, carved from wood, stands in Guingamp's Rue Notre-Dame by the Basilique Notre-Dame de Bon Secours and is a work by Élie Le Goff based on Princess Marie d'Orléans' model of Joan called "Prière avant le combat" ('The Prayer before the Battle'). Joan is depicted in a suit of armour and carrying a sword. She is flanked by statues of Saint Catherine and Saint Marguerite. The statue stands on a column with relief panels carved from wood by Le Goff at its base. These reliefs depict:

1. "Jeanne d'arc ecoutant ses voix" - Jeanne d'Arc listening to her voices

2. "Le sacre de Charles vii" - Coronation of Charles VII in Reims

3. "Entrée triumphale à Orléans" -The triumphal entry into Orléans

4. "Supplice de jeanne d'arc" - The execution of Jeanne d'Arc

5. Apotheose

Princesse Marie d'Orléans was an accomplished sculptor and in 1838 executed a statue of Jeanne d'Arc and it is this that Le Goff used as a model for his sculpture.

=== Auguste de Villiers de L'Isle-Adam ===
Also in Saint-Brieuc's Parc des Promenades is a marble bust by Élie Le Goff of Auguste de Villiers de L'Isle-Adam, the French symbolist writer. The work was completed in 1914.

=== The tomb of the three Le Goff brothers ===
Élie's sons Paul Le Goff and his two brothers were all killed in the 1914–1918 war and are buried in the Saint-Michel cemetery in Saint-Brieuc and Élie was commissioned to carry out the tomb's decoration. He executed a bronze medallion and in a tribute to Paul, made a granite version of a work in plaster entitled "Funérailles bretonnes" executed by Paul before the start of the war. This moving composition depicts the porch of a chapel from which three generations of Breton women are emerging. They wear mourning clothes. The Saint-Michel cemetery is located in Saint-Brieuc's Rue Jobert de Lamballe. Élie Le Goff junior was killed in Boezinge in Belgium in 1915, as was Paul Le Goff, whilst Henri Le Goff was killed in 1918 at Les Monthairons in the Meuse. The bronze medallion depicts the three brothers, from left to right, Élie, Paul, and Henri. Below the medallion is the granite relief. The inscription reads

"Á La Mémoire Des Trois Frères LE GOFF morts pour la France 1914 — 1918 Signed: E. Le Goff"

== War Memorials ==
=== Belz, Morbihan War Memorial ===
The sculpture involved here, called "Poilu aux lauriers" and depicting a standing serviceman, is one of a series produced by Elié Le Goff and seen in many communes in Brittany, the only variation being that in some cases the serviceman wears a helmet and in others the beret worn by the marines. Some of the other memorials are at Brech and Etel in Morbihan, Plouha, and Merdrignac and Plémet in Côtes-d'Armor. This memorial dates to 1925. In most cases the work has been cast in bronze although that in Plélan-le-Grand was executed using the local stone kersantite much favoured by sculptors. Another work produced as a series was that entitled "Le coq".

=== Plérin War Memorial ===
This communes' 1919 war memorial has one of the bronze Elie Le Goff cockerels mentioned above.

=== Quessoy War Memorial ===
The Quessoy memorial lists the names of 155 soldiers killed in the 1914–1918 war of which 8 were killed early in the war in the 1914 "Race to the sea" and 2 in the Balkans fighting with the "Armée française d'Orient". Another 10 names added subsequently are of those killed in the 1939–1945 war and one victim of the Indochinese conflict is also added.

=== Saint-Jacut-de-la-Mer War Memorial ===
This war memorial was erected in 1928 and Élie Le Goff's "coq gaulois" is placed at the top of the obelisk, its right claw resting on a soldier's helmet.

=== Quintin War Memorial ===
The memorial stands in the Rue aux Toiles and remembers the men of Quintin who were killed in the 1914–1918 war. Élie Le Goff carried out the sculptural work involved. The memorial takes the form of a menhir with a relief carving of the head of a helmeted soldier cut into the granite. In front of the menhir, Le Goff places the sculpture of a mother with her child, the woman appearing to be telling the boy who the soldier was. On the back of the menhir is the Quintin coat of arms.

=== Lamballe War Memorial ===
The sculptural work on this memorial is attributed to Le Goff and features an officer with a sword in his hand protecting a dying young soldier. The names of the 168 men killed in the 1914–1918 war are listed as well as those of 11 men who gave their lives in the 1870 war. Subsequently, a further 32 names were added, victims of the 1939–1945 war, and 6 names of men killed in Indochina and Algeria.

=== Lanvollon War Memorial ===
This 1922 granite memorial in the Place du Général de Gaulle has Élie Le Goff's depiction of Joan of Arc with a bas-relief below depicting the head of a soldier in profile.

=== Belle-Motte Military Cemetery in Aiseau-Presles ===
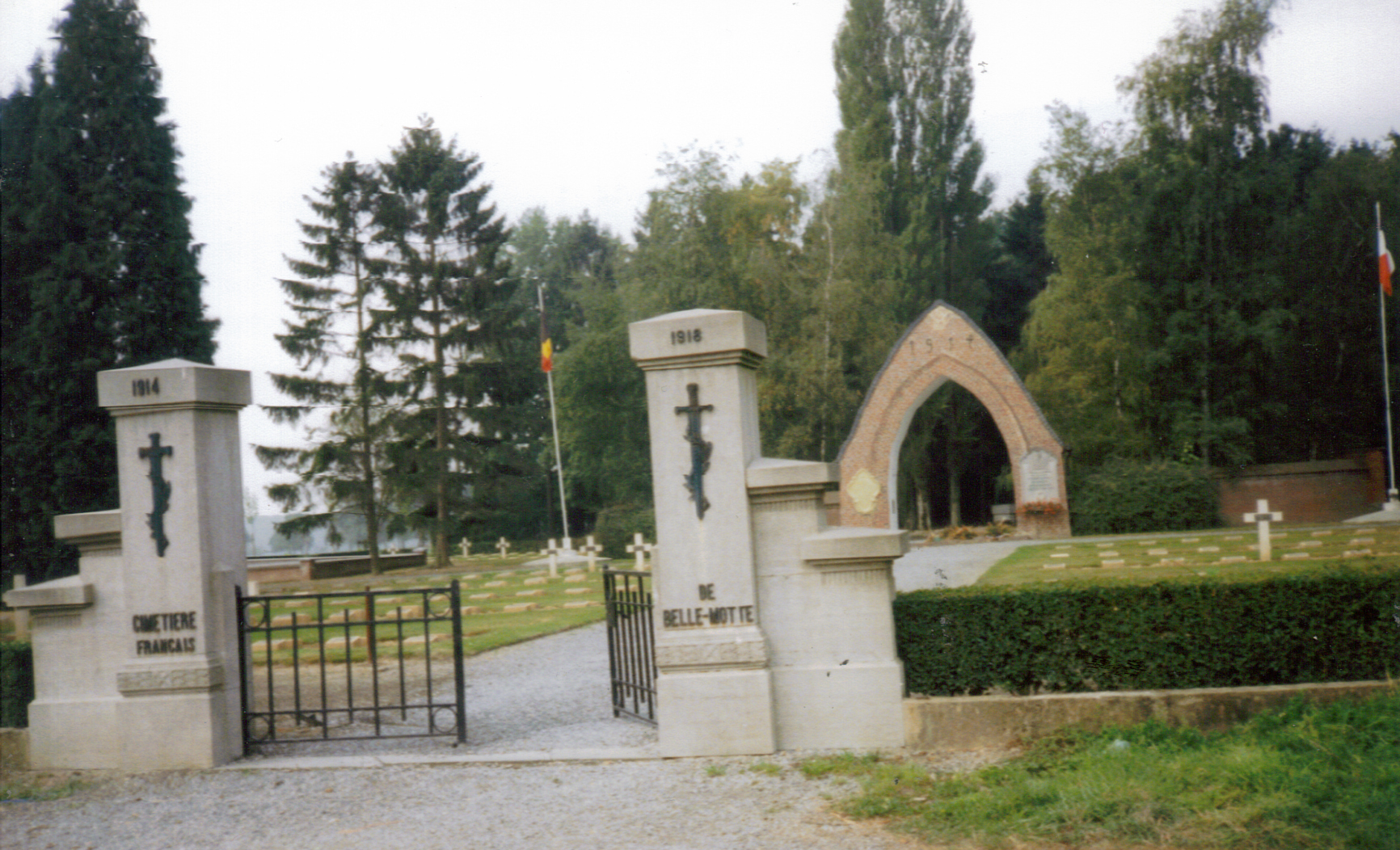
The gothic arch at Belle-Motte

This military cemetery contains the graves of 4,057 French soldiers, the largest concentration of French graves on Belgian soil. In the centre of the cemetery is an arch in the gothic style and inside the arch is a bronze relief by Élie Le Goff depicting the profile of Ernest Cotelle whose sons Georges and Henri gave their lives in the 1914–1918 war and are buried here at Belle-Motte. From 1919 to 1934, Professor Cotelle had given lectures at Belle-Motte.

=== Etel war memorial ===
Placed in the Etel cemetery, this memorial was erected in 1922. It has a cast iron sculpture with a coat of bronze by Elie Le Goff depicting a soldier.

== Funerary sculpture ==
=== "Wernert" tomb ===
In Saint-Brieuc's Cimetière Saint-Michel in the Rue Jobert de Lamballe, Élie Le Goff executed a bronze portrait medallion for the Wernert-Le Restif family.

=== The tomb of Pierre Giffard ===
Also in the Cimetière Saint-Michel is the tomb of the Pierre Giffard which dates to 1915 and has a bronze portrait medallion by Élie Le Goff.

=== The tomb of Alexandre Nouet ===
This bronze portrait medallion dates to 1911.

== Works by Paul Le Goff ==
=== "La forme se dégageant de la matière" ===
This work can be seen in Saint-Brieuc's Parc des Promenades and was sculpted by Paul Le Goff in 1914. The title translates as "The shape emerging from matter" and this was the set subject for the Beaux-Arts de Paris competition for the Prix de Rome. Le Goff came fourth but in 1912 he won the "Grand Prix Roux" with the work "La Synthèse de l'hiver". He also submitted the work "La forme se dégageant de la matière" to the Paris salon and it was awarded the third place medal. It was purchased by the French State to be placed in the Jardin du Luxembourg but then given to Saint-Brieuc.

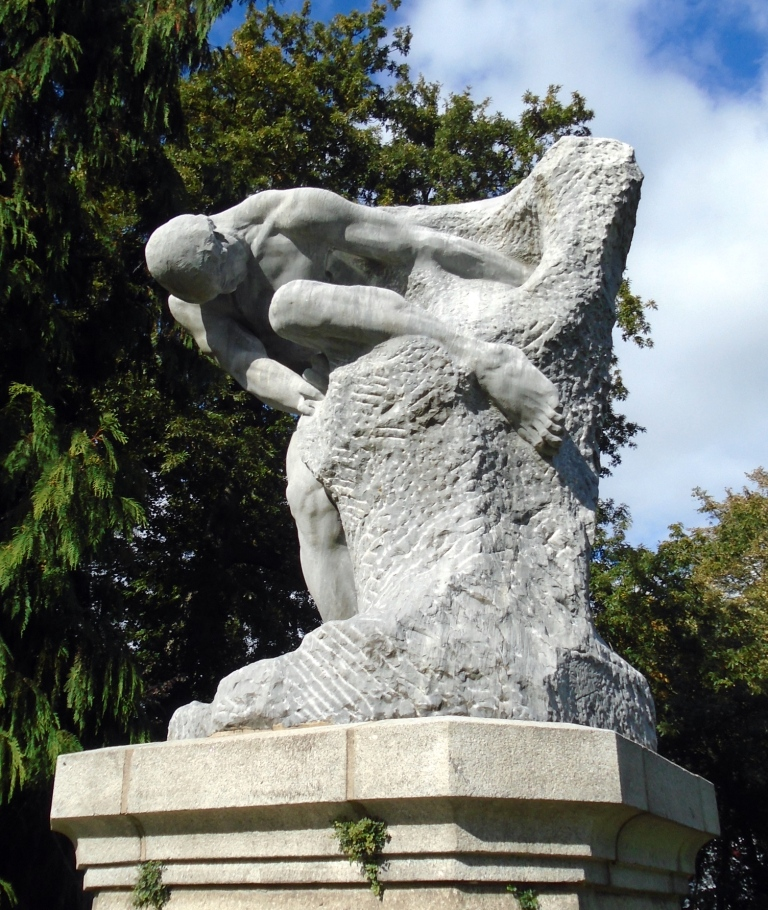
Paul Le Goff's composition "La forme se dégageant de la matière"

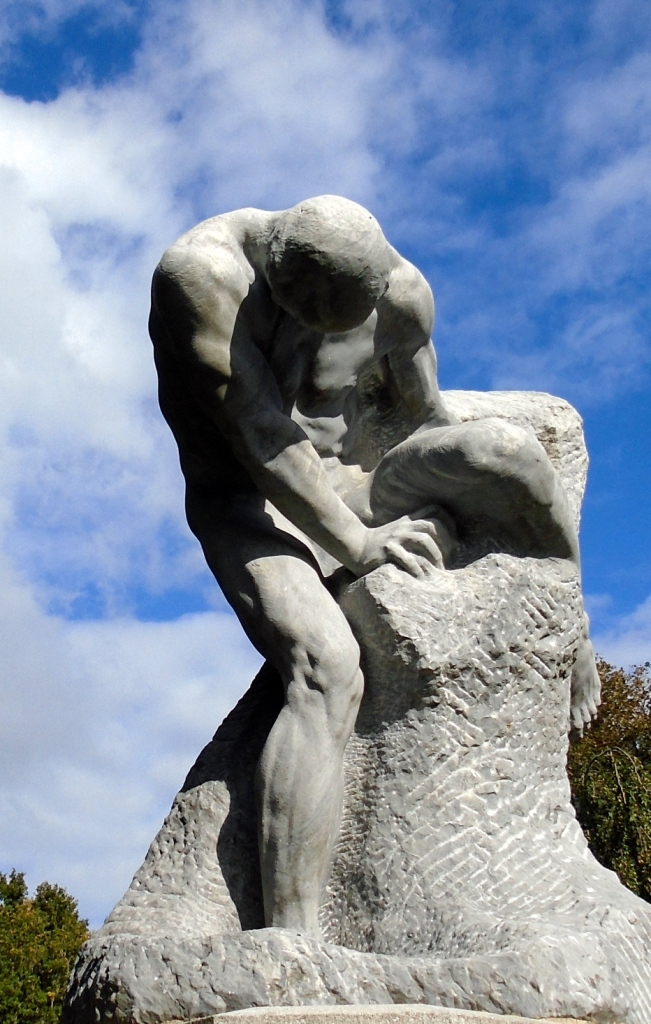
Paul Le Goff's composition "La forme se dégageant de la matière"

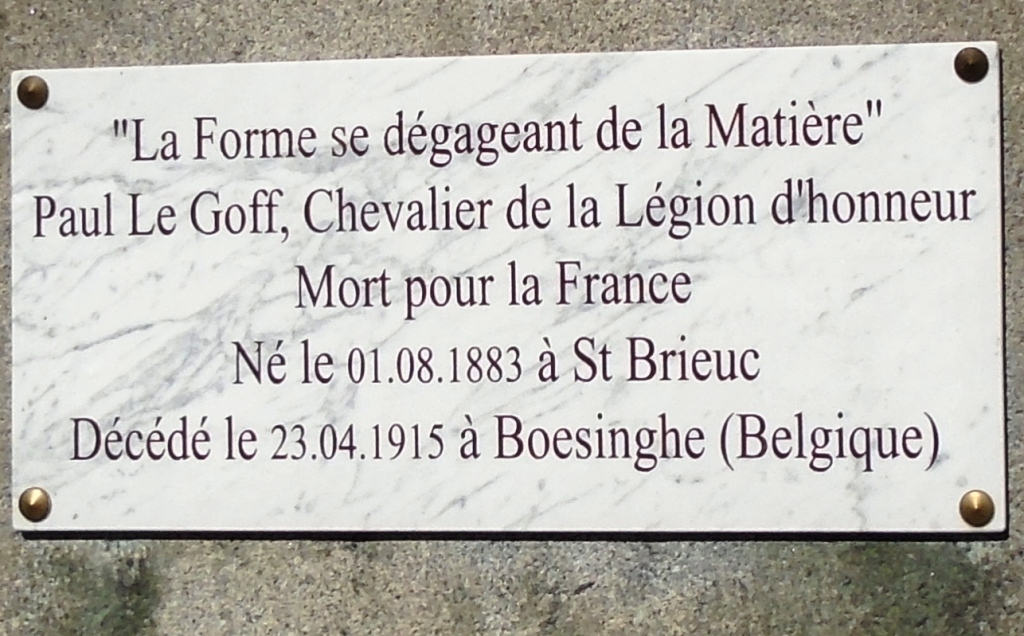
Plaque on Paul Le Goff's composition "La forme se dégageant de la matière"

=== Monument to Paul Le Goff ===
In Saint-Brieuc's Parc des Promenades there is a monument dedicated to Le Goff by Jules-Charles Le Bozec. The inauguration took place on 29 May 1938.
