= Canton of Quiberon =

Coordinates: 47.48°N 3.12°W

Quiberon
- Canton
- Location of the canton of Quiberon within Morbihan
- Country: France
- Region: Brittany
- Department: Morbihan
- No. of communes: 16
- Established: 15 February 1790

Government
  - Representatives (2021–2028): Karine Bellec (DVD); Gérard Pierre (LR)
- Area: 277.40 km^{2} (107.10 sq mi)
- Population (2023): 38,154
  - Density: 137.54/km^{2} (356.23/sq mi)
- INSEE code: 56 17

The Canton of Quiberon (French: canton de Quiberon; Breton: Kanton Kiberen) is an administrative division of the Morbihan department, northwestern France. Its borders were modified at the 2014 French canton reorganisation which came into effect in March 2015. Its seat is in Quiberon.

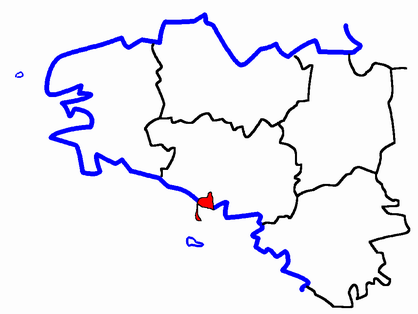
Location of the canton of Quiberon in Morbihan prior to 2015

== Composition ==
=== Composition before 2015 ===
Prior to 2015 the Canton of Quiberon grouped together 7 distinct communes.

List of communes of the Canton of Quiberon prior to the 2014 cantonal redistribution
Name	INSEE code	Postal Code	Total area (km^{2})	Population (2012)	Density (per km^{2})
Quiberon (Canton seat)	56186	56170	8.83	5,008	567
Carnac	56034	56340	32.71	4,204	129
Hœdic	56085	56170	2.08	121	58
Île-d'Houat	56086	56170	2.91	249	86
Plouharnel	56168	56340	18.32	2,126	116
Saint-Pierre-Quiberon	56234	56510	7.54	2,116	281
La Trinité-sur-Mer	56258	56470	6.20	1,635	264

=== Composition since 2015 ===
The Canton of Quiberon currently consists of 16 communes in their entirety.

List of communes of the canton of Quiberon on 1 January 2022
Name	INSEE code	Intercommunality	Total area (km^{2})	Population (2014)	Density (per km^{2})
Quiberon (Canton seat)	56186	Auray Quiberon Terre Atlantique	8.83	4,963	562
Carnac	56034	Auray Quiberon Terre Atlantique	32.71	4,212	129
Belz	56013	Auray Quiberon Terre Atlantique	15.67	3,655	233
Erdeven	56054	Auray Quiberon Terre Atlantique	30.64	3,553	116
Locoal-Mendon	56119	Auray Quiberon Terre Atlantique	39.97	3,322	83
Ploemel	56161	Auray Quiberon Terre Atlantique	25.16	2,761	110
Le Palais	56152	CC of Belle-Île-en-Mer	17.43	2,580	148
Plouharnel	56168	Auray Quiberon Terre Atlantique	18.32	2,138	117
Saint-Pierre-Quiberon	56234	Auray Quiberon Terre Atlantique	7.54	2,101	279
Étel	56055	Auray Quiberon Terre Atlantique	1.74	1,948	1,120
La Trinité-sur-Mer	56258	Auray Quiberon Terre Atlantique	6.20	1,633	263
Bangor	56009	CC of Belle-Île-en-Mer	25.54	972	38
Sauzon	56241	CC of Belle-Île-en-Mer	22.11	932	42
Locmaria	56114	CC of Belle-Île-en-Mer	20.55	859	42
Île-d'Houat	56086	Auray Quiberon Terre Atlantique	2.91	242	83
Hœdic	56085	Auray Quiberon Terre Atlantique	2.08	113	54
Canton de Quiberon	5617		277.40	36,698 (2019)	132
