= Quessoy =

Quessoy Kesoue
- Commune
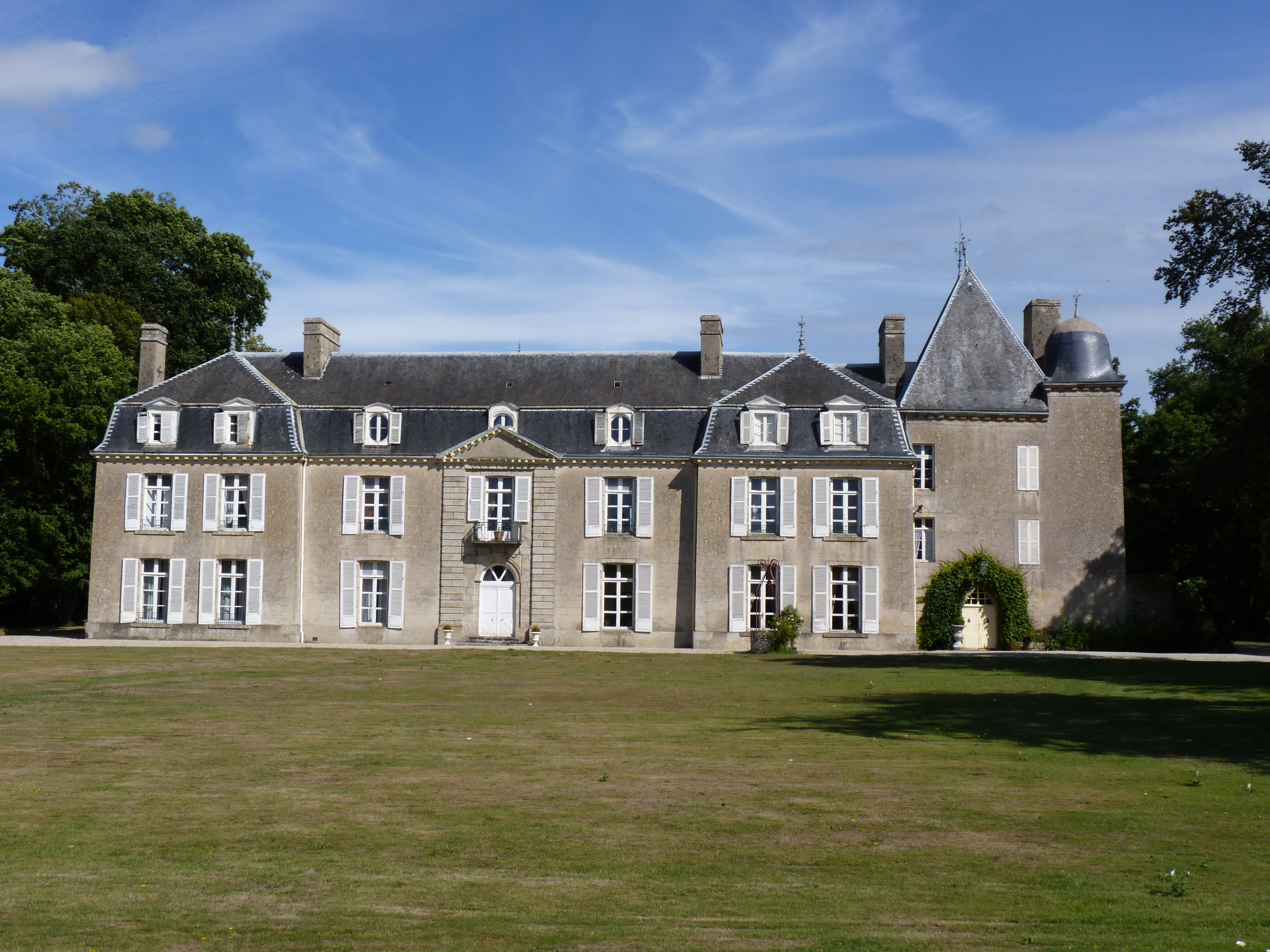
- The château of Bogard, in Quessoy
- Location of Quessoy
- Location within France Location within Brittany
- Coordinates: 48°25′19″N 2°39′25″W
- Country: France
- Region: Brittany
- Department: Côtes-d'Armor
- Arrondissement: Saint-Brieuc
- Canton: Plaintel
- Intercommunality: CA Lamballe Terre et Mer

Government
  - Mayor (2020–2026): Jean-Luc Gouyette
- Area^{1}: 29.23 km^{2} (11.29 sq mi)
- Highest elevation: 161 m (528 ft)
- Lowest elevation: 37 m (121 ft)
- Population (2023): 3,969
  - Density: 135.8/km^{2} (351.7/sq mi)
- Time zone: UTC+01:00 (CET)
  - Summer (DST): UTC+02:00 (CEST)
- INSEE/Postal code: 22258 /22120
- ^{1} French Land Register data, which excludes lakes, ponds, glaciers > 1 km^{2} (0.386 sq mi or 247 acres) and river estuaries.

Quessoy (French pronunciation: [kɛswa]; Breton: Kesoue) is a commune in the Côtes-d'Armor department of Brittany in north-western France.

== Population ==
Inhabitants of Quessoy are called quessoyais in French.

Historical population
Year	Pop.	±% p.a.
1968	2,006	—
1975	2,275	+1.81%
1982	2,864	+3.34%
1990	3,105	+1.02%
1999	3,184	+0.28%
2007	3,383	+0.76%
2012	3,694	+1.77%
2017	3,786	+0.49%
2023	3,969	+0.79%
Source: INSEE

== See also ==
- Communes of the Côtes-d'Armor department
- Élie Le Goff. Sculptor of Quessoy war memorial
