= Paul-François de Galluccio, marquis de L'Hôpital =

French noble and diplomat (1697–1767)

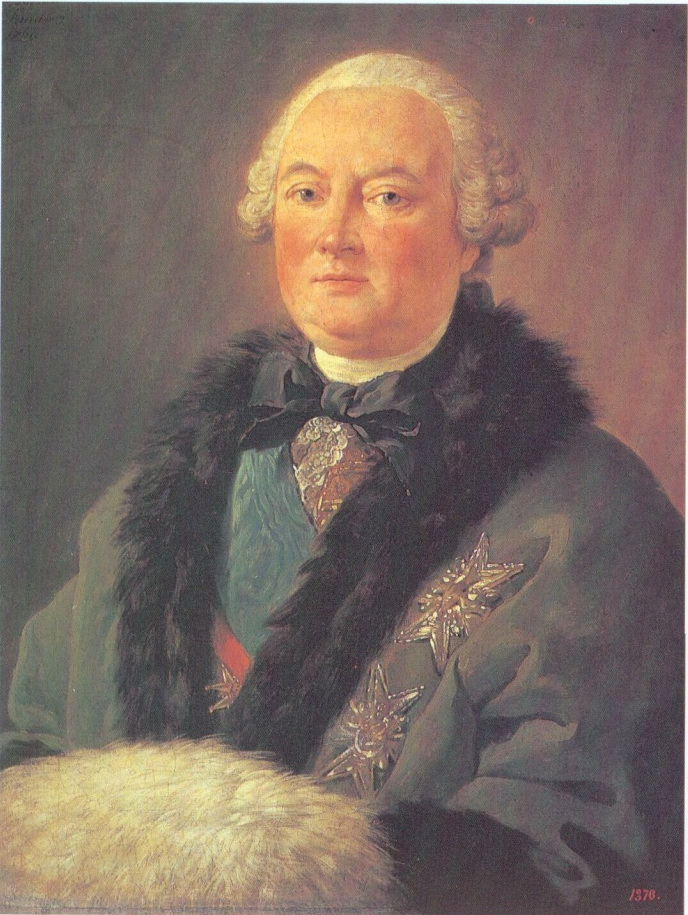
Paul-François de Galluccio, marquis de L'Hôpital by Louis-Jean-François Lagrenée, 1761 (Tretyakov Gallery).

Paul-François de Galluccio, marquis de L'Hôpital (13 January 1697 - 15 October 1767) was a French nobleman and ambassador to Russia from 1757 until 1760, when he was succeeded by Louis Auguste Le Tonnelier de Breteuil.

== Biography ==
He was from the old Neapolitan house of Gallucci or Galluccio. He entered the French Army in 1712 and had risen to 'Mestre-de-Camp' by 1739, when he was appointed ambassador extraordinary to the Kingdom of the Two Sicilies. He remained ambassador to the Two Sicilies until 1746.

In 1746, he became lieutenant-general and inspector-general of the cavalry and the dragoons. On 20 September 1746, he organised the defence against the British Raid on Lorient.
