= Belz, Morbihan =

Commune in Brittany, France

Belz
- Commune
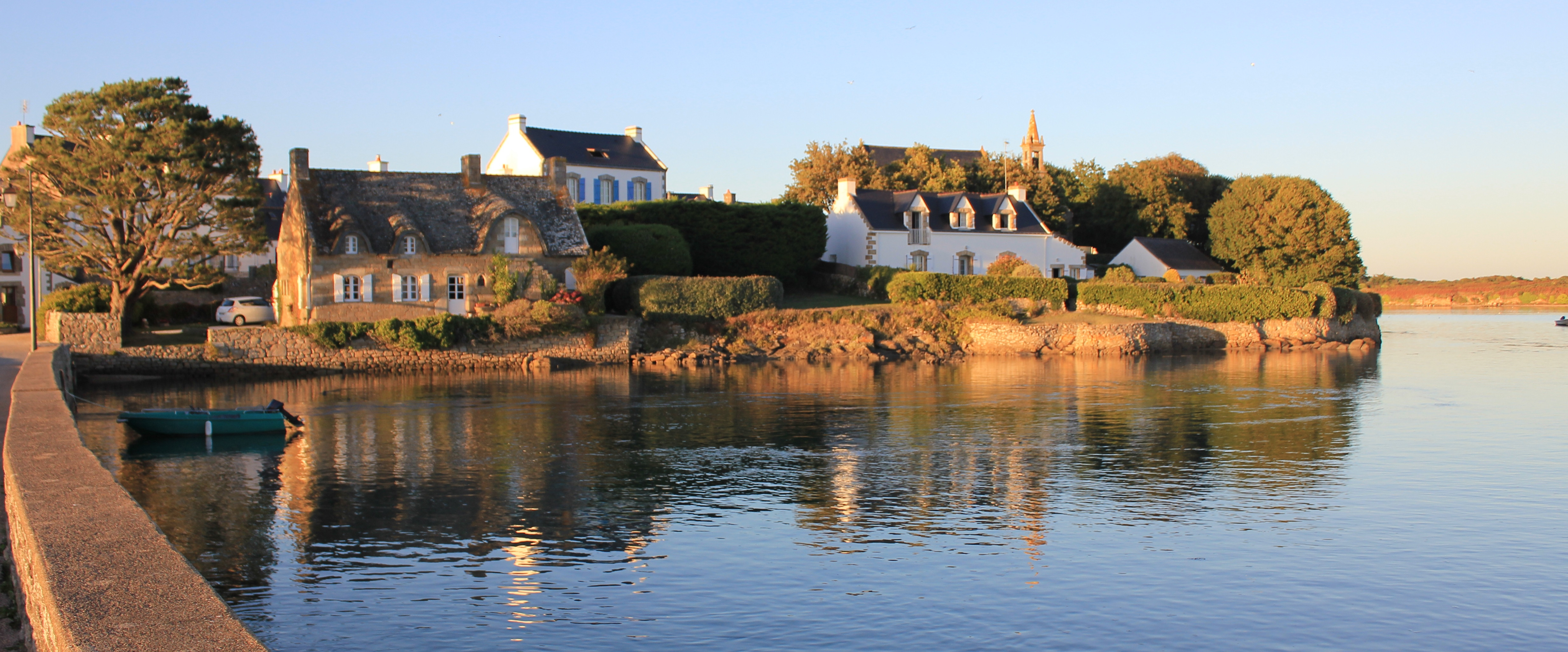

- Coat of arms
- Location of Belz
- Location within France Location within Brittany
- Coordinates: 47°40′37″N 3°10′06″W
- Country: France
- Region: Brittany
- Department: Morbihan
- Arrondissement: Lorient
- Canton: Quiberon
- Intercommunality: Auray Quiberon Terre Atlantique

Government
  - Mayor (2026–32): Sylvie Le Galliotte Le Bozec
- Area^{1}: 15.67 km^{2} (6.05 sq mi)
- Highest elevation: 33 m (108 ft)
- Lowest elevation: 0 m (0 ft)
- Population (2023): 3,893
  - Density: 248.4/km^{2} (643.4/sq mi)
- Time zone: UTC+01:00 (CET)
  - Summer (DST): UTC+02:00 (CEST)
- INSEE/Postal code: 56013 /56550
- ^{1} French Land Register data, which excludes lakes, ponds, glaciers > 1 km^{2} (0.386 sq mi or 247 acres) and river estuaries.

Belz (French pronunciation: [bɛls]; Breton: Belz) is a commune in the Morbihan département in Brittany in northwestern France.

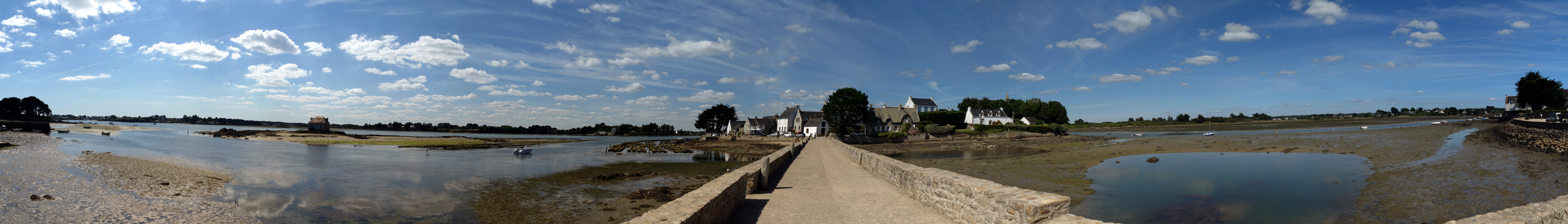
The island of Saint-Cado in Belz (July 2022)

== Population ==
Historical population
Year	Pop.	±% p.a.
1968	3,353	—
1975	3,398	+0.19%
1982	3,398	+0.00%
1990	3,372	−0.10%
1999	3,289	−0.28%
2007	3,440	+0.56%
2012	3,504	+0.37%
2017	3,711	+1.15%
2023	3,893	+0.80%
Source: INSEE

Inhabitants of Belz are called Belzois in French.

== See also ==
- Communes of the Morbihan department
- Élie Le Goff Article on the sculptor of Belz war memorial
