= Locoal-Mendon =

Commune in Brittany, France

Locoal-Mendon Lokoal-Mendon
- Commune
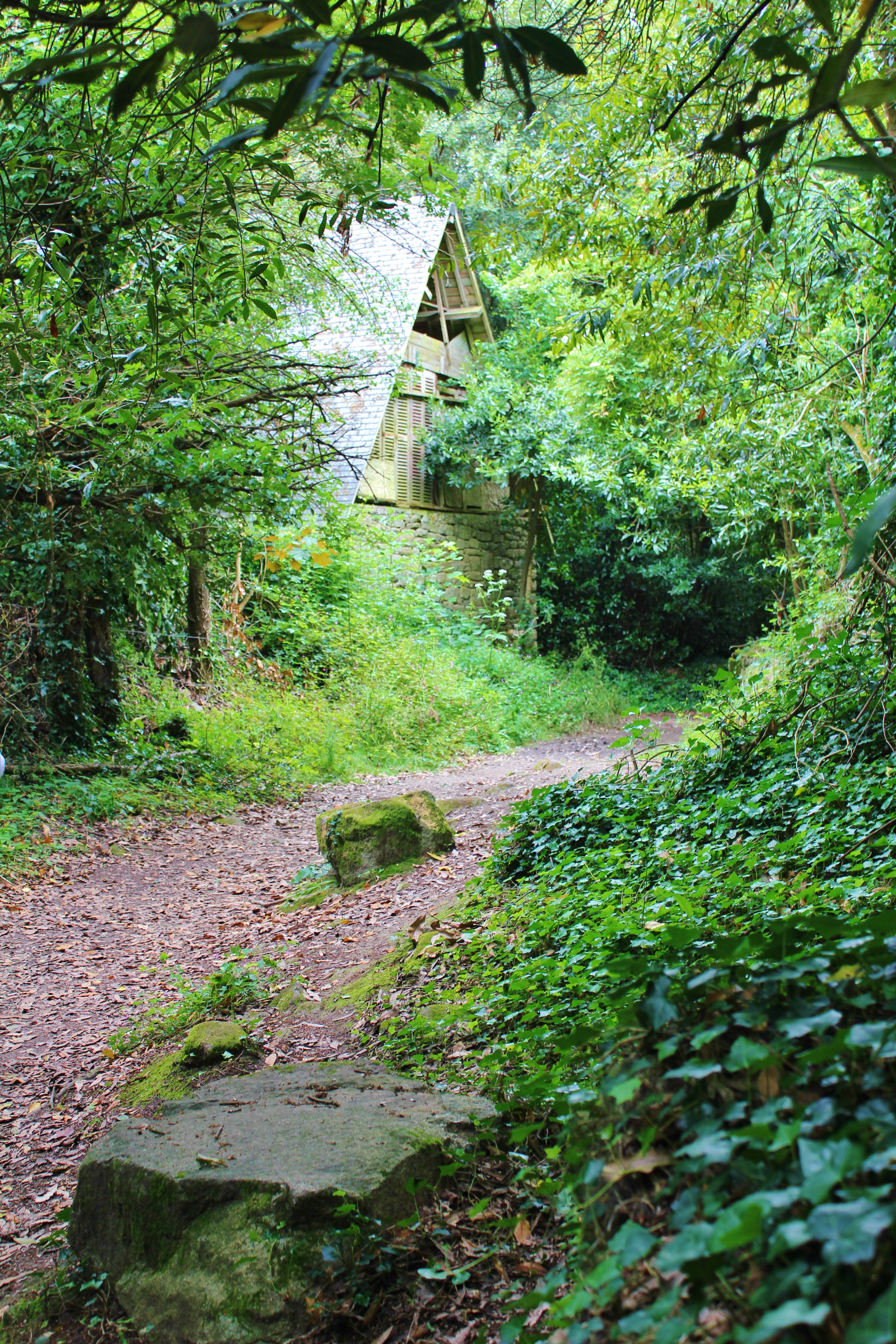
- The path of Cadoudal, in Locoal-Mendon
- Location of Locoal-Mendon
- Location within France Location within Brittany
- Coordinates: 47°42′45″N 3°06′14″W
- Country: France
- Region: Brittany
- Department: Morbihan
- Arrondissement: Lorient
- Canton: Quiberon
- Intercommunality: Auray Quiberon Terre Atlantique

Government
  - Mayor (2026–32): Jean-Maurice Majou
- Area^{1}: 37.50 km^{2} (14.48 sq mi)
- Highest elevation: 42 m (138 ft)
- Lowest elevation: 0 m (0 ft)
- Population (2023): 3,530
  - Density: 94.1/km^{2} (244/sq mi)
- Time zone: UTC+01:00 (CET)
  - Summer (DST): UTC+02:00 (CEST)
- INSEE/Postal code: 56119 /56550
- ^{1} French Land Register data, which excludes lakes, ponds, glaciers > 1 km^{2} (0.386 sq mi or 247 acres) and river estuaries.

Locoal-Mendon (French pronunciation: [lɔkwal mɛ̃dɔ̃]; Breton: Lokoal-Mendon) is a commune in the Morbihan department of Brittany in north-western France.

== Toponymy ==
Known as Locus Sancti Guitali in 1037 and Sanctus Gudualus in 1387. From the Breton lok which means hermitage (cf.: Locminé), and Goal which is a name for the Breton saint Gudwal, Gurval or Gutual, eponym also of Gulval. Mendon is derives probably from the Breton men which means rock and don which means deep.

== Population ==
Historical population
Year	Pop.	±% p.a.
1968	1,750	—
1975	1,665	−0.71%
1982	1,881	+1.76%
1990	2,080	+1.26%
1999	2,182	+0.53%
2007	3,033	+4.20%
2012	3,241	+1.34%
2017	3,416	+1.06%
2023	3,530	+0.55%
Source: INSEE

== Breton language ==
In 2008, there was 17,81% of the children attended the bilingual schools in primary education.

== See also ==
- Communes of the Morbihan department
