= Étel =

Commune in Brittany, France

Étel An Intel
- Commune
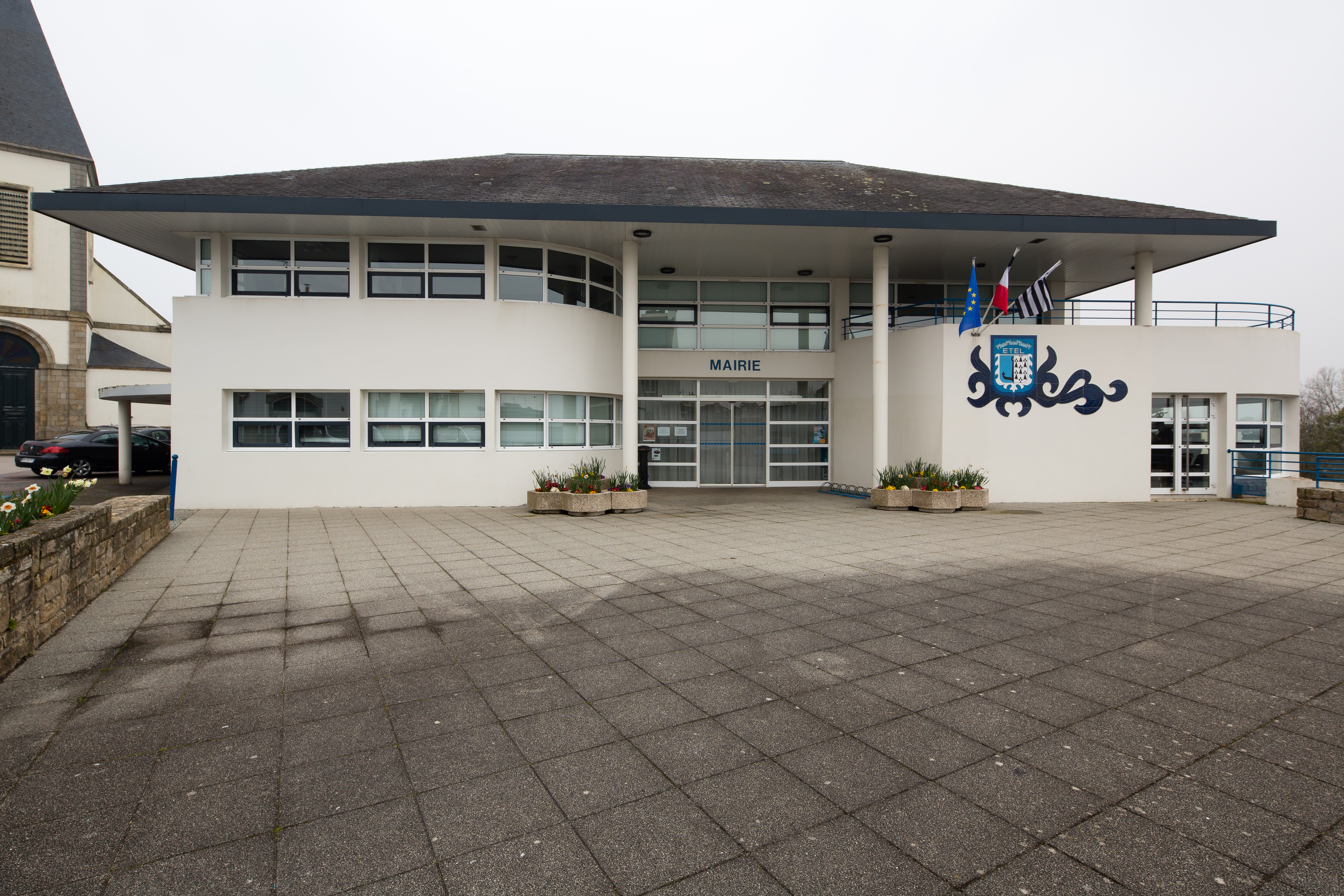
- The town hall in Étel

- Coat of arms
- Location of Étel
- Location within France Location within Brittany
- Coordinates: 47°39′30″N 3°11′58″W
- Country: France
- Region: Brittany
- Department: Morbihan
- Arrondissement: Lorient
- Canton: Quiberon
- Intercommunality: Auray Quiberon Terre Atlantique

Government
  - Mayor (2026–32): Yvan Jolivel-Robert
- Area^{1}: 1.74 km^{2} (0.67 sq mi)
- Highest elevation: 17 m (56 ft)
- Lowest elevation: 0 m (0 ft)
- Population (2023): 2,074
  - Density: 1,190/km^{2} (3,090/sq mi)
- Time zone: UTC+01:00 (CET)
  - Summer (DST): UTC+02:00 (CEST)
- INSEE/Postal code: 56055 /56410
- ^{1} French Land Register data, which excludes lakes, ponds, glaciers > 1 km^{2} (0.386 sq mi or 247 acres) and river estuaries.

Étel (French pronunciation: [etɛl]; Breton: An Intel) is a commune in the Morbihan department of Brittany in north-western France.

== Population ==
Historical population
Year	Pop.	±% p.a.
1968	3,074	—
1975	2,762	−1.52%
1982	2,445	−1.73%
1990	2,318	−0.66%
1999	2,165	−0.76%
2007	2,042	−0.73%
2012	2,040	−0.02%
2017	1,971	−0.69%
2023	2,074	+0.85%
Source: INSEE

Inhabitants of Étel are called in French Étellois.

== La Glacière d’Étel ==
Once a bustling fishing port, La Glacière, or the ice house, reflects the town's maritime heritage. Erected in 1946, La Glacière d’Étel helped to produce ice for the local port, supporting the needs of a fishing fleet that, until the 1950s, comprised 250 sailing boats primarily engaged in tuna fishing. The building, the last remaining ice house in Morbihan, Brittany, fell into disrepair after its heyday. However, local authorities have undertaken its restoration.

According to Étienne, a representative involved in the restoration project, "The main objective of our project is to welcome the public." La Glacière hosts exhibitions, with the current one dedicated to maritime energy in Brittany. A tidal turbine and a heat pump are integral to harnessing the sea's energy, with a focus on utilizing local energy sources.

Aurélien Bertin, advisor to La Glacière d’Étel Energy Project at VALOEN, states, "We are going to use as a priority here at La Glacière all the sources of energy that we can find here nearby." The sea becomes a pivotal source, with seawater serving a dual purpose. The tidal turbine harnesses the sea's current to generate electricity, while a seawater heat pump taps into the relatively constant temperature of seawater throughout the year to recuperate calories for heating the building—a process akin to an inverted fridge.

In a nod to sustainability, the curved roof of La Glacière is adorned with innovative biodegradable and flexible solar panels, a product of design ingenuity from Nantes. Surplus energy generated will be shared with local municipal buildings, reinforcing a commitment to community-wide benefits.

The La Glacière energy project is supported by nearly €166,000 in European funding.

== See also ==
- Communes of the Morbihan department
