= Houat =

Island and commune in Brittany, France

Île-d'Houat Enez-Houad
- Commune
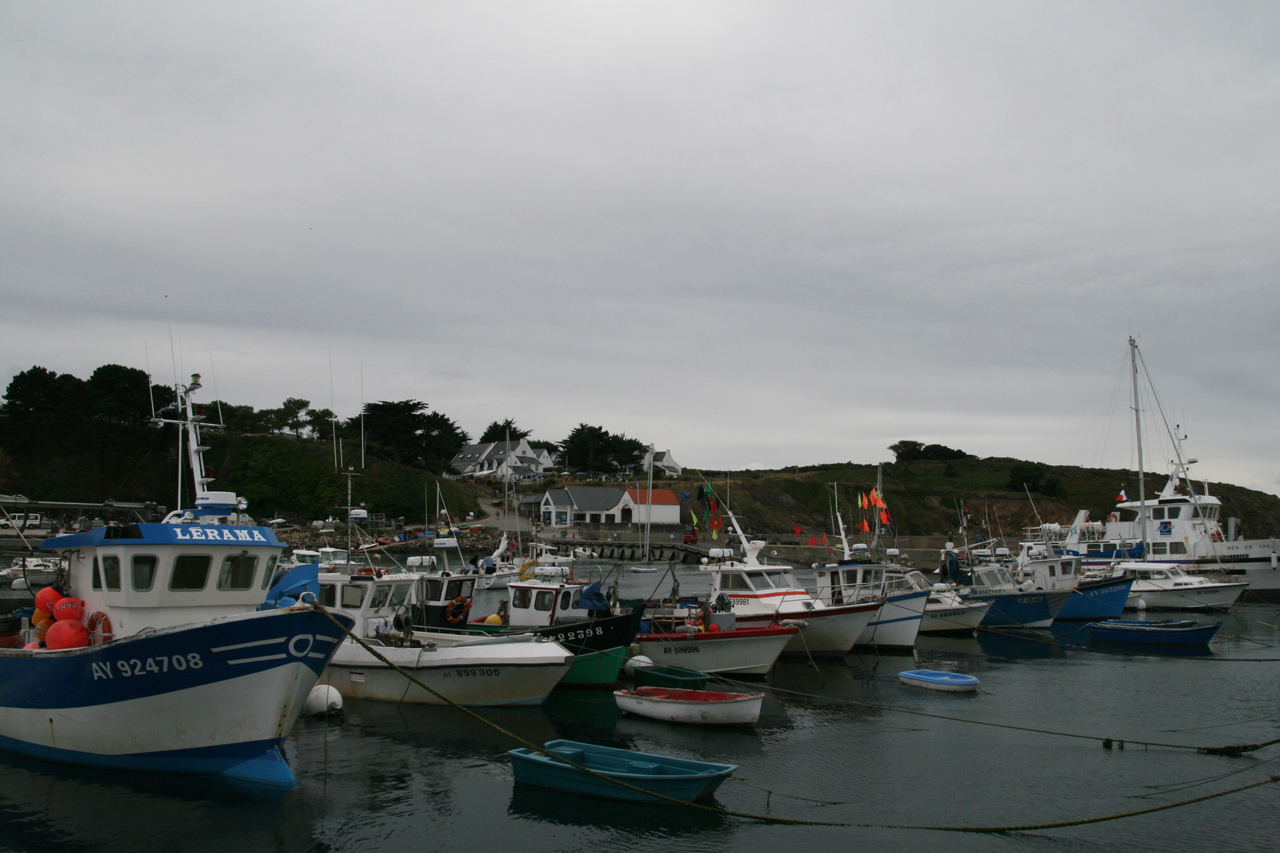
- The harbour in Houat

- Coat of arms
- Location of Île-d'Houat
- Location within France Location within Brittany
- Coordinates: 47°23′25″N 2°57′22″W
- Country: France
- Region: Brittany
- Department: Morbihan
- Arrondissement: Lorient
- Canton: Quiberon

Government
  - Mayor (2026–32): Philippe Le Fur
- Area^{1}: 2.91 km^{2} (1.12 sq mi)
- Elevation: 27 m (89 ft)
- Highest elevation: 42 m (138 ft)
- Lowest elevation: 0 m (0 ft)
- Population (2023): 219
  - Density: 75.3/km^{2} (195/sq mi)
- Time zone: UTC+01:00 (CET)
  - Summer (DST): UTC+02:00 (CEST)
- INSEE/Postal code: 56086 /56170
- ^{1} French Land Register data, which excludes lakes, ponds, glaciers > 1 km^{2} (0.386 sq mi or 247 acres) and river estuaries.

Houat (Breton: Enez Houad; French: Île-d'Houat, French pronunciation: [il dwat]) is a French island off the south coast of Brittany in the department of Morbihan. It is located, along with two other major islands, in the entrance to the Baie de Quiberon. Its "twin sister" island is Hoëdic.

Administratively, Île-d'Houat is a commune of the Morbihan department.

== Geography ==
Houat is 5 km (3.1 mi) long, and 1.5 km (0.93 mi) across at the widest point. The island is mostly granite cliffs except for a long beach lined with dunes on the eastern coast.

== Demographics ==
Inhabitants of Île-d'Houat are called Houatais.

== Miscellaneous ==
Houat is the setting for Iain Pears' 2005 novel The Portrait.

== See also ==
- Communes of the Morbihan department
