= Hœdic =

Island and commune in Brittany, France

Hœdic Edig
- Commune
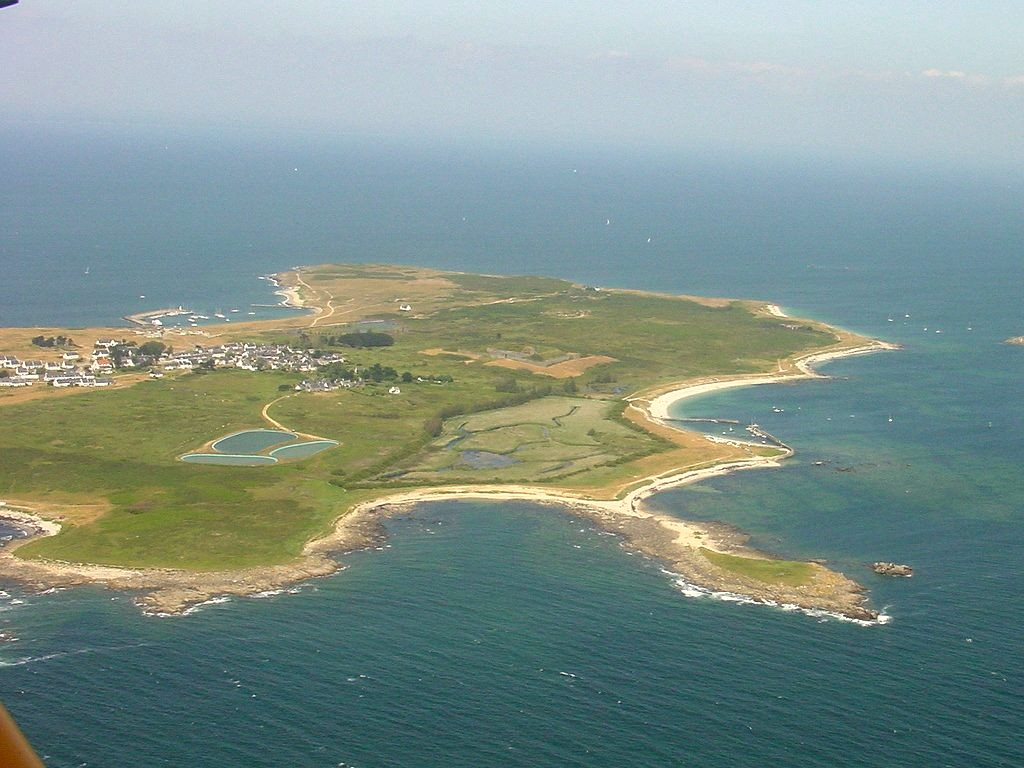
- An aerial view of Hœdic

- Flag Coat of arms
- Location of Hœdic
- Location within France Location within Brittany
- Coordinates: 47°20′25″N 2°52′40″W
- Country: France
- Region: Brittany
- Department: Morbihan
- Arrondissement: Lorient
- Canton: Quiberon

Government
  - Mayor (2026–32): Jean-Luc Chiffoleau
- Area^{1}: 2.08 km^{2} (0.80 sq mi)
- Elevation: 14 m (46 ft)
- Highest elevation: 22 m (72 ft)
- Lowest elevation: 0 m (0 ft)
- Population (2023): 104
  - Density: 50.0/km^{2} (129/sq mi)
- Time zone: UTC+01:00 (CET)
  - Summer (DST): UTC+02:00 (CEST)
- INSEE/Postal code: 56085 /56170
- ^{1} French Land Register data, which excludes lakes, ponds, glaciers > 1 km^{2} (0.386 sq mi or 247 acres) and river estuaries.

Hœdic or Hoëdic (French pronunciation: [edik]; Breton: Edig) is an island off the south coast of Brittany in northwestern France. Its bigger "twin sister" island is Houat.

Administratively, Hœdic is a commune in the Morbihan department.

== Geography ==
Hœdic is located in the heart of Mor Braz, a bay in the Atlantic Ocean off the south coast of Brittany (Rhuys and Quiberon peninsulas), 13 km (8.1 miles) east of Belle-Île and 5 km (3.1 miles) southeast of Houat. It is part of a line of granite crests that includes the Le Croisic peninsula, Dumet Island, Houat, Quiberon, and Groix.

Hœdic is a low, undulating plateau, 800 metres (2,600 ft) wide by 2,500 metres (8,200 ft) long. Its peak, at an altitude of 22 metres (72 ft), is located in the middle of its eastern part, on the road that leads from the village to the hamlet of the Phare. The island's base consists essentially of granite and less often of schists. The coast is an alternation of sandy coves and rocky points of variable height, generally more marked to the north (Beg Lagat, the Old Castle) than to the south (Beg Er Faut, Kasperakiz). There are two marshes, one modest, behind the dune of the new harbor, the other about twenty hectares behind the dune of the old port. In addition to the main island, the town has several small islands, including Roc'h Melen, Madavoar, the Cardinals, and Mulons.

== Human geography ==
Hœdic has long been associated with familial polyculture of livestock and crops—that is, in farms owned by people and families rather than heavily industrialised farms—along with their fishing resources. Agriculture disappeared in the middle of the 20th century, while fishing had a second wind in the 1980s but is currently declining. Currently, Hœdic is largely dependent on tourism, even more significantly than its neighbour Houat. Similar to Houat, the majority of its land is being invaded by brush.

Hœdic is a car-free island with around 100 inhabitants in the wintertime. During the summer, its population can reach 3,000, including boaters, tourists, and campers coming to the island. The island is connected to the mainland via Compagnie Océane boats year-round and Compagnie des Iles boats during the tourist season (connections from Quiberon).

== Demographics ==
Inhabitants of Hœdic are called Hœdicais.

== See also ==
- Communes of the Morbihan department
