= Les Sables-Blancs halt =

French railway halt

Les Sables Blancs
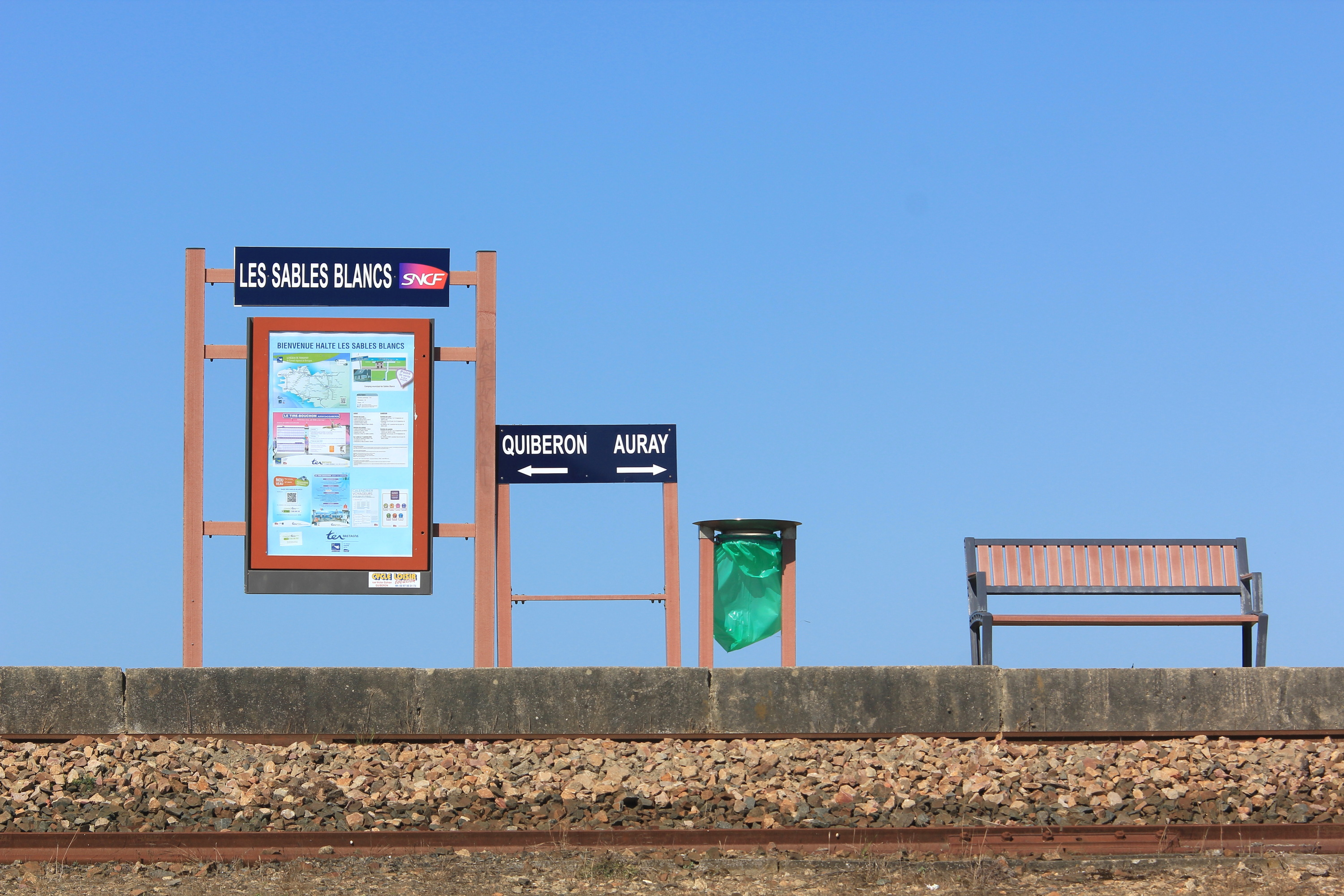
- Les Sables-Blancs railway station

General information
- Location: 56340 Plouharnel; Morbihan; France
- Coordinates: 47°34′31″N 3°07′56″W
- Line: Auray–Quiberon railway
- Distance: 601.710 km
- Platforms: 1
- Tracks: 1

Other information
- Station code: 87476267

History
- Opened: 1 July 1985

Passengers
- 2018: 225

Services
Preceding station	TER Bretagne	Following station
Plouharnel-Carnac towards Auray	32 Seasonal service	Penthièvre towards Quiberon
Location

Les Sables Blancs halt (French: Halte des Sables-Blancs) is a railway halt situated at the entrance to the Quiberon peninsula in the commune of Plouharnel, Morbihan department of Brittany, France. The halt is located at kilometric point (KP) 601.710 on the Auray–Quiberon railway. The station is served seasonally during summer months only by TER Bretagne services operated by the SNCF, between Auray and Quiberon.

== History ==
In 2018, the SNCF recorded 225 passenger movements at the halt.
