= Kerhostin station =

Railway station in Saint-Pierre-Quiberon, France

Kerhostin
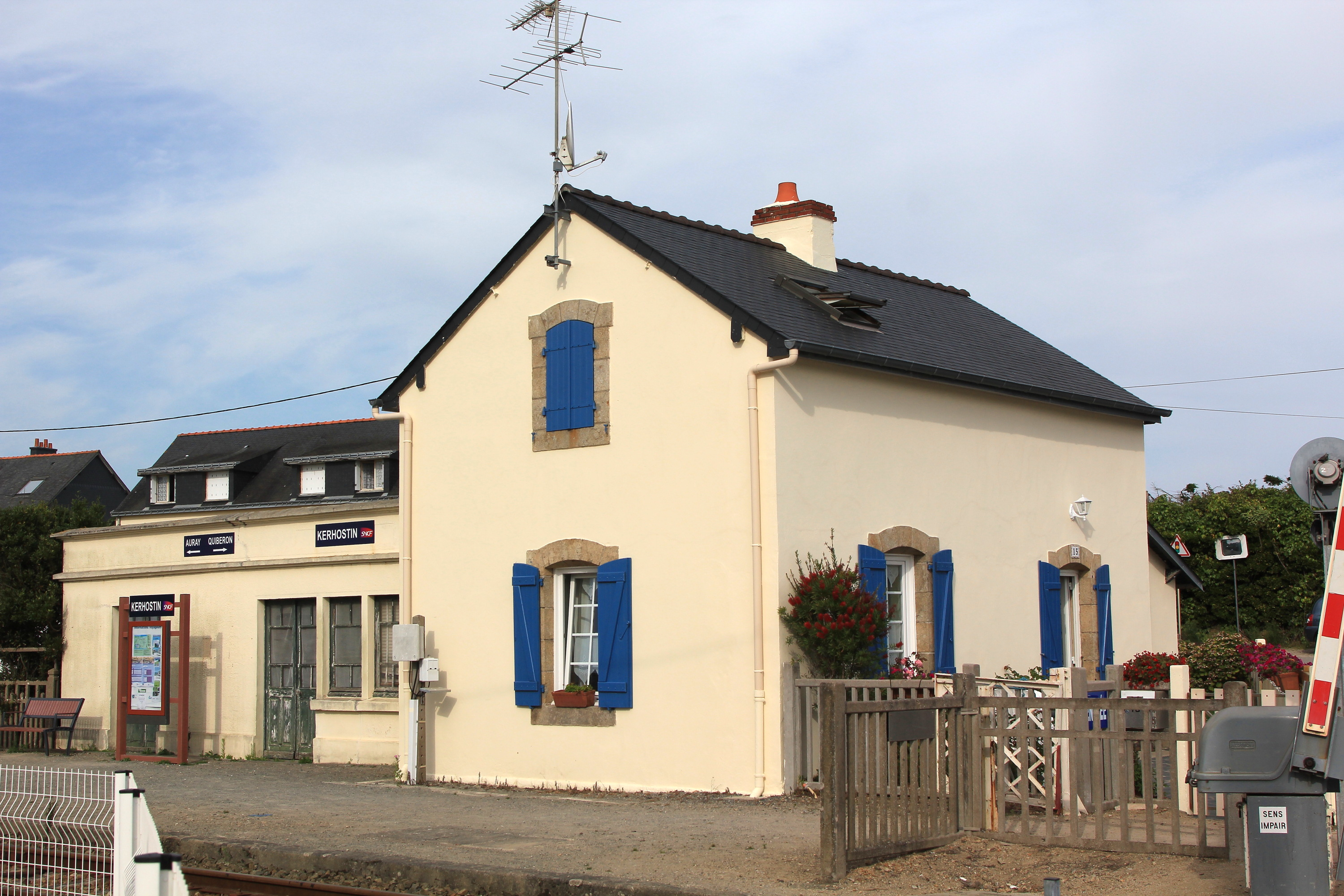

General information
- Location: 56510 Saint-Pierre-Quiberon; Morbihan; France
- Coordinates: 47°32′11″N 3°08′11″W
- Line(s): Auray–Quiberon railway
- Platforms: 1
- Tracks: 1

Other information
- Station code: 87476432

History
- Opened: 23 July 1882

Passengers
- 2018: 1,411

Services
Preceding station	TER Bretagne	Following station
L'Isthme towards Auray	32 Seasonal service	Saint-Pierre-Quiberon towards Quiberon
Location

Kerhostin (French: Gare de Kerhostin) is a railway station in the village of Kerhostin in the commune of Saint-Pierre-Quiberon, Morbihan department of France. The station was opened on 23 July 1882, and is located on the Auray–Quiberon railway. The station is served seasonally during summer months only by TER Bretagne services operated by the SNCF, between Auray and Quiberon.

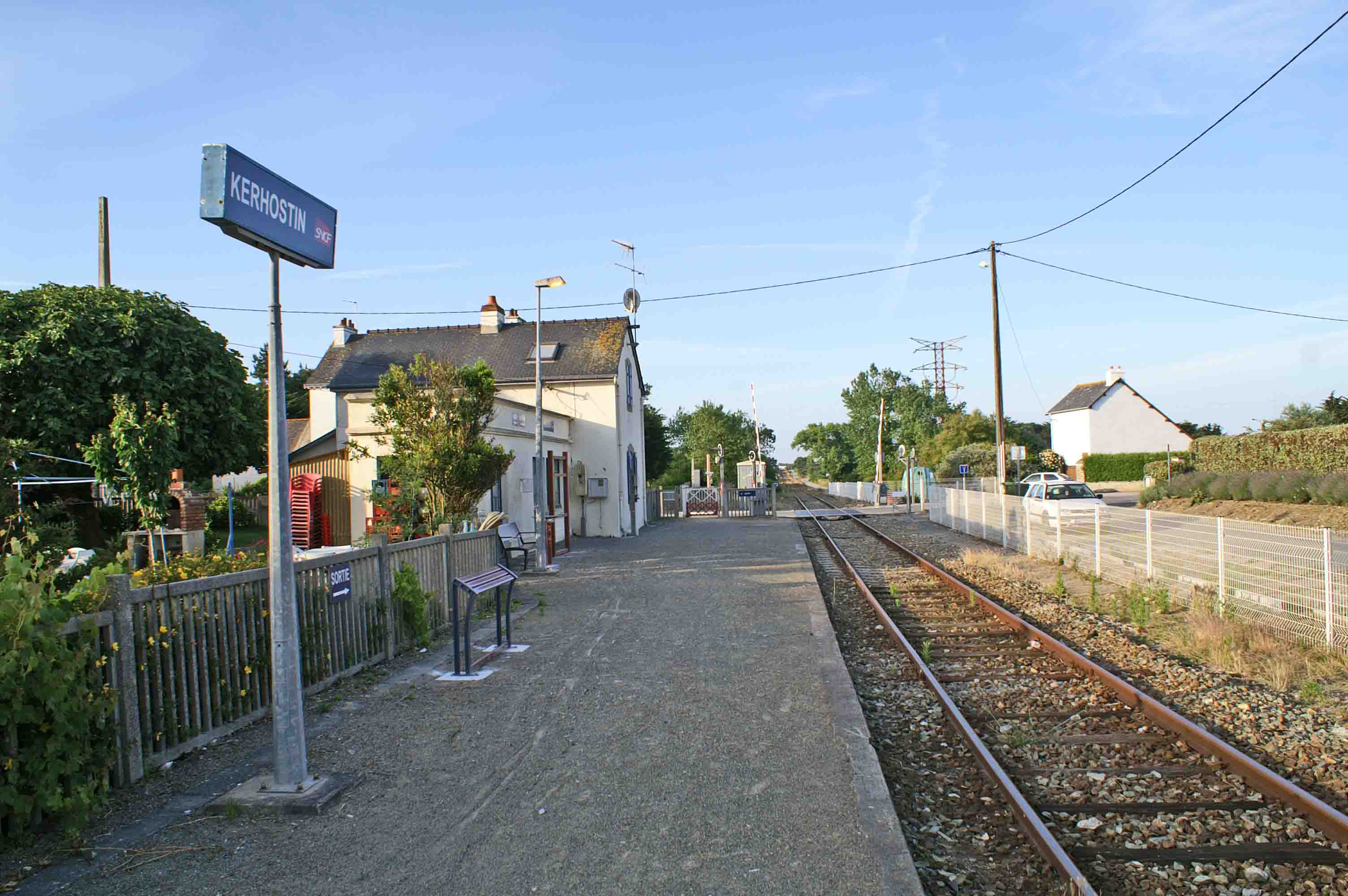
Station platform in 2010
