= Isthme halt =

Railway station in Saint-Pierre-Quiberon, France

L'Isthme
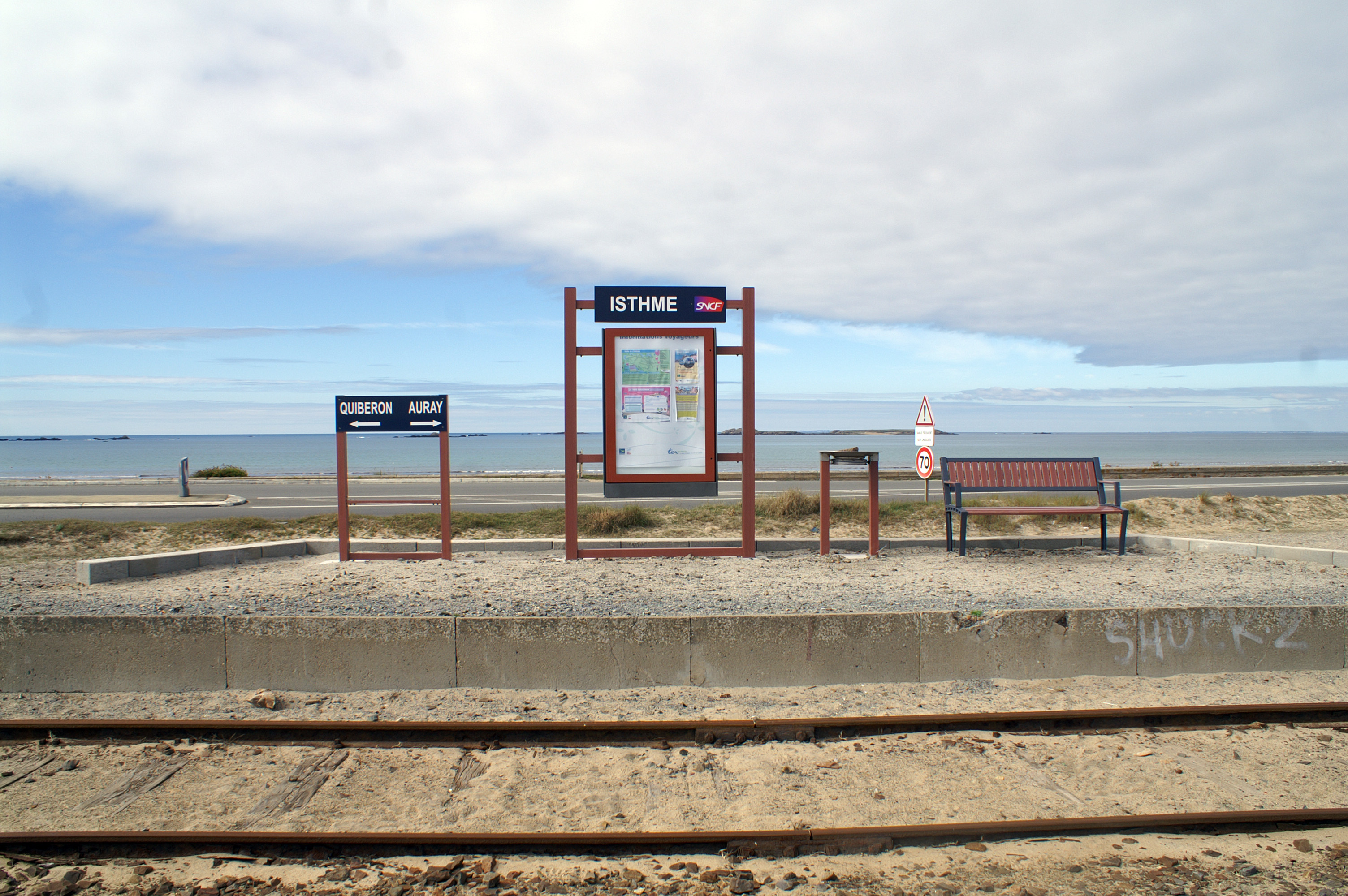

General information
- Location: 56510 Saint-Pierre-Quiberon; Morbihan; France
- Coordinates: 47°32′49″N 3°08′01″W
- Line(s): Auray–Quiberon railway
- Platforms: 1
- Tracks: 1

Other information
- Station code: 87476275

Services
Preceding station	TER Bretagne	Following station
Penthièvre towards Auray	32 Seasonal service	Kerhostin towards Quiberon
Location

Isthme halt (French: Halte de L'Isthme) is a railway halt in Saint-Pierre-Quiberon, Morbihan department of Brittany, France. The halt is situated within close proximity of the Fort of Penthièvre. It is located at kilometric point (KP) 605.000 on the Auray–Quiberon railway. The halt is served seasonally during summer months only by TER Bretagne services operated by the SNCF, between Auray and Quiberon.

== See also ==
- List of SNCF stations in Brittany
