= Penthièvre station =

Railway station in Saint-Pierre-Quiberon, France

Penthièvre
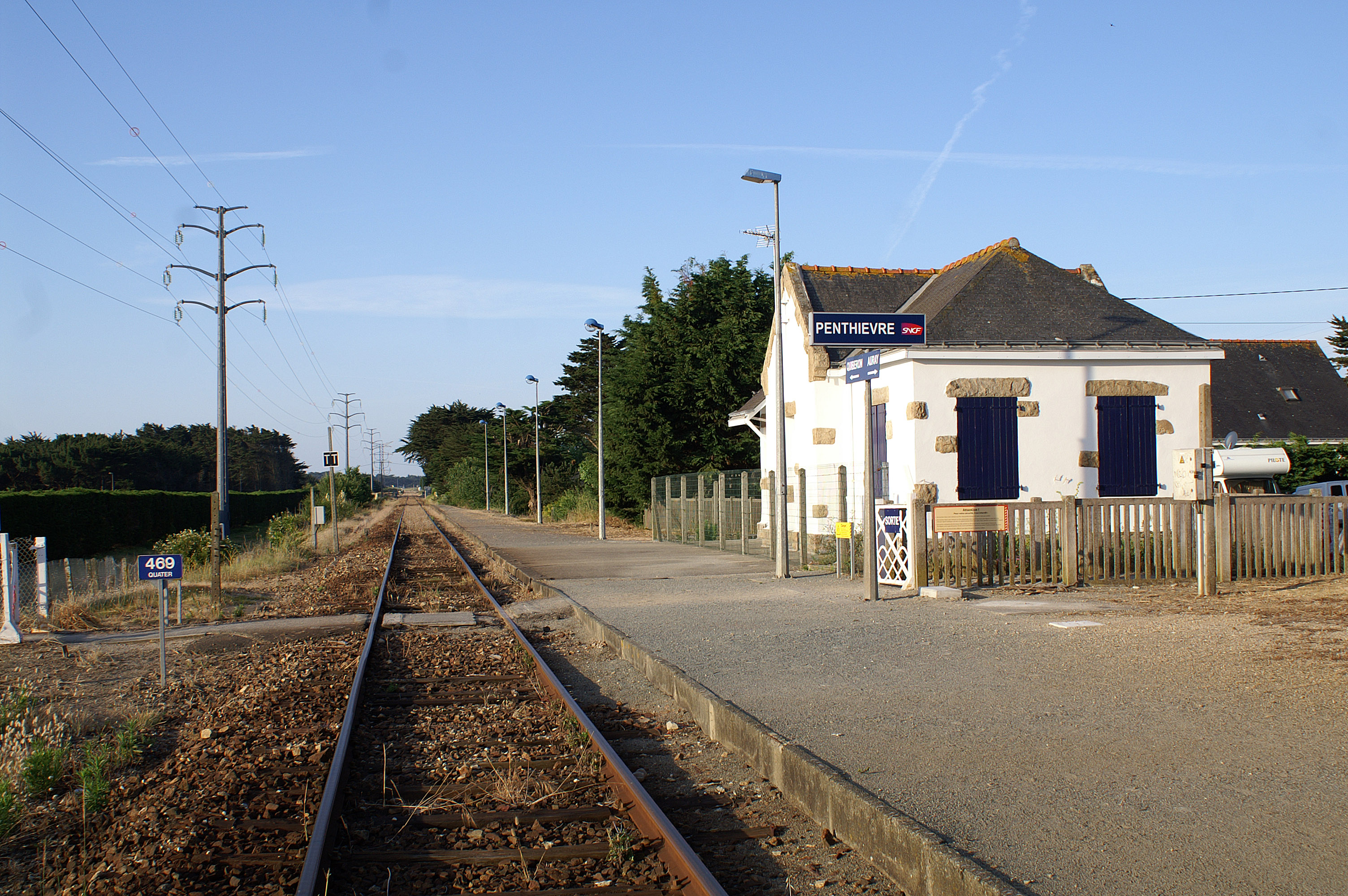
- Penthièvre railway station

General information
- Location: 56510 Saint-Pierre-Quiberon; Morbihan; France
- Coordinates: 47°33′29″N 3°07′59″W
- Owner: SNCF
- Operator: SNCF
- Line: Auray–Quiberon railway
- Platforms: 1
- Tracks: 1

Other information
- Station code: 87476424

History
- Opened: 1909 as a stop

Passengers
- 2018: 970

Services
Preceding station	TER Bretagne	Following station
Les Sables-Blancs towards Auray	32 Seasonal service	L'Isthme towards Quiberon
Location

Penthièvre (French: Gare de Penthièvre) is a railway station in Saint-Pierre-Quiberon, Morbihan department of Brittany, France. The station was opened on 23 July 1882, and is located on the Auray–Quiberon railway. The station is served seasonally during summer months only by TER Bretagne services operated by the SNCF, between Auray and Quiberon.

== History ==
When the Compagnie du Chemin de fer de Paris à Orléans opened the Aurey-Quiberon railway on 24 July 1882, trains didn't stop at Penthièvre.

In 2018, SNCF estimated the 970 passengers passed through the station.
