= Plouharnel–Carnac station =

French railway station

Plouharnel–Carnac Plouharnel–Karnag
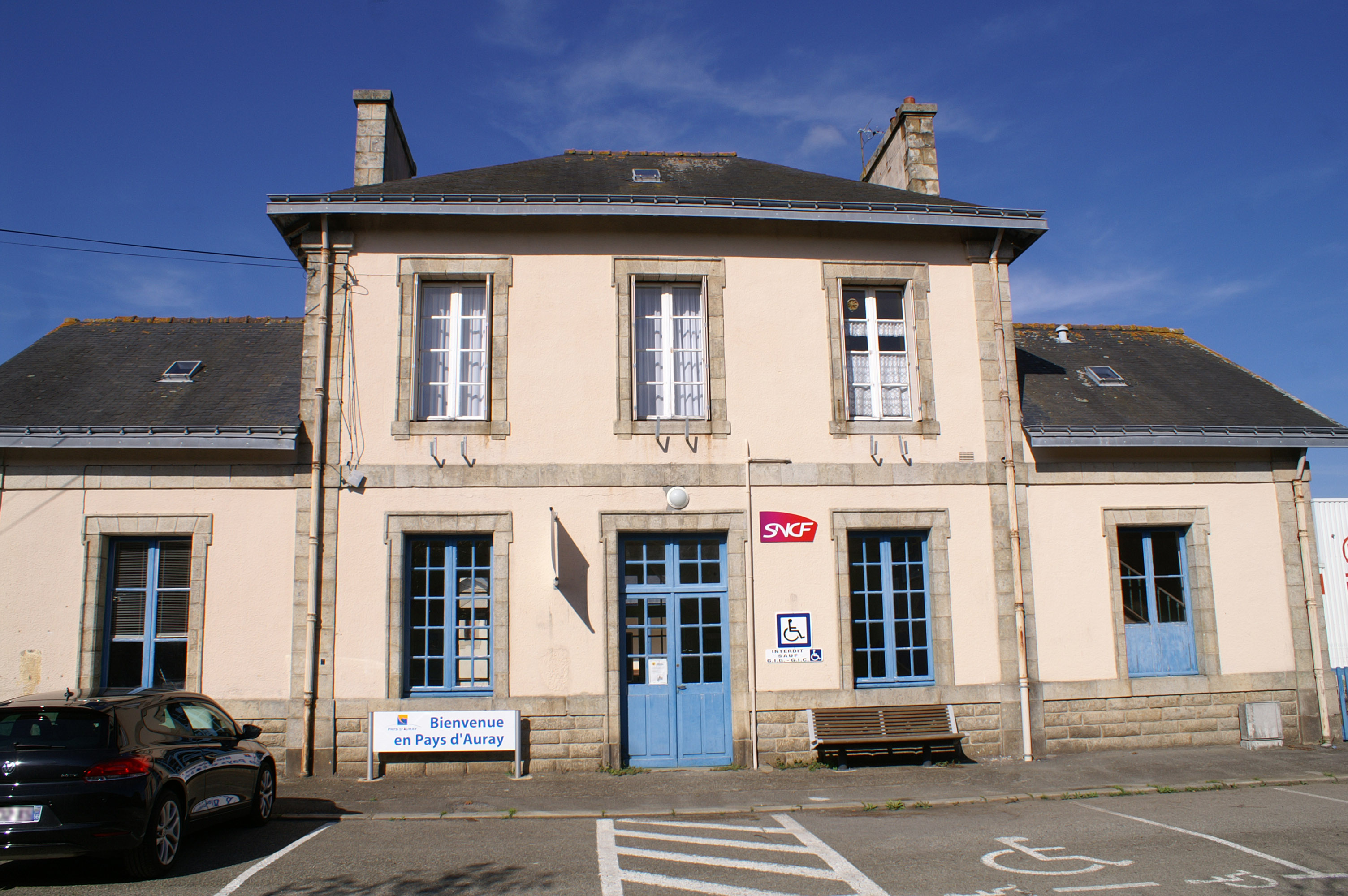
- Plouharnel–Carnac railway station

General information
- Location: Rue de la Gare; 56340 Plouharnel; Morbihan; France
- Coordinates: 47°36′16″N 3°07′07″W
- Line: Auray–Quiberon railway
- Platforms: 2
- Tracks: 2

Other information
- Station code: 87476416

History
- Opened: 23 July 1882

Services
Preceding station	TER Bretagne	Following station
Belz-Ploemel towards Auray	32 Seasonal service	Les Sables-Blancs towards Quiberon
Location

Plouharnel–Carnac (French: Gare de Plouharnel–Carnac; Breton: Ti-gar Plouharnel–Karnag) is a railway station in Plouharnel, Brittany, France. The station was opened on 23 July 1882, and is located on the Auray–Quiberon railway. The station is served seasonally during summer months only by TER Bretagne services operated by the SNCF, between Auray and Quiberon.
