= Saint-Pierre-Quiberon station =

Railway station in Saint-Pierre-Quiberon, France

Saint-Pierre-Quiberon Sant Per-Kiberen
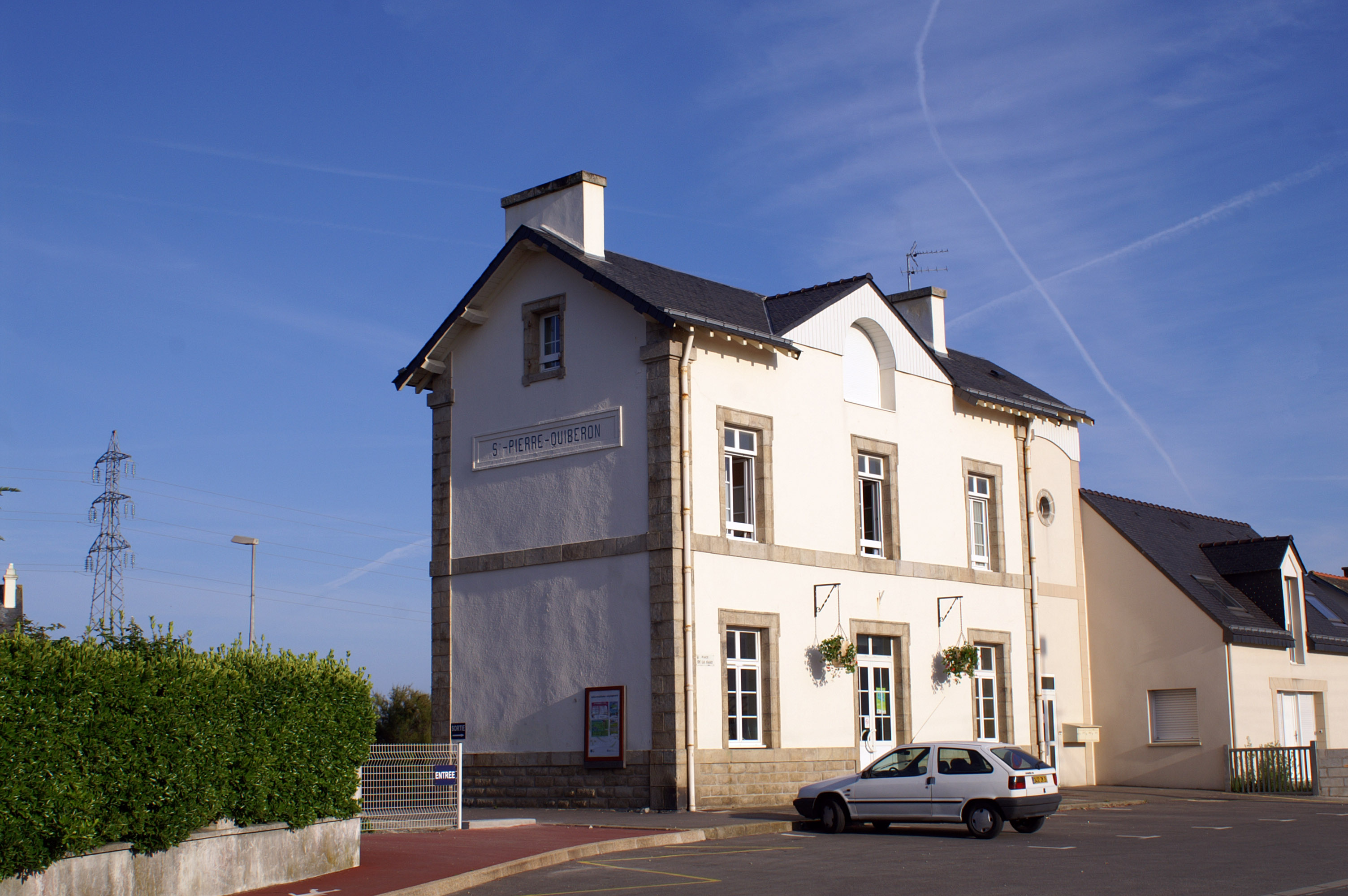
- Saint-Pierre-Quiberon railway station

General information
- Location: Place de la Gare; 56510 Saint-Pierre-Quiberon; Morbihan; France
- Coordinates: 47°31′15″N 3°08′19″W
- Line: Auray–Quiberon railway
- Platforms: 1
- Tracks: 1

Other information
- Station code: 87476440

History
- Opened: 23 July 1882

Services
Preceding station	TER Bretagne	Following station
Kerhostin towards Auray	32 Seasonal service	Quiberon Terminus
Location

Saint-Pierre-Quiberon (French: Gare de Saint-Pierre-Quiberon; Breton: Ti-gar Sant Per-Kiberen) is a railway station in Saint-Pierre-Quiberon, Brittany, France. The station was opened on 23 July 1882, and is located on the Auray–Quiberon railway. The station is served seasonally during summer months only by TER Bretagne services operated by the SNCF, between Auray and Quiberon.

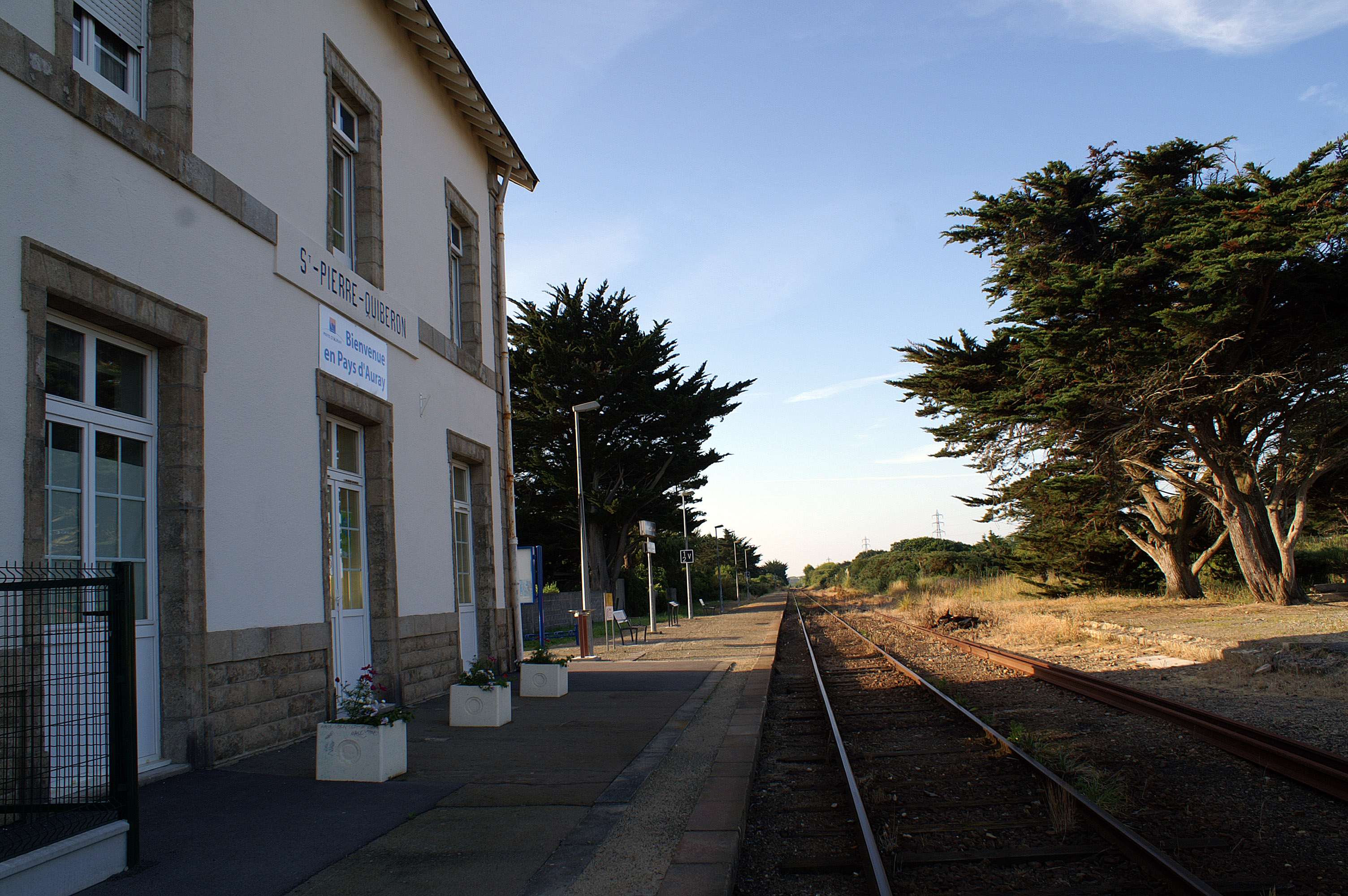
Saint-Pierre-Quiberon station
