= Belz–Ploemel station =

Railway station in Ploemel, France

Belz–Ploemel Belz–Pleñver
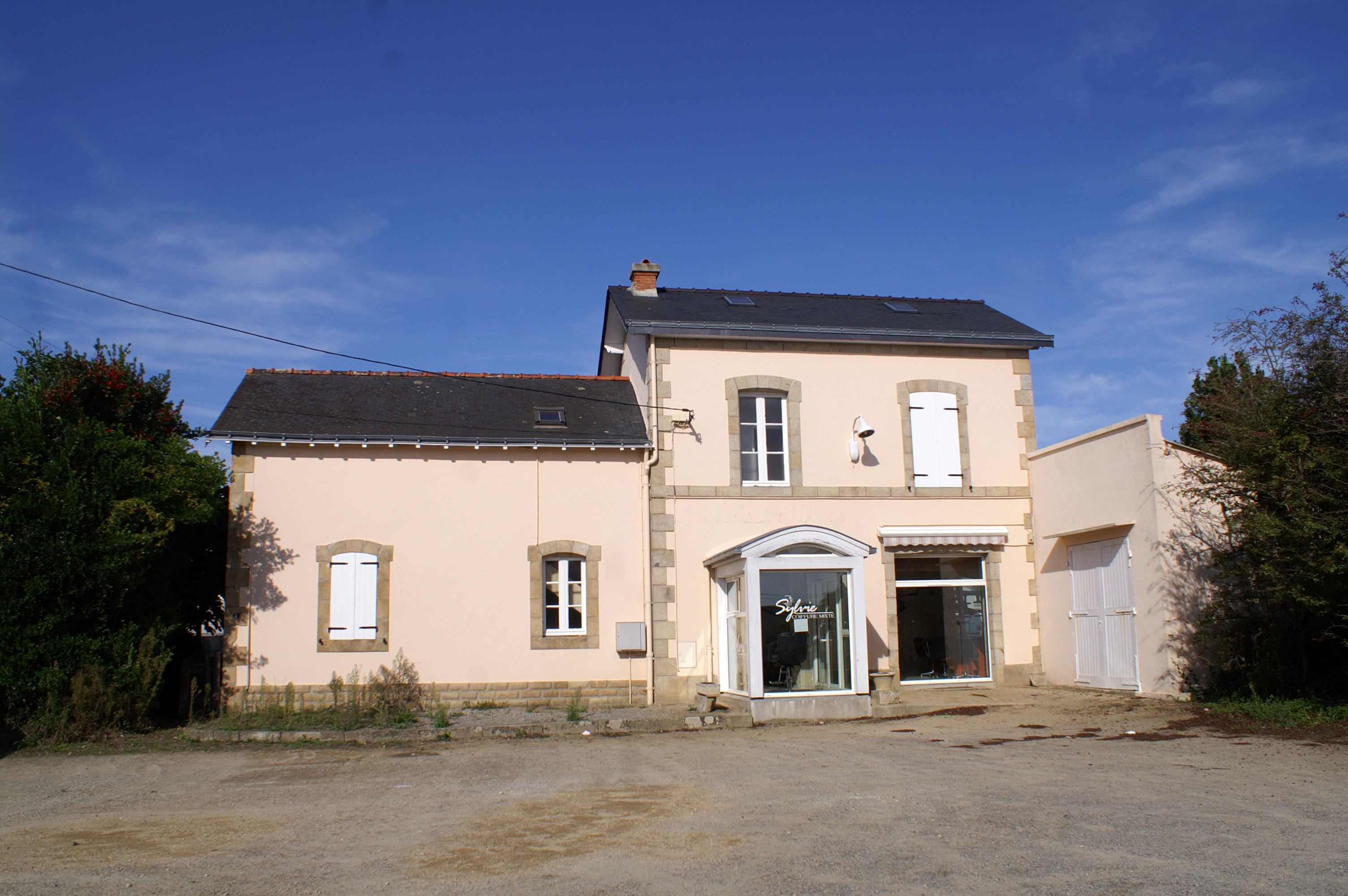
- Belz–Ploemel railway station

General information
- Location: Rue de la Gare; 56400 Ploemel; Morbihan; France
- Coordinates: 47°39′10″N 3°04′19″W
- Line: Auray–Quiberon railway
- Distance: 591.577 km
- Platforms: 1
- Tracks: 1

Other information
- Station code: 87476408

History
- Opened: 24 July 1882

Passengers
- 2018: 1,127

Services
Preceding station	TER Bretagne	Following station
Auray Terminus	32 Seasonal service	Plouharnel-Carnac towards Quiberon
Location

Belz–Ploemel station (French: Gare de Belz–Ploemel; Breton: Ti-gar Belz–Pleñver) is a railway station in Ploemel, Brittany, France. The station was opened on 24 July 1882, and is located at kilometric point (KP) 591.577 on the Auray–Quiberon railway. The station also serves the town of Belz. The station is served seasonally during summer months only by TER Bretagne services operated by the SNCF, between Auray and Quiberon.

== Gallery ==
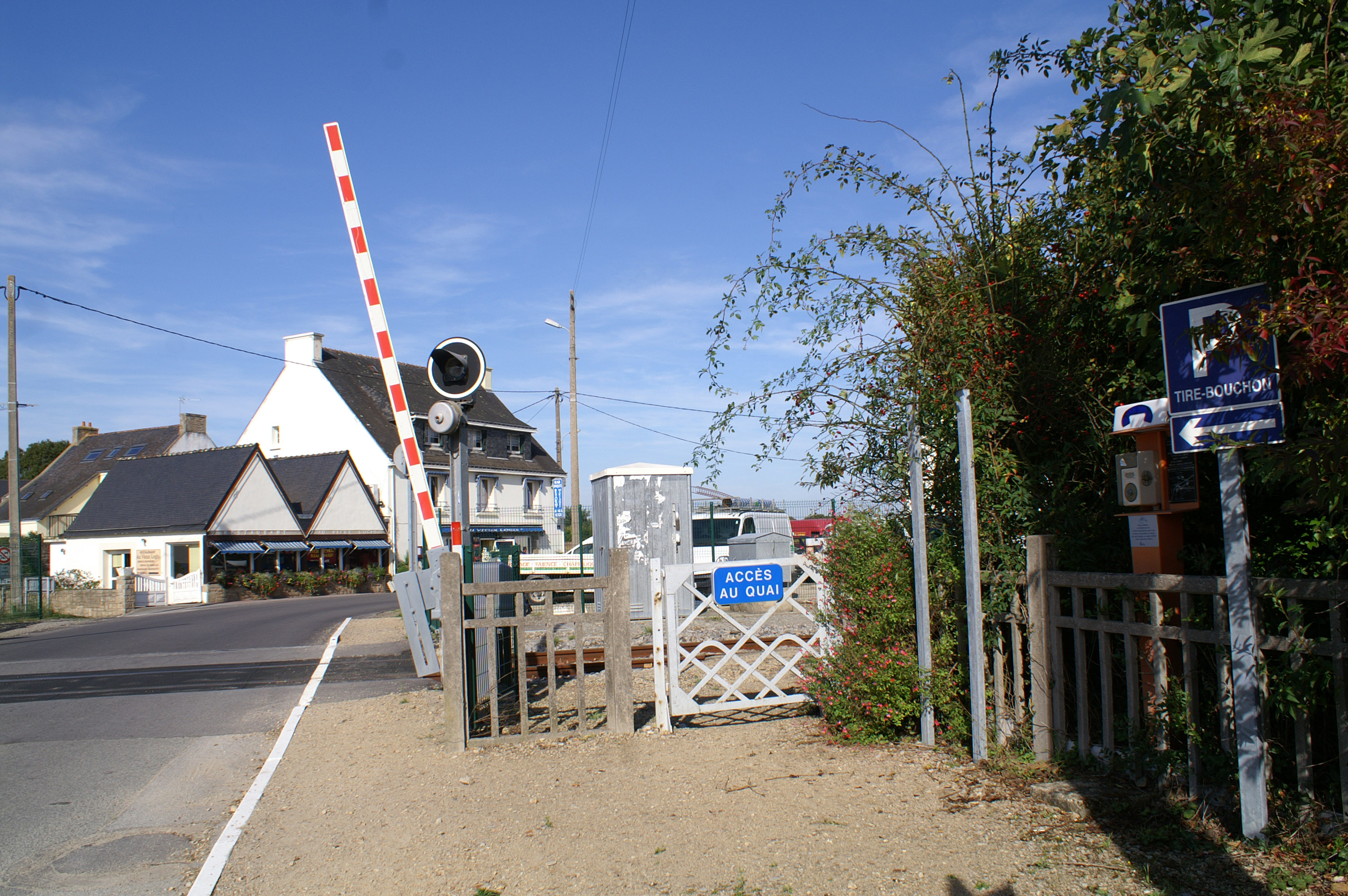
Access to the station is near the level crossing.

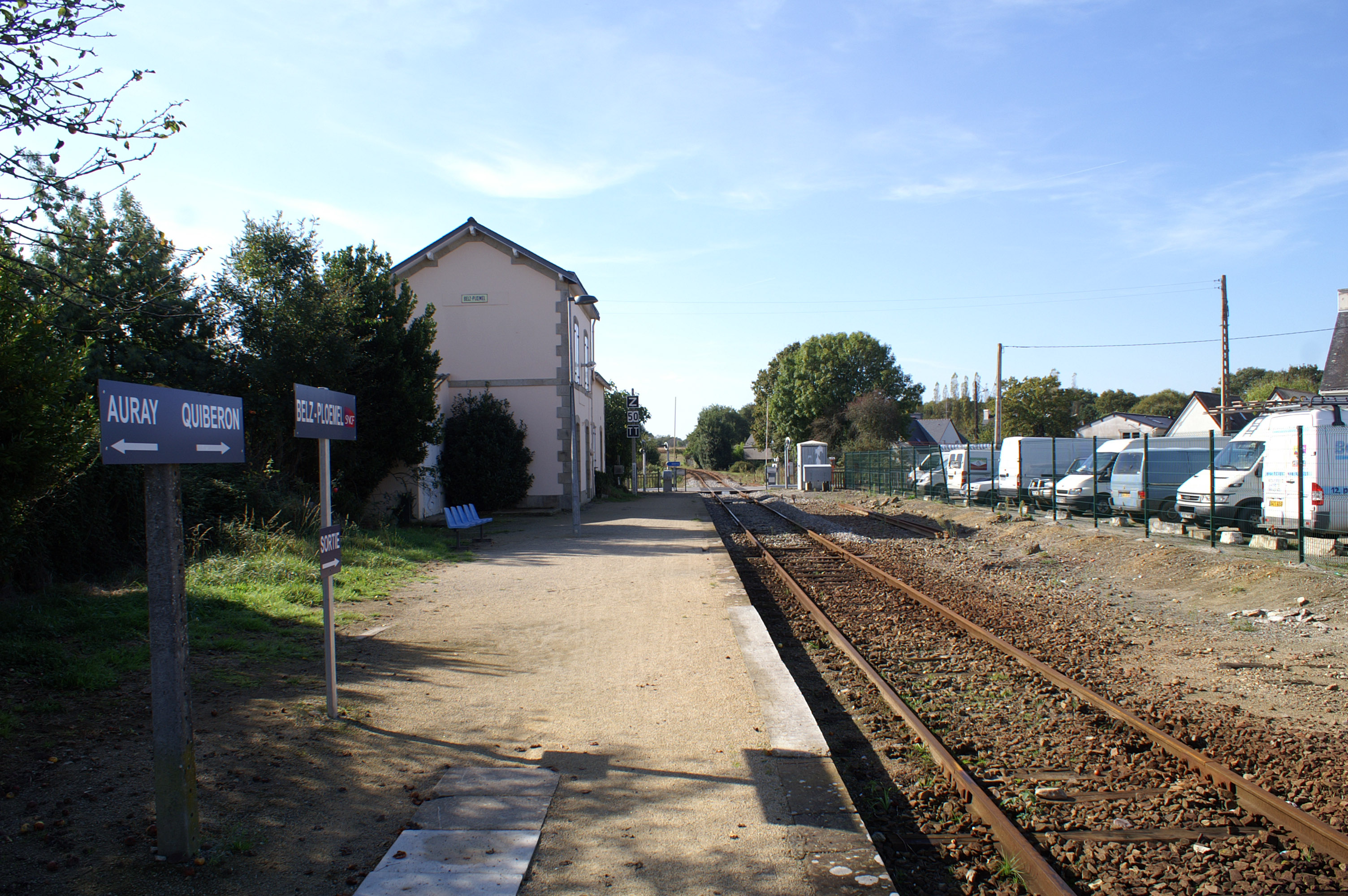
The platform, towards Quiberon.
