= Saint-Pierre-Quiberon =

Saint-Pierre-Quiberon Sant-Pêr-Kiberen
- Commune
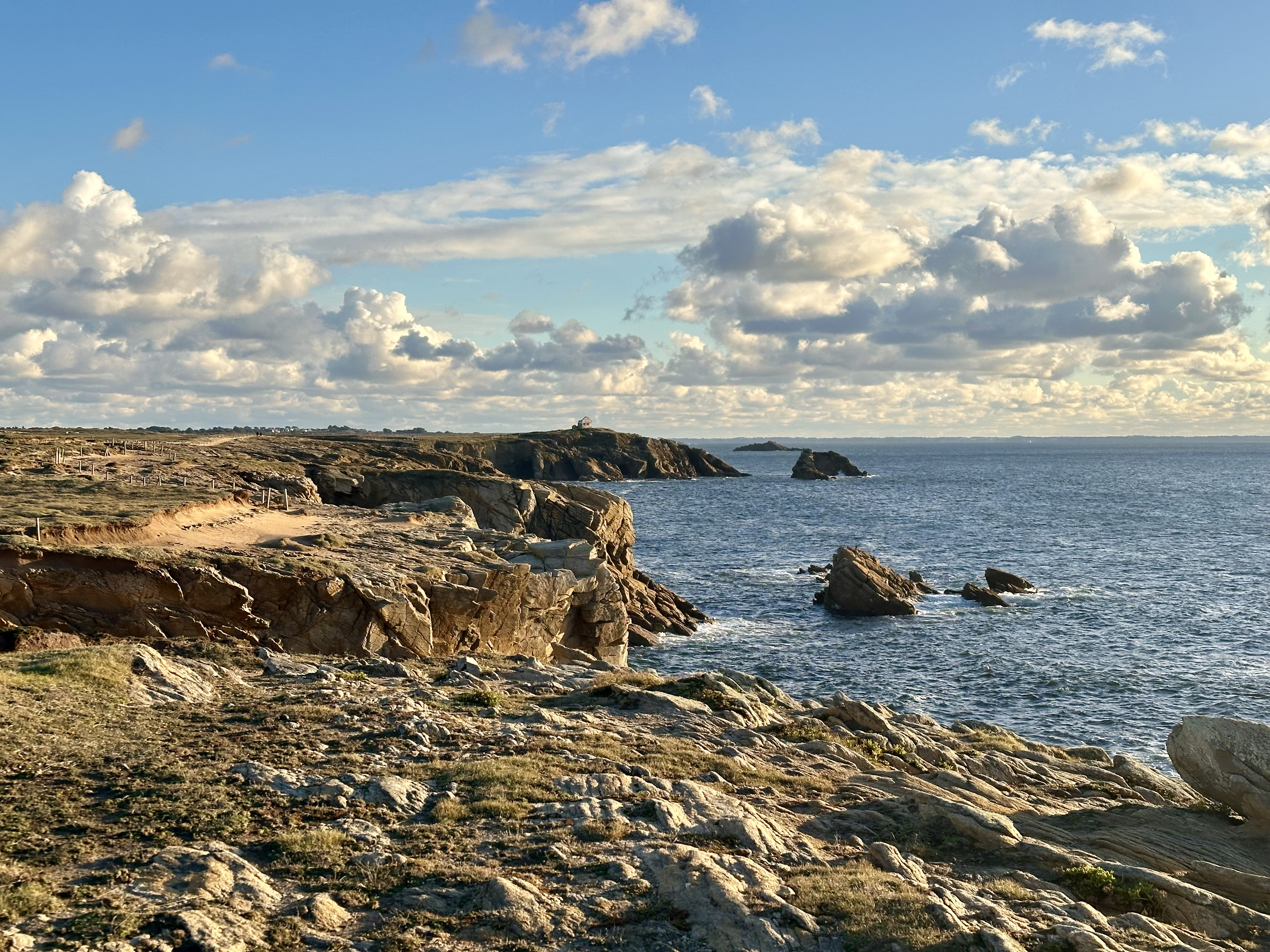
- View of Pointe Du Percho

- Coat of arms
- Location of Saint-Pierre-Quiberon
- Location within France Location within Brittany
- Coordinates: 47°31′11″N 3°07′51″W
- Country: France
- Region: Brittany
- Department: Morbihan
- Arrondissement: Lorient
- Canton: Quiberon

Government
  - Mayor (2026–32): Stéphanie Doyen
- Area^{1}: 7.54 km^{2} (2.91 sq mi)
- Highest elevation: 26 m (85 ft)
- Lowest elevation: 0 m (0 ft)
- Population (2023): 2,344
  - Density: 311/km^{2} (805/sq mi)
- Time zone: UTC+01:00 (CET)
  - Summer (DST): UTC+02:00 (CEST)
- INSEE/Postal code: 56234 /56510
- ^{1} French Land Register data, which excludes lakes, ponds, glaciers > 1 km^{2} (0.386 sq mi or 247 acres) and river estuaries.

Saint-Pierre-Quiberon (French pronunciation: [sɛ̃ pjɛʁ kibʁɔ̃]; Breton: Sant-Pêr-Kiberen) is a commune in the Morbihan department of Brittany in north-western France. The commune occupies the northern part of the Quiberon peninsula, that it shares with the commune of Quiberon.

== Population ==
Historical population
Year	Pop.	±% p.a.
1968	2,012	—
1975	1,984	−0.20%
1982	2,026	+0.30%
1990	2,184	+0.94%
1999	2,165	−0.10%
2007	2,217	+0.30%
2012	2,116	−0.93%
2017	2,060	−0.53%
2023	2,344	+2.18%
Source: INSEE

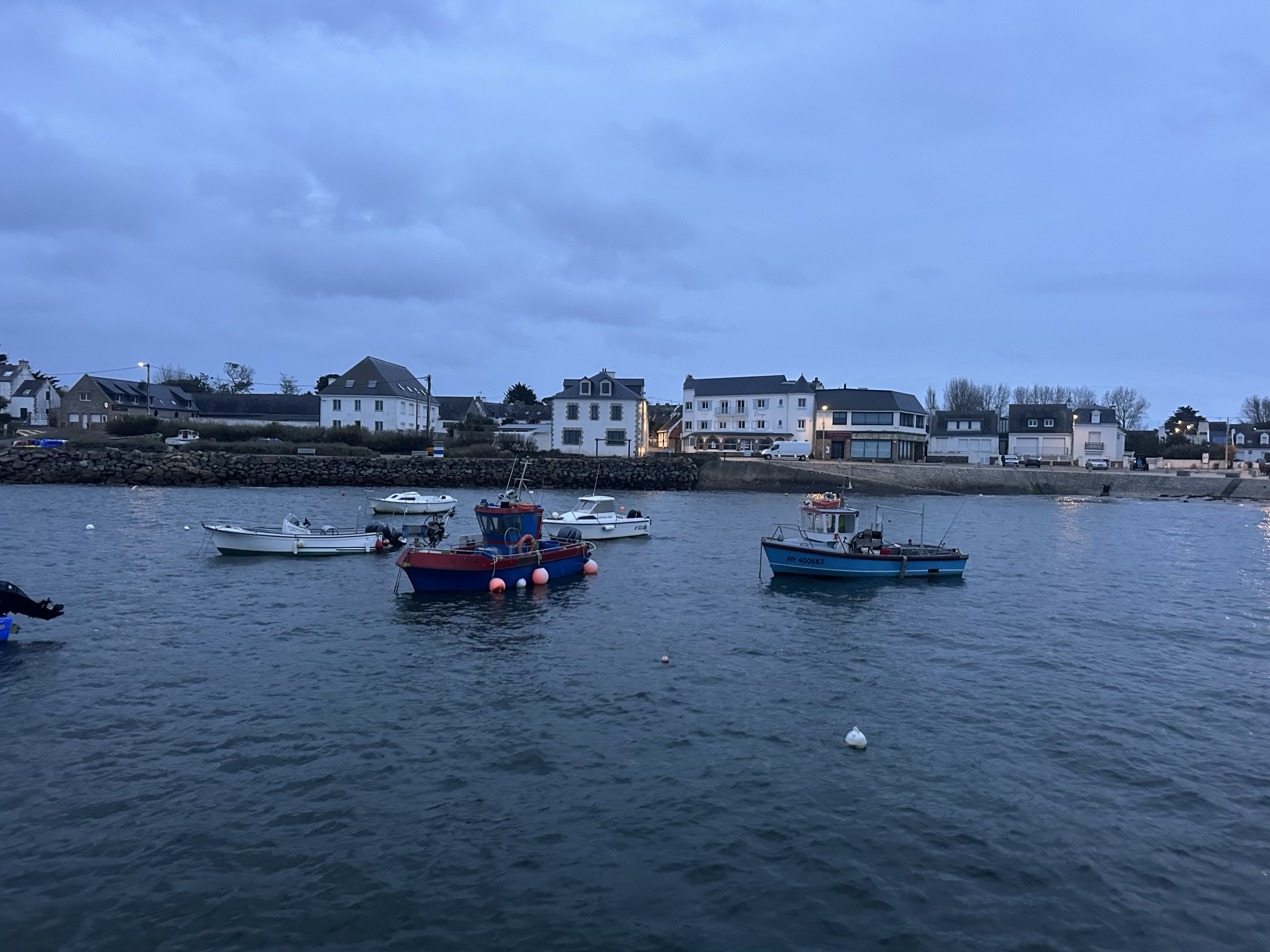
The village of Portivy

Residents of Saint-Pierre-Quiberon are called Saint-Pierrois in French.

== Politics and administration ==
List of mayors of Saint-Pierre-Quiberon
Mayor	Took office	Left office	Party	Notes
Joseph Guillevin	1856	July 1868		
Joseph Marie Amédée Le Toullec	July 1868	May 1871		
Célestin Marie Le Gloahec	May 1871	March 1925		
Bernard-André Kolb	March 1925	August 1929		
Jean Rue	August 1929	October 1936		
Pierre Josse	October 1936	June 1945		
Olivier Pillet	June 1945	May 1953		
Louis Corairie	May 1953	March 1965		
André Richard	March 1965	March 1971		
Jean-Gwenaël Le Porz	March 1971	March 1977		
Henri Tilly	March 1977	February 1980 (resigned)		
Jean-Michel Kervadec	February 1980	March 2001	UDF	
Geneviève Marchand	March 2001	March 2014	PS	
Laurence Le Duvéhat	March 2014	2020	DVD then LREM	
Stéphanie Doyen	2020	Incumbent		

== Monuments ==
Fort Penthièvre dates from the 19th century.

== Transport ==
There are four railway stations in the commune of Saint-Pierre-Quiberon, all on the Auray–Quiberon railway which is operated in summer only: Saint-Pierre-Quiberon, Kerhostin, L'Isthme and Penthièvre. At Auray station connections to Paris and other places in France are offered.

== Films ==
The 2019 French film Portrait of a Lady on Fire was filmed in part in Saint-Pierre-Quiberon.

== See also ==
- Communes of the Morbihan department
