= Plouharnel =

Plouharnel Plouharnel
- Commune
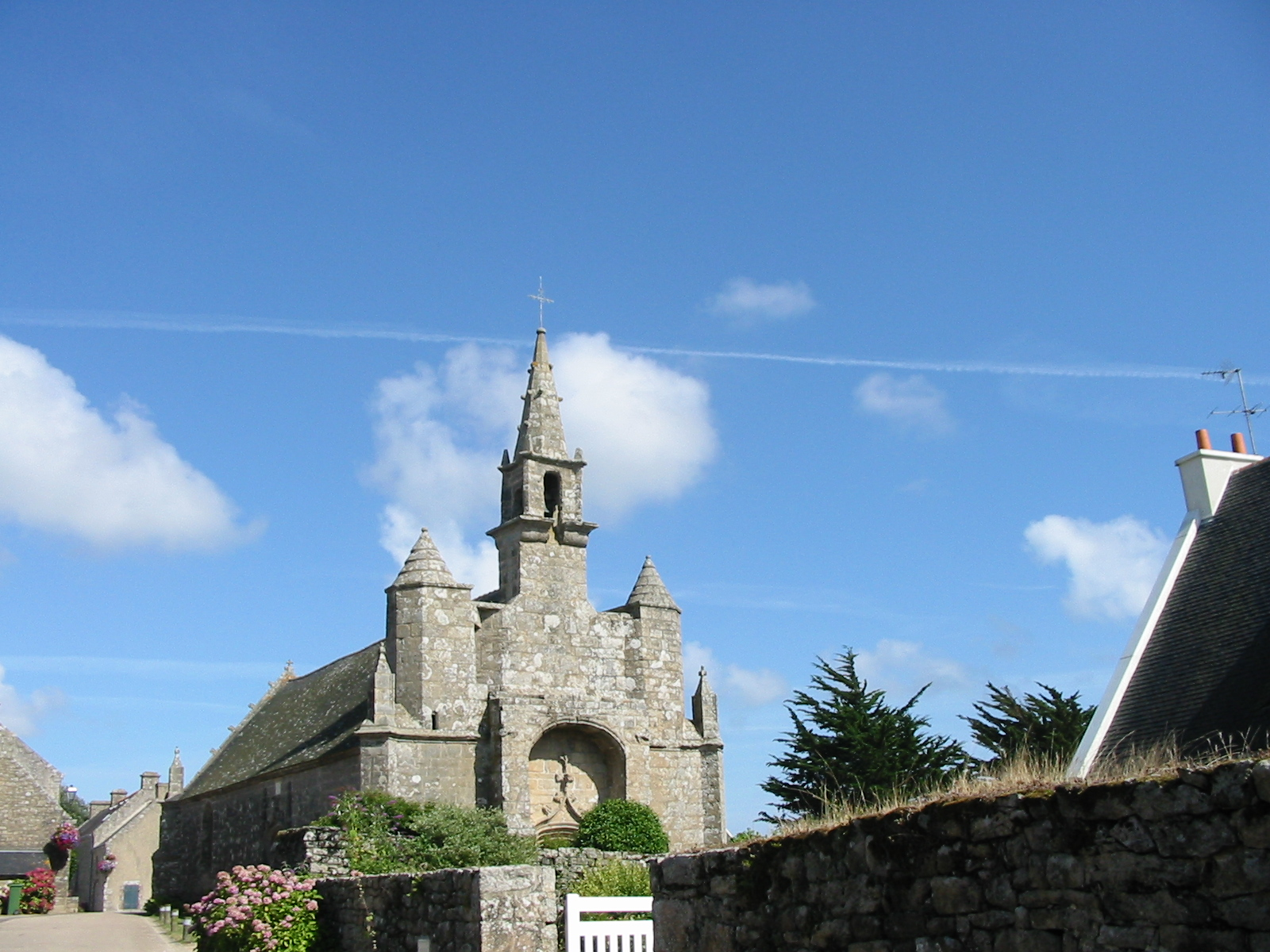
- The Chapel of Our Lady of Flowers, in Plouharnel
- Location of Plouharnel
- Location within France Location within Brittany
- Coordinates: 47°35′56″N 3°06′41″W
- Country: France
- Region: Brittany
- Department: Morbihan
- Arrondissement: Lorient
- Canton: Quiberon
- Intercommunality: Auray Quiberon Terre Atlantique

Government
  - Mayor (2026–32): Erwan Delsaut
- Area^{1}: 18.32 km^{2} (7.07 sq mi)
- Highest elevation: 33 m (108 ft)
- Lowest elevation: 0 m (0 ft)
- Population (2023): 2,285
  - Density: 124.7/km^{2} (323.0/sq mi)
- Time zone: UTC+01:00 (CET)
  - Summer (DST): UTC+02:00 (CEST)
- INSEE/Postal code: 56168 /56340
- ^{1} French Land Register data, which excludes lakes, ponds, glaciers > 1 km^{2} (0.386 sq mi or 247 acres) and river estuaries.

Plouharnel (French pronunciation: [plu.aʁnɛl]; Breton: Plouharnel) is a commune in the Morbihan department of Brittany in north-western France.

== Geography ==
Plouharnel is a seaside town located in the south of Morbihan, 12 km (7.5 mi) southwest of Auray, 25 km (16 mi) southeast of Lorient and 27 km (17 mi) west of Vannes. The commune is bordered by Atlantic Ocean except to the north and the east. The northern part of the isthmus connecting the mainland to the ancient island of Quiberon is located in the commune's southern part.

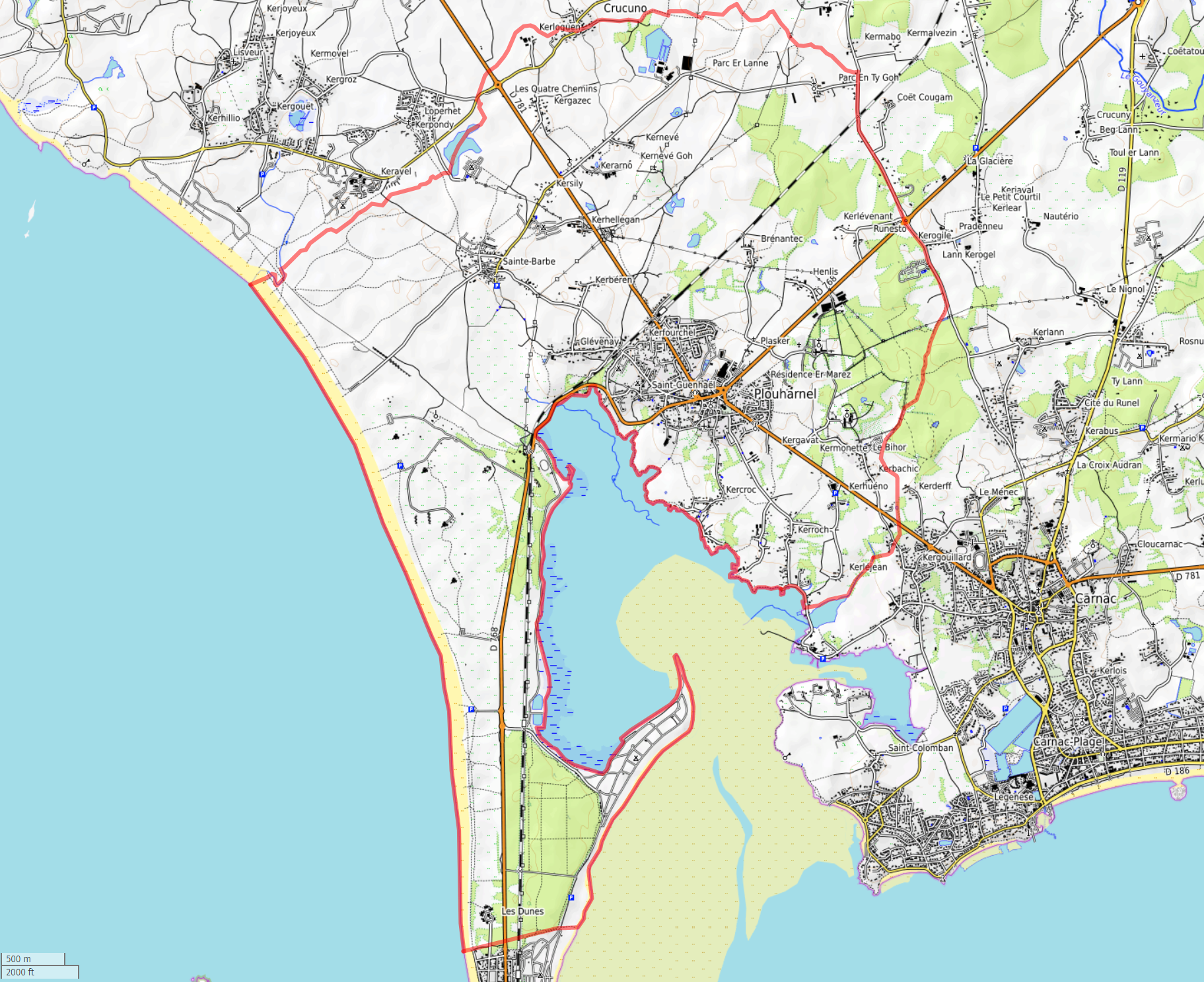
Topographic map.

== Transports ==
There are two railway stations in the commune of Plouharnel, both on the Auray–Quiberon railway which is operated in summer only: Plouharnel-Carnac and Les Sables-Blancs. At Auray station connections to Paris and other places in France are offered.

== Population ==
Historical population
Year	Pop.	±% p.a.
1968	1,487	—
1975	1,492	+0.05%
1982	1,525	+0.31%
1990	1,653	+1.01%
1999	1,700	+0.31%
2007	1,923	+1.55%
2012	2,126	+2.03%
2017	2,160	+0.32%
2023	2,285	+0.94%
Source: INSEE

Inhabitants of Plouharnel are called in French Plouharnelais.

== Monuments ==
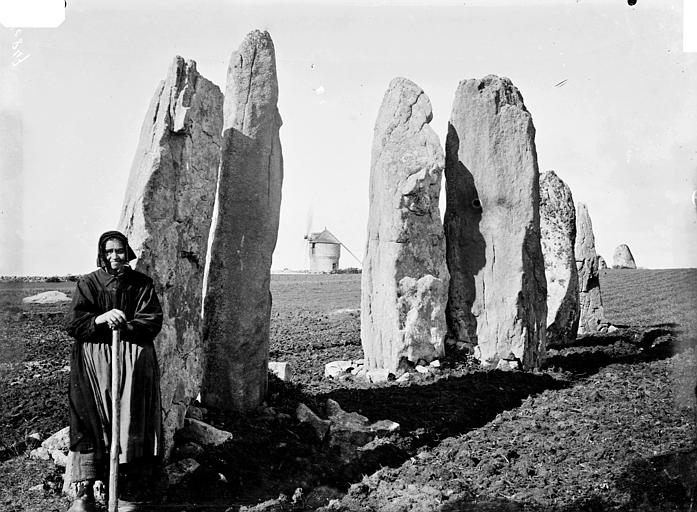
The Vieux Moulin stones. Photograph by Zacharie Le Rouzic (1864–1939)

The commune contains a number of megalithic monuments including those at Le Vieux-Moulin, comprising six stones weighing up to ten tons.

== See also ==
- Communes of the Morbihan department
