= Saint Armel =

Welsh-Breton saint, possible historical basis for King Arthur

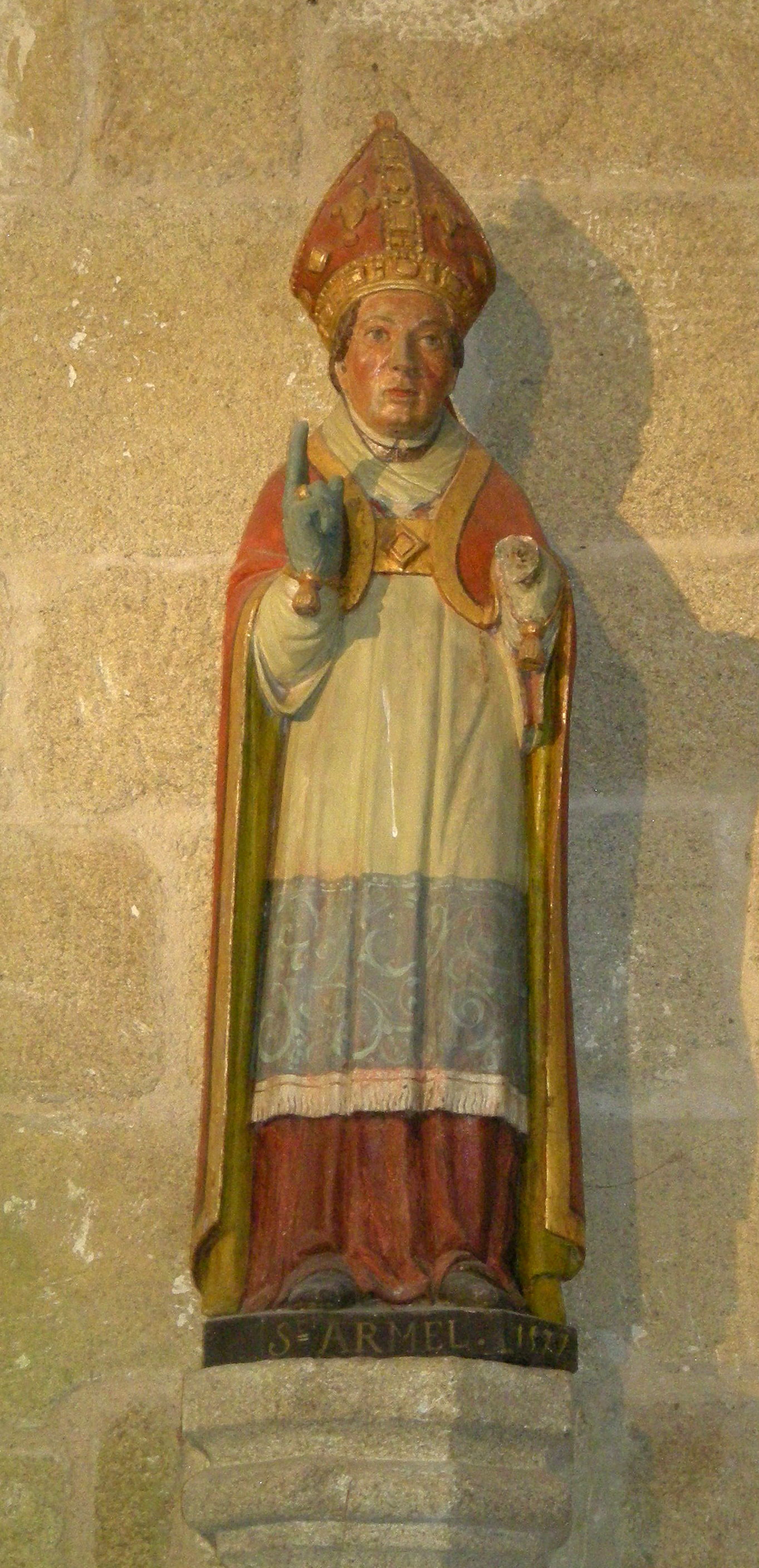
- Statue of Saint Armel at Chapelle Notre-Dame-des-Fleurs in Plouharnel

Bishop
- Born: Late 5th century Glamorgan, Wales
- Died: c. 570; Saint-Armel-des-Bochaux, Brittany, France
- Venerated in: Roman Catholic Church; Anglican Communion; Eastern Orthodox Church
- Feast: 16 August

Armel (Welsh: Arthfael, lit. "Wolf-Prince"; Latin: Armagilus) was an early 6th-century holy man in Brittany.

Armel is said to have been a Breton prince, born to the wife of King Hoel while they were living in Glamorgan in Wales in the late 5th century. He founded the abbey of Plouarzel in Brittany and was, from there, called to attend the court of King Childebert I of Paris. On the journey, he established churches at Ergué-Armel, Plouharnel and Saint-Armel which remember his name. He remained seven years at the royal court, curing the lame and the blind. The king gave him land at Saint-Armel-des-Bochaux in Ille-et-Vilaine where he founded a second monastery. He then removed himself to the Forest of Teil and is said to have defeated a dragon which was terrorising the area. He died in his monastery around 570. His feast day is 16 August.
