= Ploemel =

Ploemel Pleñver
- Commune
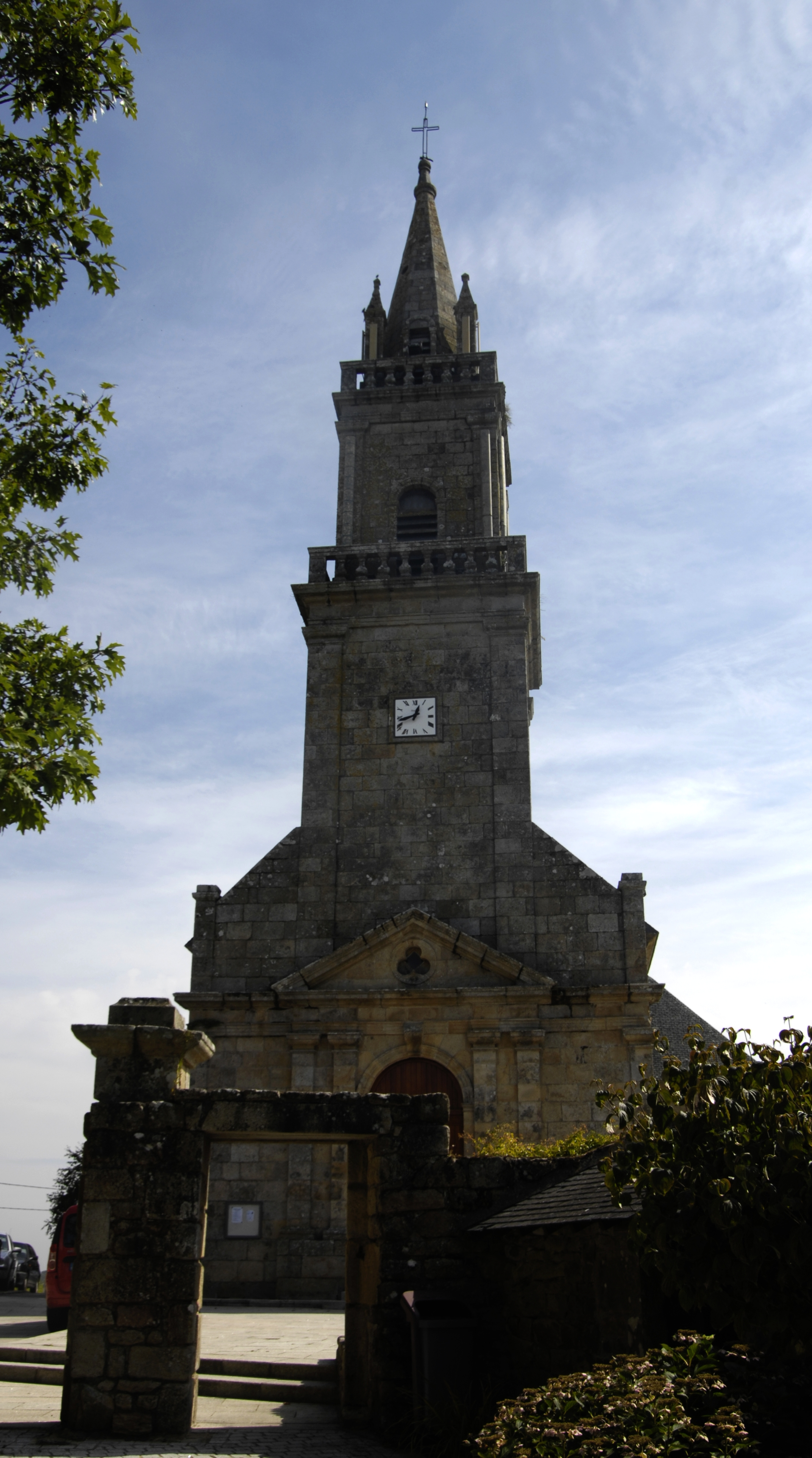
- The Church of Saint-André, in Ploemel
- Location of Ploemel
- Location within France Location within Brittany
- Coordinates: 47°39′04″N 3°04′13″W
- Country: France
- Region: Brittany
- Department: Morbihan
- Arrondissement: Lorient
- Canton: Quiberon
- Intercommunality: Auray Quiberon Terre Atlantique

Government
  - Mayor (2026–32): Stéphane Matron
- Area^{1}: 25.16 km^{2} (9.71 sq mi)
- Highest elevation: 53 m (174 ft)
- Lowest elevation: 5 m (16 ft)
- Population (2023): 3,175
  - Density: 126.2/km^{2} (326.8/sq mi)
- Time zone: UTC+01:00 (CET)
  - Summer (DST): UTC+02:00 (CEST)
- INSEE/Postal code: 56161 /56400
- ^{1} French Land Register data, which excludes lakes, ponds, glaciers > 1 km^{2} (0.386 sq mi or 247 acres) and river estuaries.

Ploemel (French pronunciation: [plɛmɛl]; Breton: Pleñver) is a commune in the Morbihan department of Brittany in north-western France.

== Population ==
Historical population
Year	Pop.	±% p.a.
1968	1,378	—
1975	1,396	+0.19%
1982	1,640	+2.33%
1990	1,892	+1.80%
1999	2,047	+0.88%
2007	2,429	+2.16%
2012	2,639	+1.67%
2017	2,888	+1.82%
2023	3,175	+1.59%
Source: INSEE

== Transportation ==
The Belz-Ploemel railway station is served by TER Bretagne trains on the Auray-Quiberon railway during the summer.

== See also ==
- Communes of the Morbihan department
