= Quiberon =

Quiberon Kiberen
- Commune
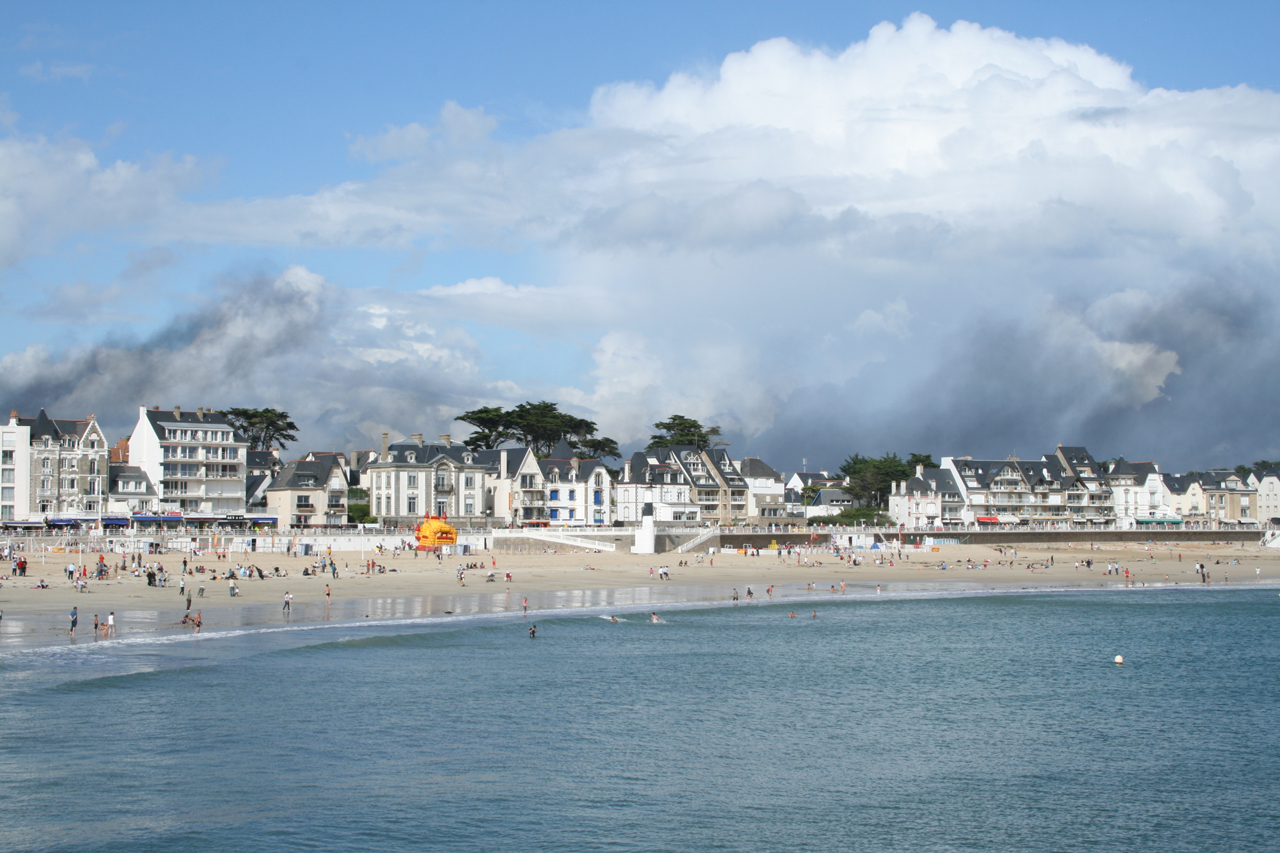
- The beach at Quiberon

- Coat of arms
- Location of Quiberon
- Location within France Location within Brittany
- Coordinates: 47°29′03″N 3°07′09″W
- Country: France
- Region: Brittany
- Department: Morbihan
- Arrondissement: Lorient
- Canton: Quiberon
- Intercommunality: Auray Quiberon Terre Atlantique

Government
  - Mayor (2026–32): Patrick Le Roux
- Area^{1}: 8.83 km^{2} (3.41 sq mi)
- Elevation: 15 m (49 ft)
- Highest elevation: 33 m (108 ft)
- Lowest elevation: 0 m (0 ft)
- Population (2023): 4,876
  - Density: 552/km^{2} (1,430/sq mi)
- Time zone: UTC+01:00 (CET)
  - Summer (DST): UTC+02:00 (CEST)
- INSEE/Postal code: 56186 /56170
- ^{1} French Land Register data, which excludes lakes, ponds, glaciers > 1 km^{2} (0.386 sq mi or 247 acres) and river estuaries.

Quiberon (French pronunciation: [kibʁɔ̃]; Breton: Kiberen, [kiˈbeːrən]) is a commune in the French department of Morbihan, administrative region of Brittany, western France.

It is on the southern part of the Quiberon peninsula, the northern part being the commune of Saint-Pierre-Quiberon. It is primarily known as a seaside resort for French tourists during summer, and for its history of sardine production.

Quiberon is connected to the mainland by a tombolo.

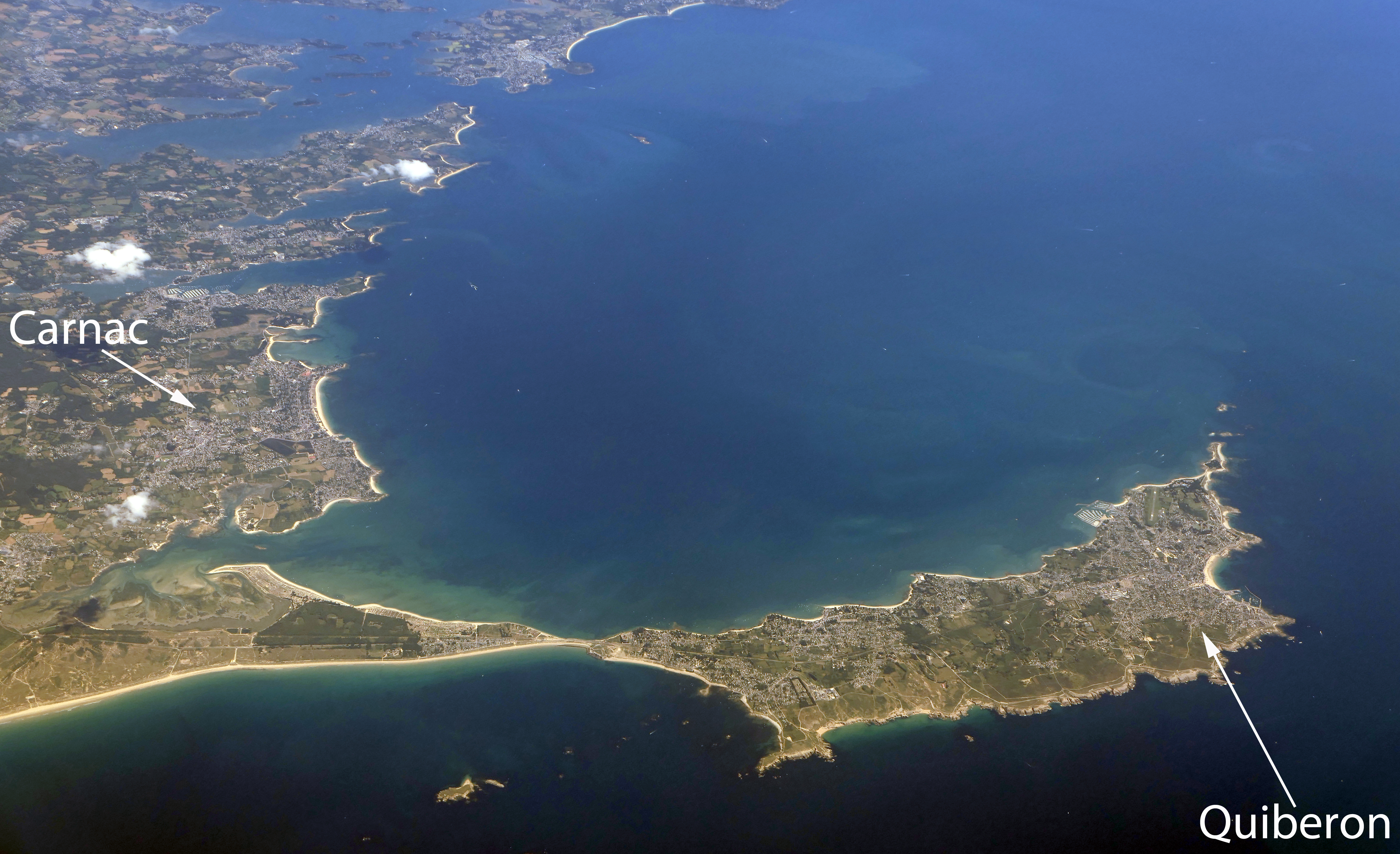
Aerial view of the Quiberon peninsula

== History ==
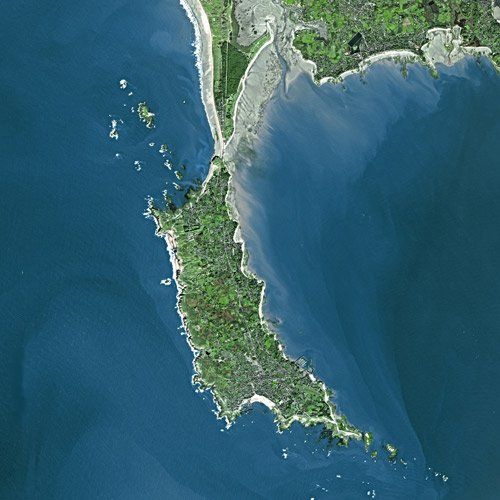
Quiberon seen from Spot Satellite

During the Seven Years' War the bay was the site of the Battle of Quiberon Bay (1759) between the French and British fleets. In July 1795, during the French Revolution, Quiberon was used by French Royalist exiles, with assistance from the British, as the base for a failed invasion of Brittany (traditionally a royalist area). The invasion was defeated by the Revolutionaries under General Lazare Hoche.

In the 19th century, Nicolas Appert, a chemist, developed a technique that permitted the sterilization of food. Thanks to this process, Quiberon became the leading harbour for sardine fishing and the production of canned sardines in France. Many families from the Finistère département migrated to Quiberon for the fishing season (May to October). When the men put out to sea, the women worked in the sardine can factories.

The railway between Auray and Quiberon was inaugurated in 1882. It deeply changed Quiberon's way of life. Fishing, canning and the exploitation of seaweed has been replaced by tourism. At that time, Quiberon became a favoured destination for the famous, including the writers Gustave Flaubert and Anatole France, and the actress Sarah Bernhardt. The year 1924 was important for the peninsula because it was classified as health resort. Now, the main resources for Quiberon come from tourism.

During the Second World War, Penthièvre Fort at the narrow isthmus was occupied by the Germans and incorporated into the Atlantic Wall. It housed various blockhouses, but was mainly used by the infantry. In July 1944, 59 resistance fighters were tortured and buried alive there. A Cross of Lorraine mounted on a stone pillar, with a plaque listing the names of the fighters, stands in their memory. Although the fort is still of military importance (as a training base), a gallery (tunnel) where the bodies were discovered can be visited.

== Monuments ==
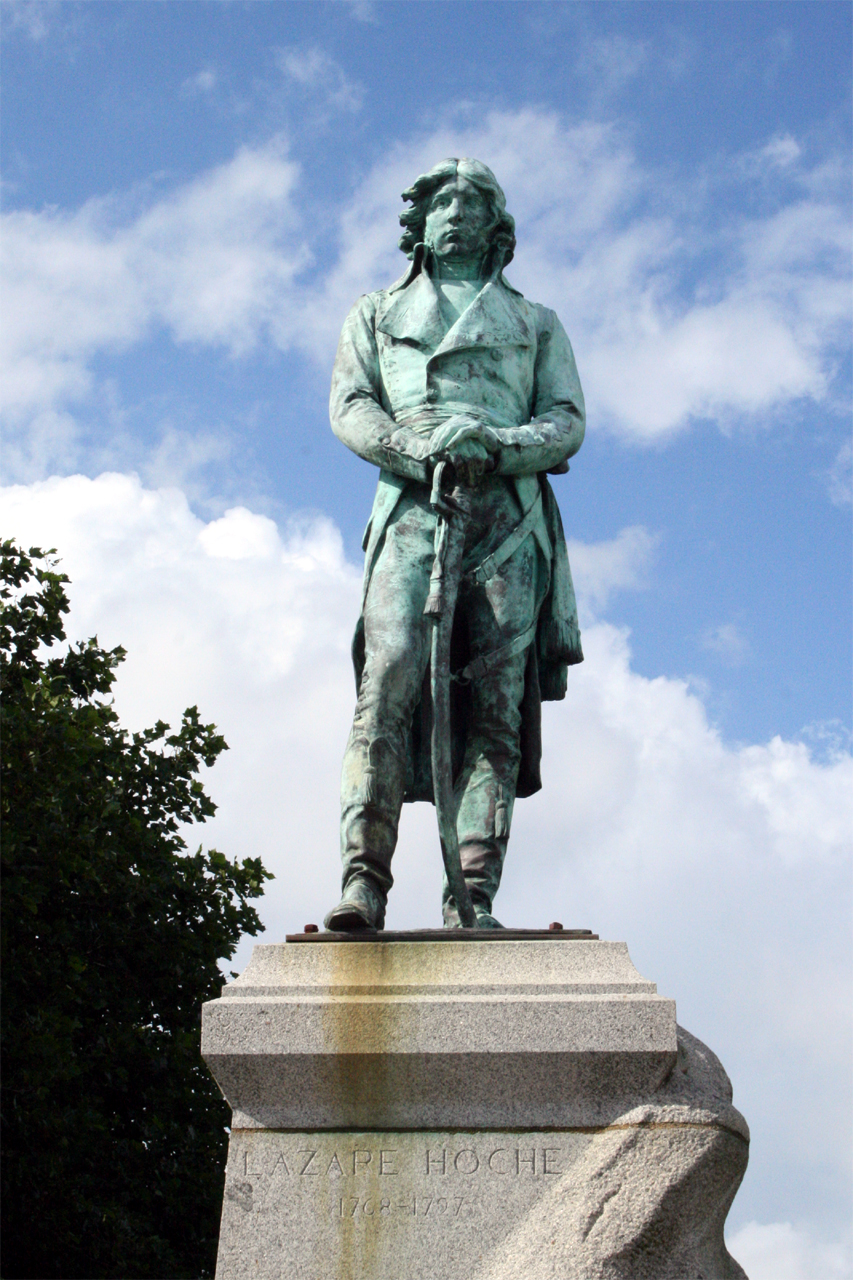
Statue of Lazare Hoche

- Église Notre-Dame de Locmaria, 19th century chapel
- Prehistoric site
- Museum of History and traditions: La maison du Patrimoine
- Musée de la mer (Museum of the sea)
- Monument to the Battle of Quiberon between the Revolutionaries and Royalists
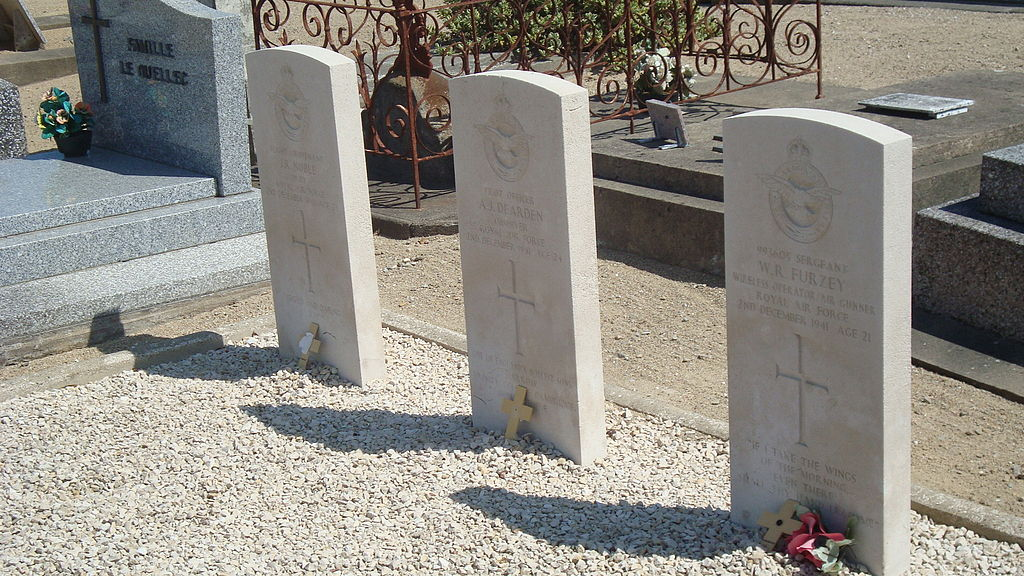

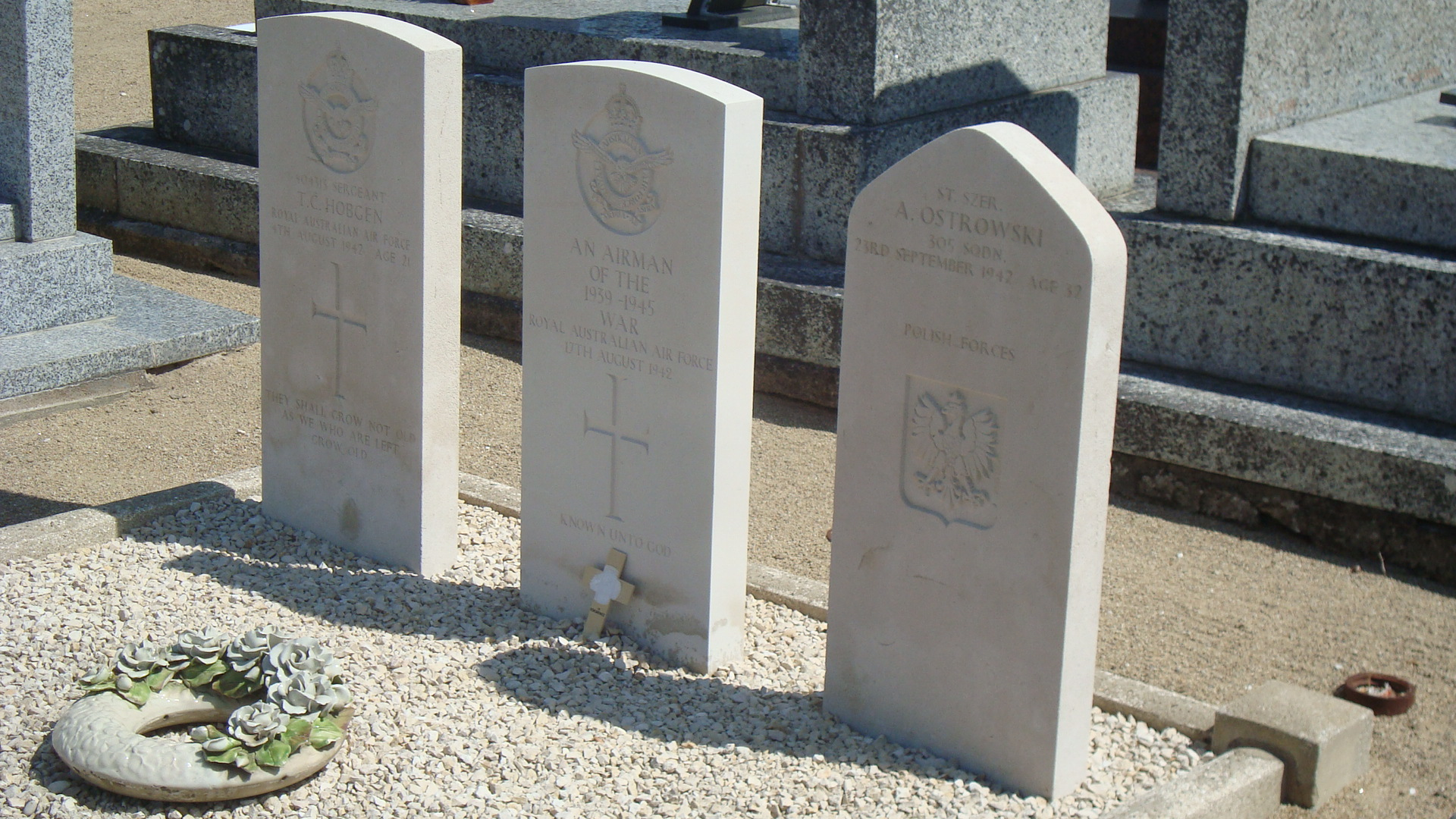
- Commonwealth war graves.

== Transport ==
Quiberon station has a summer train service to Auray, which offers connections to Paris and other places in France. From September to July a bus service operates between Quiberon and Auray.

Quiberon Aerodrome is open all year and accessible by private aircraft. The hard runway is 775m long and the tower staff speak both English and French on the radio.

== Population ==
Historical population
Year	Pop.	±% p.a.
1968	4,595	—
1975	4,723	+0.39%
1982	4,808	+0.26%
1990	4,623	−0.49%
1999	5,073	+1.04%
2007	5,052	−0.05%
2012	5,008	−0.17%
2017	4,741	−1.09%
2023	4,876	+0.47%
Source: INSEE

Inhabitants of Quiberon are called Quiberonnais.

== Twinning ==
Quiberon is twinned with:

- (United Kingdom) Looe, Cornwall, UK
- Kempten, Bavaria, Germany, since 1971 (initially with the municipality St. Mang)
- Le Grand Bornand, Haute-Savoie, France, since 1997
- Josselin, Morbihan, France

== Use in popular culture ==
3 Days in Quiberon (German: 3 Tage in Quiberon) is a 2018 drama film directed by Emily Atef and set in the town.

Quiberon is the home of a professional Quidditch team operating within the fictional Harry Potter universe. The Quiberon Quafflepunchers team members players wear shocking-pink robes.

In Oz book installment The Giant Horse of Oz (1928) by Ruth Plumly Thompson, Quiberon is the name of a sea serpent.

== Climate ==
Climate data for Quiberon (1991–2020 normals, extremes 1976–2021)
Month	Jan	Feb	Mar	Apr	May	Jun	Jul	Aug	Sep	Oct	Nov	Dec	Year
Record high °C (°F)	15.4 (59.7)	16.8 (62.2)	20.8 (69.4)	24.2 (75.6)	27.4 (81.3)	35.2 (95.4)	34.4 (93.9)	35.4 (95.7)	29.4 (84.9)	23.8 (74.8)	18.8 (65.8)	16.4 (61.5)	35.4 (95.7)
Mean daily maximum °C (°F)	9.7 (49.5)	9.9 (49.8)	12.0 (53.6)	14.3 (57.7)	17.2 (63.0)	20.0 (68.0)	21.8 (71.2)	21.9 (71.4)	20.1 (68.2)	16.4 (61.5)	13.0 (55.4)	10.5 (50.9)	15.6 (60.1)
Daily mean °C (°F)	7.8 (46.0)	7.7 (45.9)	9.4 (48.9)	11.3 (52.3)	14.1 (57.4)	16.7 (62.1)	18.5 (65.3)	18.7 (65.7)	17.0 (62.6)	14.2 (57.6)	11.0 (51.8)	8.6 (47.5)	12.9 (55.2)
Mean daily minimum °C (°F)	5.8 (42.4)	5.5 (41.9)	6.8 (44.2)	8.3 (46.9)	11.0 (51.8)	13.5 (56.3)	15.2 (59.4)	15.5 (59.9)	13.9 (57.0)	11.9 (53.4)	8.9 (48.0)	6.6 (43.9)	10.2 (50.4)
Record low °C (°F)	−9.2 (15.4)	−8.0 (17.6)	−2.6 (27.3)	−1.4 (29.5)	2.8 (37.0)	6.4 (43.5)	7.6 (45.7)	8.8 (47.8)	6.0 (42.8)	1.0 (33.8)	−2.6 (27.3)	−6.2 (20.8)	−9.2 (15.4)
Average precipitation mm (inches)	77.9 (3.07)	59.7 (2.35)	52.3 (2.06)	50.9 (2.00)	42.3 (1.67)	37.6 (1.48)	34.6 (1.36)	40.1 (1.58)	49.9 (1.96)	74.4 (2.93)	86.6 (3.41)	83.3 (3.28)	689.6 (27.15)
Average precipitation days (≥ 1.0 mm)	12.8	10.0	9.4	9.2	8.0	6.8	6.5	6.8	7.2	11.8	12.8	13.1	114.4
Source: Meteociel

== See also ==
- Communes of the Morbihan department
- Battle of Quiberon Bay (1759)
- Battle of Quiberon otherwise known as the Invasion of France (1795)
