= Quiberon station =

Railway station in Quiberon, France

Quiberon Kiberen
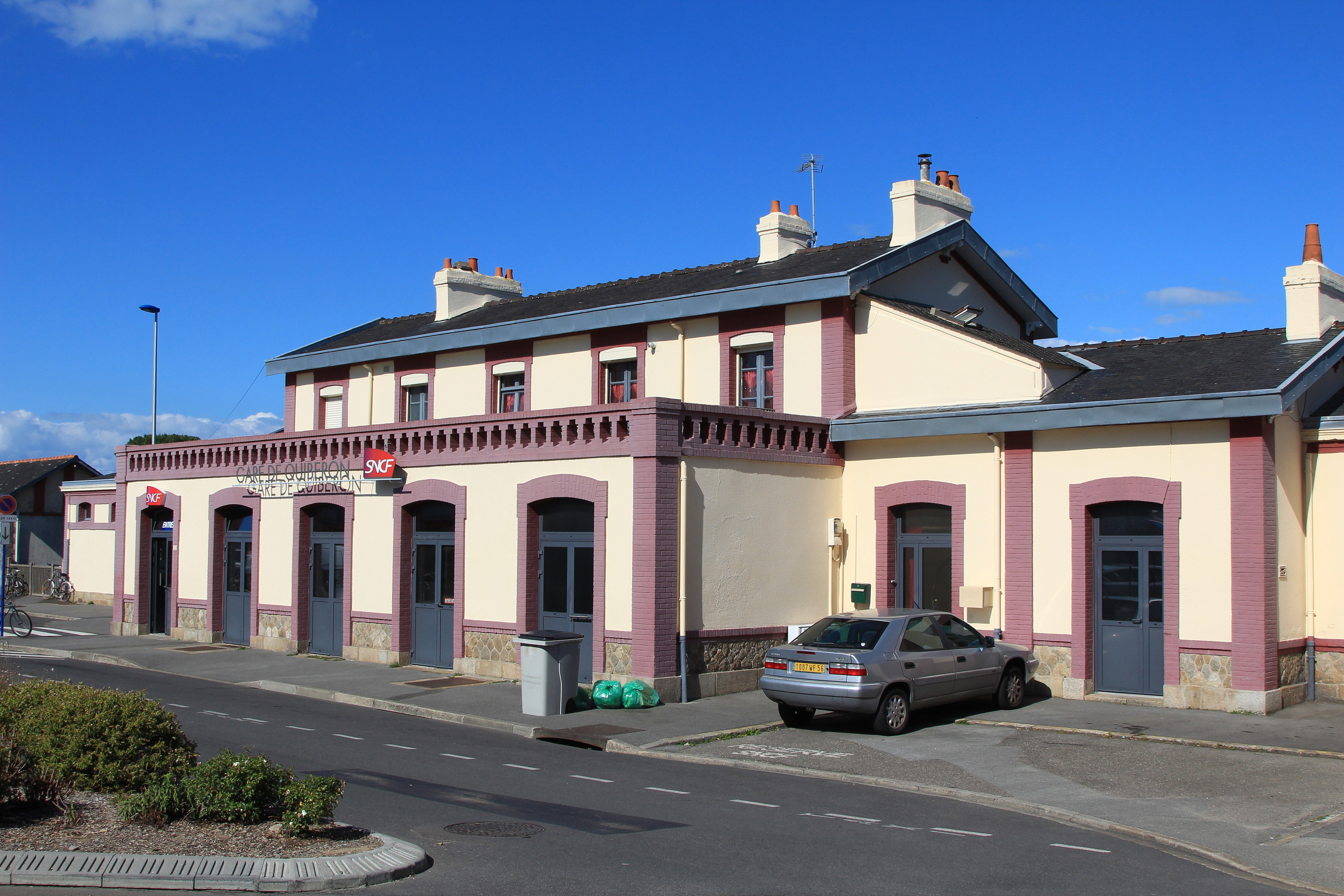

General information
- Location: Place de la Gare; 56170 Quiberon; Morbihan; France
- Coordinates: 47°29′06″N 3°07′05″W
- Elevation: 14 m (46 ft)
- Owner: SNCF
- Operator: SNCF
- Line: Auray–Quiberon railway
- Platforms: 2
- Tracks: 2

Other information
- Station code: 87476457

History
- Opened: 24 July 1882

Passengers
- 2018: 101 288

Services
Preceding station	TER Bretagne	Following station
Saint-Pierre-Quiberon towards Auray	32 Seasonal service	Terminus
Location

Quiberon (French: Gare de Quiberon; Breton: Ti-gar Kiberen) is a railway station in Quiberon, Brittany, France. The station was opened on 24 July 1882, and is located at kilometric point (KP) 612,142 on the Auray–Quiberon railway. The station is served seasonally during summer months only by TER Bretagne services operated by the SNCF, to and from Auray.

== History ==
In 2018, the SNCF estimated that the station served 101 288 passengers during the year.

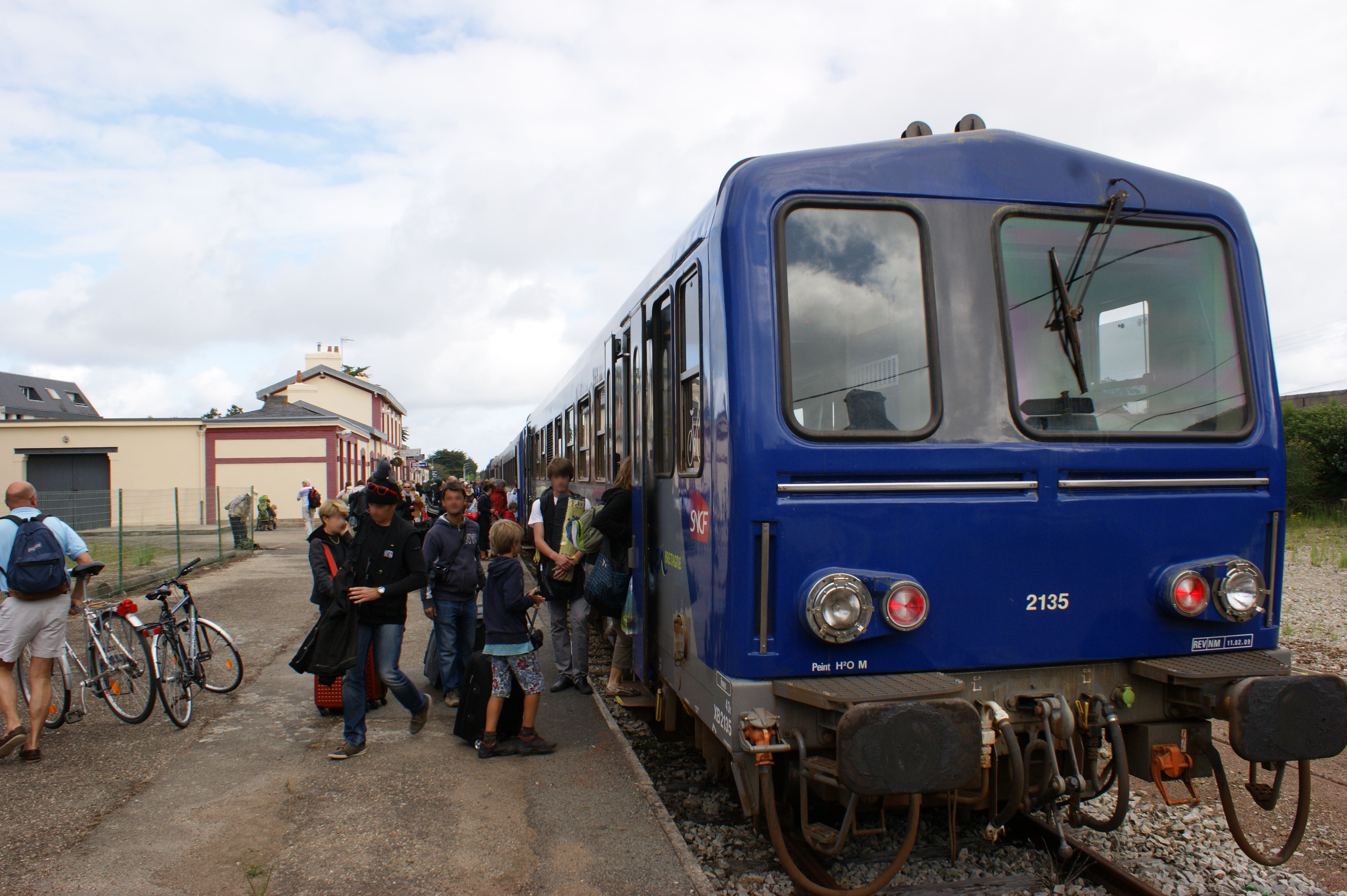
Train at the station in 2011
