= Auray station =

Railway station in Auray, France

Auray An Alre
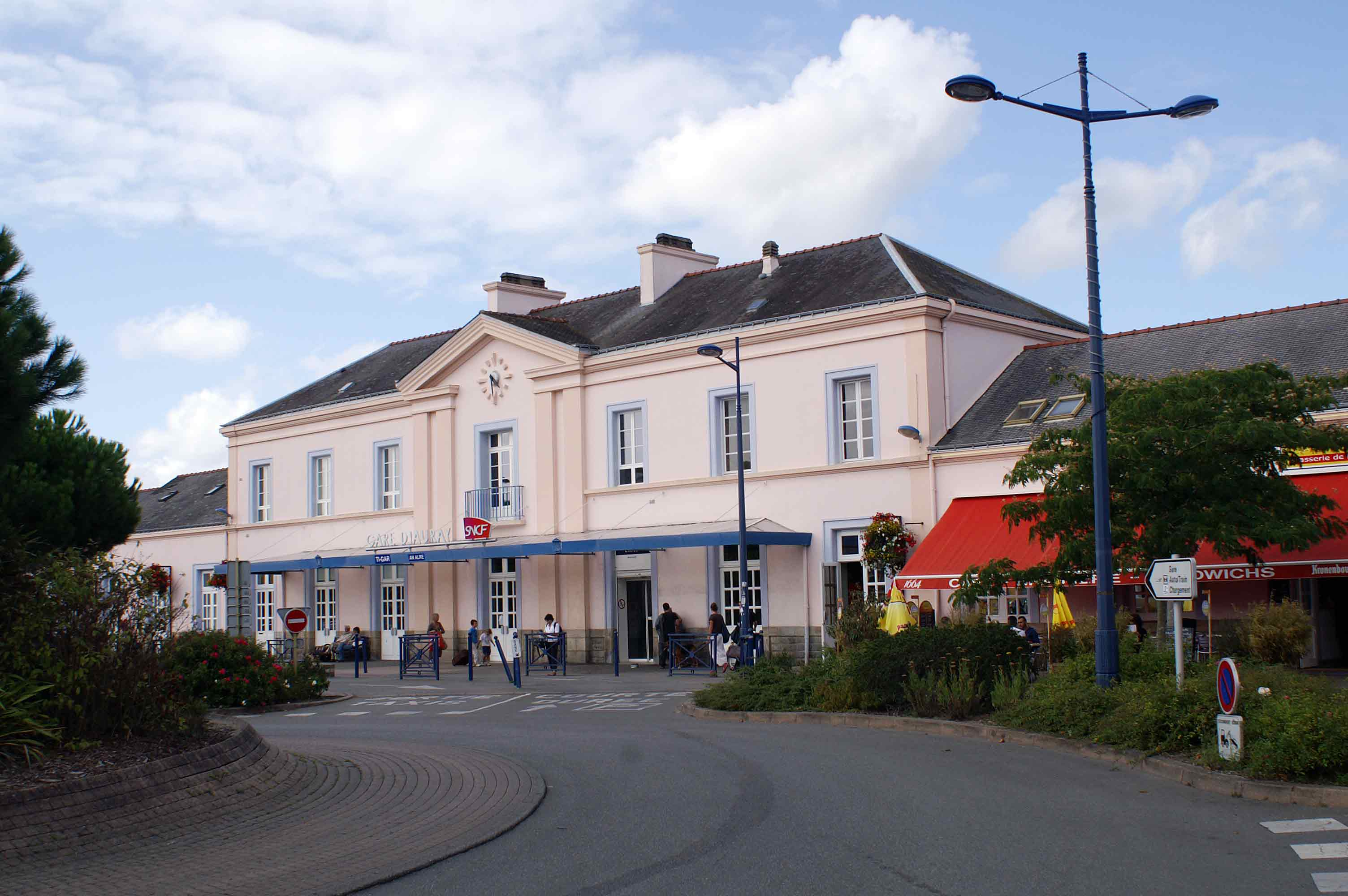
- Auray railway station

General information
- Location: Auray, Morbihan, Brittany, France
- Coordinates: 47°40′48″N 2°59′57″W
- Lines: Savenay–Landerneau railway Auray–Quiberon railway Auray–Pontivy railway
- Distance: 584.946 km
- Platforms: 2
- Tracks: 4

Other information
- Station code: 87476200

History
- Opened: 21 September 1862

Passengers
- 2024: 1,317,309
Location

Auray (French: Gare d'Auray; Breton: Ti-gar An Alre) is a railway station in Auray, Brittany, France. The station was opened on 21 September 1862 is located at kilometric point (KP) 584.946 on the Savenay–Landerneau railway. The station is also the starting point for the Auray–Quiberon railway and Auray–Pontivy railway. The station was built by the operator of the Paris - Orleans railway line. Today, the station is served by TGV (high speed), Intercités (long distance) and TER (local) services operated by the SNCF. The line to Pontivy was opened in December 1864, and the line to Quiberon was opened in July 1882. The Auray - Pontivy railway line closed to passenger traffic in October 1949, and is now only used to transport freight. The station is 2 km north-west of the centre of Auray.

== Train services ==
The station is served by high speed trains to Quimper and Paris, and regional trains to Quimper, Vannes, Nantes and Rennes. In summer there is a train service to Quiberon.

Preceding station	SNCF	Following station
Lorient towards Quimper	TGV inOui	Vannes towards Montparnasse
Lorient towards Quimper	TGV inOui Seasonal service	Vannes towards Lille-Flandres or Lille-Europe
Preceding station	TER Bretagne	Following station
Hennebont towards Quimper	2	Vannes towards Rennes
Hennebont towards Quimper	3	Vannes towards Nantes
Landaul-Mendon towards Quimper	19	Sainte-Anne towards Vannes
Terminus	32 Seasonal service	Belz-Ploemel towards Quiberon
