= Auray–Quiberon railway =

Railway line in Brittany, France

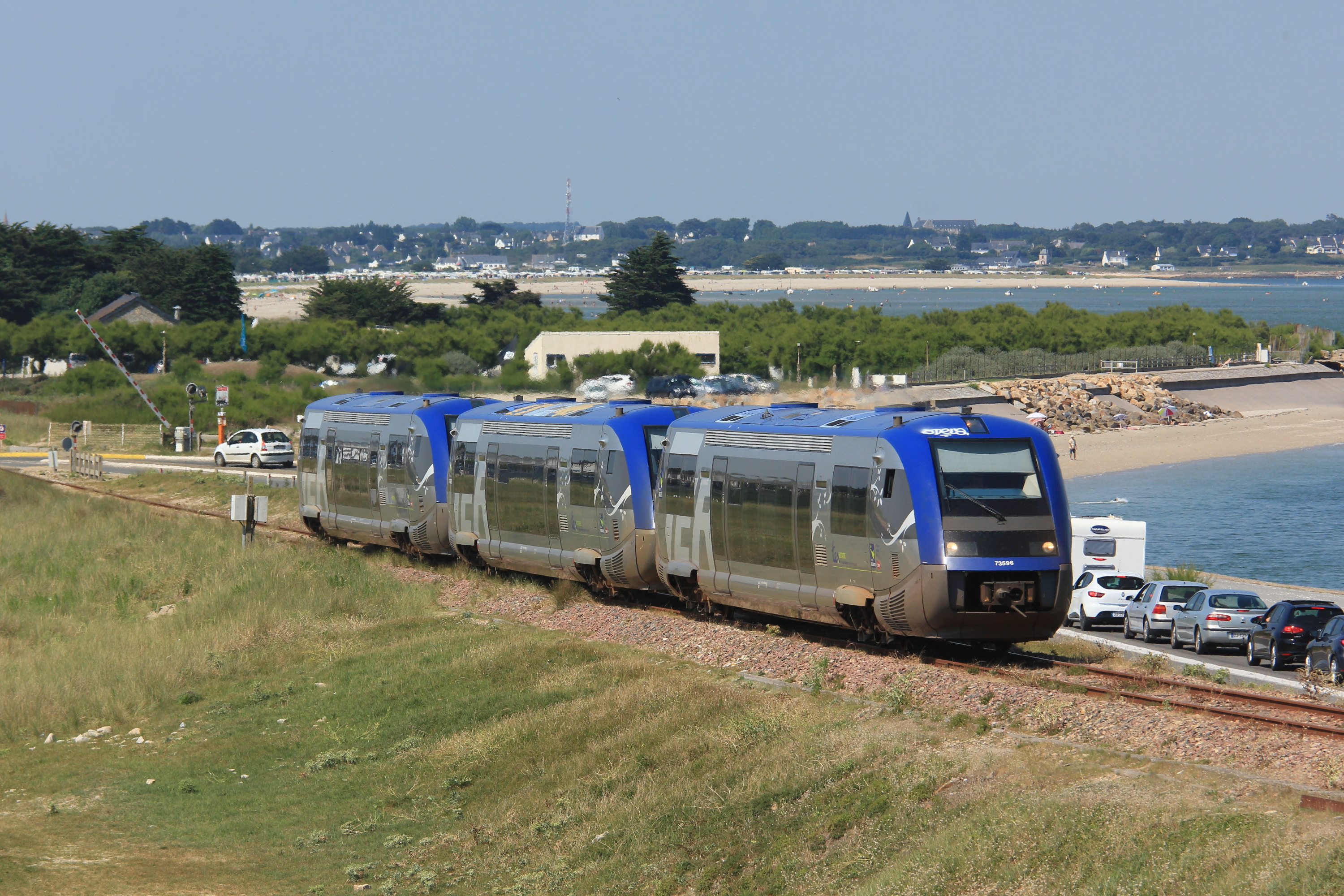
- A triple-unit ATER DMU set crossing the Penthièvre isthmus

Overview
- Native name: ligne d'Auray à Quiberon
- Owner: SNCF
- Locale: Brittany, France
- Termini: Auray; Quiberon
- Stations: 9

Service
- Operator(s): 1879–1884: state 1884–1935: PO; 1935–1937: State; 1938–1997: SNCF; 1997–2014: RFF since 2015: SNCF

History
- Commenced: 15 June 1879
- Opened: 24 July 1882
- Closed: 6 March 1972
- Reopened: 1 July 1985

Technical
- Line length: 27 km (17 mi)
- Number of tracks: single
- Track gauge: 1,435 mm (4 ft 8 1/2 in) standard gauge
- Electrification: not electrified
- Operating speed: 60 km/h (37 mph)

The Auray–Quiberon line is a single-track, standard gauge French rail line that serves the Quiberon peninsula. It branches off at Auray from the Savenay–Landerneau line, a radial line south of Brittany. A draft plan was presented on 15 July 1879, and the Chemins de fer de l'État (State Railways Administration) began construction. Operations commenced on 14 July 1882, and the line was transferred to the Compagnie du chemin de fer de Paris à Orléans (PO) the following year.

In 1972, passenger service—which had already been discontinued during the winter—was reduced to two daily trains during the summer.

To cope with the chronic congestion of the only road to reach the Quiberon peninsula from the mainland, the line was relaunched in 1985 with the introduction of single fare shuttles, jointly sponsored by the Brittany region and the SNCF as part of the TER Bretagne service. The name of this shuttle service is directly related to traffic jams that trains can avoid: "Corkscrew". This operation provides a more consistent service to the peninsula during the two months of the summer season. The rest of the year, a road bus service "TIM", organized by the department of Morbihan, links the stations of Auray and Quiberon.

== Chronology ==
- July 15, 1879: Declaration of public utility of a preliminary draft
- July 24, 1882: Commissioning of the line from Auray to Quiberon
- June 28, 1883: Transfer by the State to the Paris to Orléans Railway Company
- March 6, 1972: Closure of the line to serve omnibus passengers
- July 1, 1985: Commissioning of the “Tire-Bouchon” in July and August
