= List of writers on modern paganism =

This list of writers on modern paganism presents authors whose works address or have their basis in modern paganism.

== Religious and political writers ==
- Luis G. Abbadie (born 1968), Mexican horror and fantasy writer
- Adunis (born 1930), Syrian poet, essayist and translator; self-described "pagan mystic"
- Ra Un Nefer Amen (born 1944), American writer and Pan-African activist
- Lily Anderson (born 1988), American writer of young adult fiction
- Victor Henry Anderson (1917–2001), American poet and founding member of the Feri Tradition
- Bohdan Ihor Antonych (1909–1937), Ukrainian poet
- Amedeo Rocco Armentano (1886–1966), Italian esotericist and musician
- Alexander Asov (born 1964), Russian poet, novelist and writer on Russian pseudohistory
- Freya Aswynn (born 1949), Dutch writer
- Dawn Atkins (born 1962), American anthropologist, fiction writer and educator
- Nihal Atsız (1905–1975), Turkish nationalist writer, novelist, poet and philosopher
- Gabriel André Aucler (mid-1700s–1815), French lawyer, author of La Thréicie (1799)
- Sveinbjörn Beinteinsson (1924–1993), Icelandic poet
- Alain de Benoist (born 1943), French journalist and political philosopher
- Ernst Bergmann (1881–1945), German philosopher
- Erwan Berthou (1861–1933), French and Breton language poet, writer and neo-Druidic bard
- Gwilherm Berthou (1908–1951), French Breton nationalist and neo-Druidic bardic poet
- Manfred Böckl (1948–2026), German novelist and writer of popular history
- Gavin Bone (born 1964), English writer and lecturer
- Gary Botting (born 1943), Canadian poet, playwright, novelist and critic
- Lois Bourne (1928–2017), English Wiccan writer
- Arvīds Brastiņš (1893–1984), Latvian sculptor, writer and Dievturi leader
- Ernests Brastiņš (1892–1942), Latvian artist, amateur historian, folklorist and archaeologist
- Malcolm Brenner (born 1951), American novelist and journalist
- Phil Brucato, American writer, journalist, editor and game designer
- Raymond Buckland (1934–2017), English writer
- Pauline Campanelli (1943–2001), American artist and writer
- Philip Carr-Gomm (born 1952), British writer
- Jean Cau (1925–1993), French writer and journalist
- Aki Cederberg (born 1978), Finnish writer, musician and filmmaker
- Valdis Celms (born 1943), Latvian artist and writer
- Ipsita Roy Chakraverti (born 1950), Indian writer
- Zorian Dołęga-Chodakowski (1784–1825), Polish ethnographer and archaeologist
- D. J. Conway (1939–2019), American writer
- Vivianne Crowley, English writer
- Scott Cunningham (1956–1993), American writer
- Phyllis Curott (born 1954), American writer
- Arthur Drews (1865–1935, German writer, historian and philosopher
- Robert Dun (1920–2002), French writer
- Gerina Dunwich (born 1959), American writer
- Viktors Eglītis (1877–1945), Latvian writer and art theorist
- Eyvindur P. Eiríksson (born 1935), Icelandic poet and novelist
- Julius Evola (1898–1974), Italian writer and painter
- Cerridwen Fallingstar (born 1952), American writer
- Janet Farrar (born 1950), English writer
- Stewart Farrar (1916–2000), English screenwriter and novelist
- Guillaume Faye (1949–2019), French writer and journalist
- Pio Filippani Ronconi (1920–2010), Italian writer
- Ed Fitch (born 1937), American writer
- Stephen Flowers (born 1953), American writer
- Michael Thomas Ford (born 1968), American writer
- John Fransham (1730–1810), English writer
- Gustav Frenssen (1863–1945), German novelist
- Donald H. Frew (born 1960), American writer
- Gavin Frost (1930–2016), English writer
- Yvonne Frost (born 1931), American writer
- Christopher Gérard (born 1962), Belgian novelist, essayist, publisher and literary critic
- Marian Green (born 1944), British writer
- John Michael Greer (born 1962), American writer
- Raven Grimassi (1951–2019), American writer
- Stephan Grundy (born 1967), American writer
- Laurell K. Hamilton (born 1963), American fantasy and romance writer
- Zdzisław Harlender (1898–1939), Polish pilot, army officer and writer
- Jakob Wilhelm Hauer (1881–1962), German Indologist and writer
- Andrea Haugen (1968 or 1969–2021), German musician and writer
- Friedrich Hielscher (1902–1990), German writer
- Ellen Evert Hopman (born 1952), Austrian writer
- Sigrid Hunke (1913–1999), German writer
- Thibault Isabel (born 1978), French writer and publisher
- François Jaffrennou (1879–1956), French Breton language writer and editor
- Jón frá Pálmholti (1930–2004), Icelandic writer, journalist and social worker
- Anodea Judith (born 1952), American writer
- Wyatt Kaldenberg (born 1957), American writer
- Bjarki Karlsson (born 1965), Icelandic poet and translator
- William H. Keith Jr. (born 1950), American novelist
- Patricia Kennealy-Morrison (1946–2021), American writer and journalist
- Per Vari Kerloc'h (born 1952), French Breton language poet
- Ludwig Klages (1872–1956), German philosopher and poet
- Anthony T. Kronman (born 1945), American writer
- Jörg Lanz von Liebenfels (1874–1954), Austrian writer
- Gwenc'hlan Le Scouëzec (1929–2008), French Breton language writer
- Timothy Leary (1920–1996), American writer
- Jean Le Fustec (1855–1910), French Breton language poet
- Nicolai Levashov (1961–2012), Russian writer
- Guido von List (1848–1919), Austrian journalist, playwright and novelist
- Koenraad Logghe (born 1963), Belgian writer
- Halyna Lozko (born 1952), Ukrainian ethnologist and theologian
- Jim Lyngvild (born 1978), Danish designer and writer
- Jean-François Lyotard (1924–1998), French philosopher, sociologist and literary theorist
- Jean Mabire (1927–2006), French journalist and essayist
- Guðrún Kristín Magnúsdóttir (born 1939), Icelandic writer and artist
- Princess Marie Adelheid of Lippe (1895–1993), German writer
- Leo Martello (1930–2000), American writer
- Stephen McNallen (born 1948), American writer
- Vladimir Megre (born 1950), Russian writer
- Louis Ménard (1822–1901), French poet and writer on "mystical paganism"
- Alexander Rud Mills (1885–1964), Australian writer
- Moondog (1916–1999), American composer, musician and poet
- Alan Moore (born 1953), English writer of comic books
- Owen Morgan (1836–1921), Welsh journalist, historian and writer
- Robin Morgan (born 1941), American poet, journalist and political theorist
- Ann Moura (born 1947), American writer
- Michael Jenkins Moynihan (born 1969), American musician, writer and journalist
- Baal Müller (born 1969), German writer and publisher
- Roggero Musmeci Ferrari Bravo (1868–1937), Italian poet and playwright
- Brendan Myers (born 1974), Canadian philosopher and writer
- Árpád von Nahodyl (born 1958), also known as Géza von Neményi, German writer
- Mike Nichols (born 1952), American writer
- Ross Nichols (1902–1975), British poet
- Diana L. Paxson (born 1943), American writer
- Fernando Pessoa (1888–1935), Portuguese poet, philosopher and literary critic
- Rachel Pollack (born 1945), American novelist and comic book writer
- Silver RavenWolf (born 1956), American writer
- Vlassis Rassias (1959–2019), a Greek writer and publisher
- Hugues Rebell (1867–1905), French writer
- Arturo Reghini (1878–1946), Italian mathematician and philosopher
- Emma Restall Orr (born 1965), British writer
- Maurice Rollet (1933–2014), French poet
- Lexa Roséan (born 1958), American writer, dancer and psychoanalyst
- Richard Rudgley (born 1961), British writer
- Don Miguel Ruiz (born 1952), Mexican writer
- Saint-Loup (1908–1990), French writer, journalist and political activist
- Víctor Sánchez, (born 1961), Mexican writer
- Alfred Schuler (1865–1923), German writer
- John W. Sexton (born 1958), Irish poet, short-story writer, radio script-writer and children's novelist
- Volodymyr Shaian (1908–1974), Ukrainian linguist, philologist and Orientalist-Sanskritologist
- Philip Shallcrass (born 1953), English artist, writer and musician
- William Sharp (1855–1905), Scottish writer
- Maggie Shayne (born 1962), American novelist
- Lady Sheba (1920–2002), American writer
- Eileen Sheehan (born 1963), Irish poet
- Peryt Shou (1873–1953), German writer
- Monica Sjöö (1938–2005), Swedish painter and writer
- Robin Skelton (1925–1997), British-born Canadian poet
- Jan Stachniuk (1905–1963), Polish philosopher and publisher
- Starhawk (born 1951), American writer
- Lady Gwen Thompson (1928–1986), American writer
- Mary Oneida Toups (1928–1981), American writer
- Mellie Uyldert (1908–2009), Dutch writer
- Antonio Velasco Piña (born 1935), Mexican novelist and essayist
- Veleslav (born 1973), Russian writer
- Dominique Venner (1935–2013), French historian, journalist and essayist
- Hilda Vīka (1897–1963), Latvian poet and novelist
- Varg Vikernes (born 1973), Norwegian musician and writer
- Vydūnas (1868–1953), Lithuanian poet and philosopher
- Ernst Wachler (1871–1945), German writer
- Robert Anton Wilson (1932–2007), American novelist and essayist
- Amanda Yates Garcia, American writer and activist
- Oberon Zell-Ravenheart (born 1942), American writer
- Žiarislav (born 1967), Slovak musician and writer
- Z'EV (1951–2017), American poet and sound artist

== Scholars ==
- Margot Adler (1946–2014), American scholar
- Helen A. Berger (born 1949), American sociologist
- Chas S. Clifton (born 1951), American religious studies scholar
- Carole M. Cusack, Australian historian of religion
- Stéphane François (born 1973), French political scientist
- Mattias Gardell (born 1959), Swedish historian and scholar of comparative religion
- René Gründer (born 1975), German sociologist
- Hans Thomas Hakl (born 1947), Austrian scholar of Western esotericism
- Graham Harvey (born 1959), English religious studies scholar
- Ronald Hutton (born 1953), English historian
- Aidan A. Kelly (born 1940), American scholar and poet
- Sabina Magliocco (born 1959), American anthropologist
- Mathias Nordvig (born 1982), Danish Scandinavian studies scholar
- Sarah M. Pike, American religious studies scholar
- Leo Ruickbie, British historian and sociologist of religion
- Stefanie von Schnurbein (born 1961), German literary scholar
- Michael York, American religious studies scholar
