= List of druids and neo-druids =

An incomplete list of notable druids and neo-druids:

== Historical druids ==
- Diviciacus of the Aedui (fl. 1st century BC), the only Druid known by name from historical data. Lived in Gaul, modern-day France.

== Legendary druids ==
- Amergin Glúingel
- Bodhmall—female druid in the Fenian cycle
- Cathbad—Ulster cycle
- Gwenc'hlan—6th century Breton
- Merlin—from the Arthurian legends
- Mug Ruith—blind druid in Irish mythology
- Tadg mac Nuadat—Fenian cycle
- Tlachtga—daughter of Mug Ruith
- Bé Chuille—One of the Tuatha Dé Danann in Irish mythology featured in a tale from the Metrical Dindshenchas
- Biróg—A druidess of the Tuatha Dé Danann in Irish mythology

== Modern druids or neo-druids ==
- Erwen Berthou (Breton, 1861-1933), French and Breton language poet, writer and neo-Druidic bard
- Gwilherm Berthou (Breton, 1908-1951), Breton nationalist and neo-Druidic bardic poet
- Steve Blamires (Scotland, b. 1955), researcher and historian in the fields of neopaganism, Celtic spirituality and folklore
- Isaac Bonewits (US, 1949-2010)
- Philip Carr-Gomm (British), British druid and former Chosen Chief of OBOD
- Ossian D'Ambrosio (Italian, born 1970), musician, founder of the Cerchio Druidico Italiano
- Robert Lee "Skip" Ellison (US)
- Jean Le Fustec Breton Grand Druid from 1900 to 1903.
- John Michael Greer (US, Grand Archdruid, AODA)
- Godfrey Higgins (British, born 1772)
- Ellen Evert Hopman (US)
- Per Vari Kerloc'h Breton Grand Druid from 2008
- Paul Ladmirault (Breton)
- Nicholas R. Mann (British)
- Morvan Marchal (Breton) (1900-1963), architect, prominent member of the Breton national movement, designer of the national flag of Brittany
- Gerald Massey (English, 1828-1907)
- Iolo Morganwg (Welsh, 1747-1826), antiquarian, poet and collector
- Brendan Myers (Canadian, b. 1974), philosopher and author
- Ross Nichols (British, 1902-1975), Cambridge academic and published poet, artist and historian, founder of OBOD
- Xoán Paredes (b. 1975), geographer, teacher and Galician Arch-Druid from 2011
- William Price (Welsh, 1800-1893), Welsh doctor known for his support of Welsh nationalism and Chartism
- Emma Restall Orr (British, b. 1965), animist, poet and author
- Gwenc'hlan Le Scouëzec (1929-2008), Breton writer, Breton Grand Druid from 1981 to 2008.
- François Taldir-Jaffrennou (1879-1956), Breton Grand Druid from 1933 to 1955, Breton language writer and editor, one of the pioneers of the Breton autonomist movement.
- George Watson MacGregor-Reid (d. 1946), Scottish druid and founder of the Church of the Universal Bond

== Fictional druids ==
- Getafix, a Gaulish druid appearing in the French comic book series Asterix. His original French name is Panoramix.
- Doctor Druid, a Marvel Comics character.
- Allanon, one of the main protagonists in the Shannara series by author Terry Brooks.
- Taliesin, a powerful druid and the penultimate "Merlin" of Britain in The Mists of Avalon novel by Marion Zimmer Bradley.
- Kevin, druid, harpist and last "Merlin" of Britain, in The Mists of Avalon novel by Marion Zimmer Bradley.
- Amergin, bard in the novel Bard: The Odyssey of the Irish, by Morgan Llywelyn, and his brother Colptha, a diviner.
- Pikel Bouldershoulder, in the novels of The Cleric Quintet series by R. A. Salvatore.
- Merlin, a wizard who appears in Arthurian legend and is presented as a druid in some modern works, including The Warlord Chronicles series of books by Bernard Cornwell and the 2004 film King Arthur.
- Iseldir, Druid chieftain and temporary guardian of the Cup of Life in the TV series Merlin.
- Atticus O'Sullivan, real name Siodhachan O Suileabhain, last of the druids in The Iron Druid Chronicles series.
- Keyleth, the druid portrayed by Marisha Ray in the long-running web series Critical Role.

== See also ==
- Neopagans
- List of pagans
