= Victor Sanchez =

Victor Sanchez may refer to:

- Víctor Sánchez (writer) (born 1961), Mexican writer
- Victor Sanchez (Dominican politician) (born 1966), Dominican politician
- Víctor Sánchez (footballer, born 1976), former Spanish football midfielder
- Víctor Sánchez (footballer, born 1987), Spanish football defender/midfielder
- Víctor Sánchez (footballer, born 2002), Spanish football forward
- Victor Sanchez Union Field, Belizean football stadium
