= François Jaffrennou =

Breton poet and bard (1879–1956)

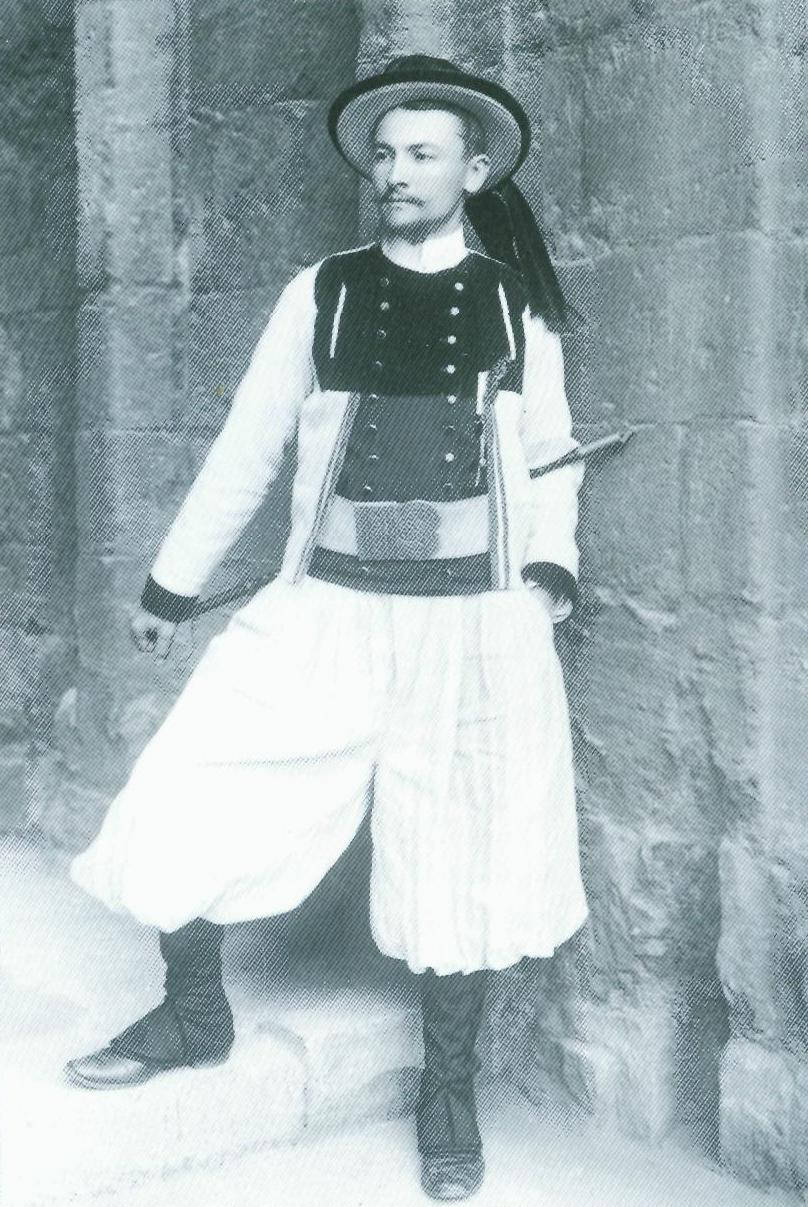
François Jaffrennou in Breton national costume at the Celtic Congress of Caernarfon, 1904

François-Joseph-Claude Jaffrennou (15 March 1879 - 23 March 1956) was a Breton language writer and editor. He was a Breton nationalist and a neo-druid bard. He is also known as François Taldir-Jaffrennou, since he also used the bardic name Taldir ("Wall of Steel"). He was one of the pioneers of the Breton autonomist movement.

== Early life ==
He was born in Carnoët, the son of a notary. His mother, Anna Ropars, was from Bolazec. He went on to study law.

In August 1898, in Morlaix the Breton Regionalist Union was founded by Régis de l'Estourbeillon under the chairmanship of Anatole le Braz. Jaffrennou became secretary of the section dedicated to Breton language and literature. Between 1898 and 1899, he worked at Morlaix for the newspaper La Resistance, publishing a page about Breton literature.

On 18 July 1899, Jaffrennou visited the Eisteddfod in Cardiff with twenty one other Bretons. He was received at Gorsedd under the name Taldir ab Hernin. At this time he translated the Welsh national anthem Land of my Fathers into Breton as Bro Gozh ma Zadoù, which became the national anthem of Brittany. This hymn is now recognized and accepted by all political and cultural groups in Brittany. It was originally published in 1898 in La Résistance.

In October 1899, he moved to Rennes. There he met the editor of L’Ouest-Éclair, then in its infancy, in which he went on to publish two columns in Breton. Some time later, he founded the Federation of Breton Students. He completed his military service in Guingamp with the Dispensés platoon.

== Breton nationalist activism ==
In 1901, with Jean Le Fustec, he created the Gorsedd of Brittany on the model of the Welsh Gorsedd. Having finished his law degree, he worked with his father to further his legal studies. He became acquainted with the printer Alexandre Le Goaziou and with him created Ar Vro (The Nation) whose first issue appeared on 1 March 1904. They then decided to unite to create a printshop in Carhaix. It published Ar vro and a bilingual newspaper Ar Bobl (The People), which appeared up to 1914. In 1913, he earned his doctorate from the University of Rennes for a thesis he wrote in Breton on the Breton language writer Prosper Proux.

He fought for France during the First World War. When he returned to Carhaix, he sold his share of the press.

He continued to be active in the Breton Regionalist Federation, and participated in the journal La Bretagne libertaire in 1923. In 1926 he created An Oaled, a quarterly newsletter promoting regionalism and bardism in French and Breton. He continued to publish this until his death in 1956. He also wrote numerous articles, plays and books, including Buhez Sant Erwan, An Hirvoudou (1899), An Delen Dir (1900), Breiziz (1911).

== Political disputes ==
Throughout the 1930s, he was in open conflict with the extremist wing of the Breton nationalists within the Breton National Party headed by Olier Mordrel and François Debeauvais. The disputes were over the issue of the Breton flag Gwenn-ha-Du, Breton orthography and, most importantly, the issue of political independence from the Third French Republic.

These topics were the subject of a long controversy and numerous articles published in his journal An Oaled in which Jaffennou set himself against the BNP, which retaliated by attacking his regionalist ideology and his links to the French political elite.

At this period he also became Grand Druid of the Gorsedd of Brittany, being appointed in 1933 and retaining the office until 1955.

== World War II ==
Jaffrennou's views before the outbreak of war were anti-German and pro-British:

- "In our opinion there are only two ways to safeguard our freedom and tranquillity: strengthen the Eastern border with impenetrable defenses and consolidate the alliance with the British"
- "Germany after having secured the complicity of Russia, thought the time come to dismember Poland once more. Great Britain and France, committed to this brave country, have mobilized their forces land, sea and air. "

In 1939, he ceased publication of An Oaled. After the Fall of France Mordrel and Debeauvais set up the pro-German nationalist journal l'Heure Bretonne. On 29 September 1940, l'Heure Bretonne published an article under the title: Taldir veut écarteler la Bretagne (Taldir wants to dismember Brittany), which attacked plans to create the truncated Region of Brittany:

Taldir-Jaffrennou just submitted a report which is a real killer of Brittany. This report contains as its main feature the cutting of Brittany into three parts: The Ille-et-Vilaine is attached to the English Channel to form an economic region. The Loire-Inférieure is part of the Vendee for the same reason. The three departments, Finistere, Cotes-du-Nord and Morbihan, are intended to form a "cultural whole." Pierre Laval has found this "very intelligent". Well, we will not work with this; we will not let them fleece Brittany. Stop! Brittany is one nation with five departments. It is under this unit that its fate should be considered. We will publish in our next issue the protests of our committees and our readers of the Loire-Inférieure and the ille-et-Vilaine. Already, we take a stand against Taldir-Jaffrennou's monstrous project, which singularly corroborates all the evidence that we have from Vichy.

== Vichy Regime ==
He signed an agreement with Marshal Philippe Pétain in December 1940 and participated in the Breton Advisory Committee (1942), seeking to promote Breton political, economic and cultural rights in the difficult war years.

In 1941 on the occasion of the thirtieth anniversary of the Breton Nationalist Party, Mordrel and Debeauvais organised a heartfelt tribute to Camille Le Mercier d'Erm, who founded the party in 1911. At this point, Jaffrennou abandoned his previous moderate regionalist position, which he declared "obsolete and outdated", and now advocated complete independence for Brittany. Rejecting his earlier decision to cease publishing during the war, he now wrote for L'Heure Bretonne and completely broke with his past views.

== After the Liberation ==
=== Arrest ===
On 7 August 1944, Jaffrennou was arrested by members of the French resistance on charges of having served the enemy and supported Pétain. He was also accused of wanting to make Brittany an independent country within a Nazi dominated Europe. He was acquitted and released. On 10 August 1944, he was arrested again. After a brief incarceration at the Chateau Lancien in Carhaix, he was taken to the St Charles prison in Quimper. In early June 1945, he was transferred to Mesgloaguen, another prison. He was charged with acts which might harm the national defense, association with the Germans and denunciation of patriots. He was put on trial before the Court of Justice.

=== Trial ===
After the Liberation, the French police found a list of denunciations that had been sent to the Germans. None were written by Jaffrennou. However, M. Baudet-Germain, a Vichy official, (Secretary General of the Prefecture Regional Rennes), said he had received a letter from Jaffrennou denouncing the Resistance leader Adolphe Le Goaziou. Baudet-Germain affirmed he had copied the original before burning it. Requested to produce his copy of the original denunciation M. Baudet-Germain said he had destroyed his copies as well. There was no physical evidence against Jaffrennou. However the testimony was sufficient to convict Jaffrennou to 5 years imprisonment, confiscation of a quarter of his property and national indignity.

Le Goaziou, who had been made President of the Finistère Departmental Liberation Committee, said he has always maintained a good relationship with Jaffrennou, never doubted his sincerity, and shared his regionalist political beliefs, but he regretted that he had sullied his reputation by dealing with Vichy. He said that he had been arrested before the date of the alleged denunciation, a conclusion supported by the report of the inspectors dated 5 December 1943 and sent to the Commissioner of Police Nationale de Quimper.

It is also believed that the famous Austrian Jewish writer Leo Perutz, a member of the Gorsedd of Brittany, wrote two letters, one addressed to the Attorney General of the Court of Appeal of Rennes on 16 July 1945, (No. 430) the other to General Charles de Gaulle, (No. 431) of Tel Aviv (Israel), on 1 October 1945, to defend Jaffrennou. As a result of international interventions in particular from Great Britain and Israel, Jaffrennou was pardoned, initially in 1945 and then definitively in 1946 by Georges Bidault, President of the Council of Ministers.

=== Exile ===
Released in 1946 he never returned to Brittany. In 1947 he resumed the leadership of the Gorsedd. He retired to Le Mans and then to Bergerac, where he died on 23 March 1956. He is buried in Carhaix.

== Bibliography ==
- Gwenc'hlan Le Scouëzec, L'Affaire Taldir: Le Grand Druide était innocent.
- Philippe Le Stum, Le Néo-druidisme en Bretagne (Éditions Ouest-France ).
- A la cour de justice: l'épilogue de l'affaire Jaffrennou, La voix de l'ouest, N°129, juin 1945.
