= Tekos =

Tekos may refer to:

- Teko people, an Amerindian tribe in French Guiana
- TeKoS, a Belgian "Nieuw Rechts" publication
