= Gerina Dunwich =

American astrologer, occult historian

- Born: December 27, 1959 (age 66); Chicago, Illinois, U.S.
- Occupations: Author, Freelance Writer
- Writing career
- Genres: non-fiction, poetry
- Subject: Wicca Witchcraft Occult

Gerina Dunwich (born 27 December 1959) is a professional astrologer, occult historian, and New Age author best known for her books on Wicca and various occult subjects.

== Bibliography ==
The following is a complete list of Gerina Dunwich's published works to date:

- Candlelight Spells (1988) Citadel Press ISBN 0-8065-1106-0
- The Magick of Candleburning (1989) Citadel Press ISBN 0-8065-1141-9
- Circle of Shadows (1990) Golden Isis Press ISBN 0-9628638-0-7
- The Concise Lexicon of the Occult (1990) Citadel Press ISBN 0-8065-1191-5
- Wicca Craft (1991) Citadel Press ISBN 0-8065-1238-5; ISBN 85-286-0150-1 (Portuguese); ISBN 3-478-08613-2 (German)
- Secrets of Love Magick (1992) Citadel Press ISBN 0-8065-1365-9; ISBN 3-635-60303-1 (German); ISBN 85-286-0325-3 (Portuguese); ISBN 0-7090-5162-X (British)
- The Wicca Spellbook (1993) Citadel Press ISBN 0-8065-1476-0
- The Wicca Book of Days (1995) Citadel Press ISBN 0-8065-1685-2; ISBN 0-7522-2108-6 (British)
- The Wicca Source Book (1996) Citadel Press ISBN 0-8065-1830-8
- The Wicca Garden (1996) Citadel Press ISBN 0-8065-1777-8
- Wicca Love Spells (1996) Citadel Press ISBN 0-8065-1782-4
- A Wiccan’s Guide to Prophecy & Divination (1997) Citadel Press ISBN 0-8065-1864-2
- Everyday Wicca (1997) Citadel Press ISBN 0-8065-1869-3
- Wicca Candle Magick (1997) Citadel Press ISBN 0-8065-1831-6; ISBN 85-286-0865-4 (Portuguese)
- Magick Potions (1998) Citadel Press ISBN 0-8065-1982-7
- Wicca A to Z (1998) Citadel Press ISBN 0-8065-1930-4; ISBN 0-7522-2107-8 (British)
- Wicca Source Book - Revised 2nd Ed. (1998) Citadel Press ISBN 0-8065-2027-2
- The Wiccan's Dictionary of Prophecy and Omens (1999) Citadel Press ISBN 0-8065-2067-1
- The Pagan Book of Halloween (2000) Penguin/Compass ISBN 0-14-019616-1
- Your Magickal Cat (2000) Citadel Press ISBN 0-8065-2094-9
- The Modern Witch's Complete Sourcebook (2001) Citadel Press ISBN 0-8065-2293-3
- Exploring Spellcraft (2001) New Page Books ISBN 1-56414-494-1
- Herbal Magick (2002) New Page Books ISBN 1-56414-575-1
- The Cauldron of Dreams (2002) Original Publications ISBN 0-942272-74-9
- A Witch's Guide to Ghosts and the Supernatural (2002) New Page Books ISBN 1-56414-616-2
- A Witch's Book of Spells (2002)
- Dunwich's Guide to Gemstone Sorcery (2003) New Page Books ISBN 1-56414-672-3
- Phantom Felines and Other Ghostly Animals (2006) Citadel Press ISBN 0-8065-2752-8
- A Witch's Halloween (2007) Adams Media ISBN 1-59869-340-9
- Cauldron of Blood (2026) HellBound Books Publishing ISBN 978-1-966296-41-6

In addition to her own book writing, Gerina Dunwich has contributed to:

- Circles, Groves and Sanctuaries by Dan & Pauline Campanelli (Llewellyn, 1992)
- The Cat Book of Lists by Stephen J. Spignesi (New Page Books, 2001)
- A Witch Like Me by Sirona Knight (New Page Books, 2001)
- The Witch Book by Raymond Buckland (Visible Ink Press, 2002)
- Haunted Northern New York by Cheri Revai (North Country Books, 2002)
- The Action Hero's Handbook by Joe and David Borgenicht (Quirk Books, 2002)
- American Witch by Anthony Paige (Citadel Press, 2003)
- Encyclopedia of Haunted Places by Jeff Belanger (New Page Books, 2005)
- Llewellyn's Witches' Datebook (various years)
- Llewellyn's Witches' Calendar (various years)
- Llewellyn's Magical Almanac (various years)
- Llewellyn's Herbal Almanac (2001)
- Llewellyn's Spell-A-Day Calendar (2001)

== See also ==
- Modern paganism and New Age
