= Adolphe Le Goaziou =

French resistance member (1887–1953)

Adolphe Yves Marie Le Goaziou (April 16, 1887 – September 18, 1953) was a bookseller, publisher and member of the French Resistance in wartime Brittany.

== Early life ==
Born in Morlaix, Finistère, Le Goaziou studied at the high school in Saint-Pol-de-Léon, pursuing university studies at the Sorbonne where he took a degree in philosophy. Le Goaziou became a member of Le Sillon ("The Path"), a leftist Catholic movement created by Marc Sangnier. Returning to Brittany in 1910, he participated in the creation of an agricultural cooperative in Saint-Pol-de-Leon which brought together potato farmers. At the beginning of World War I, he joined the French army. He was wounded in battle in 1916.

He moved to Quimper in 1919 where he opened a bookstore and began to work as a publisher, specialising in literature on regional issues. Though a supporter of regional culture, Le Goaziou opposed the Breton autonomist and nationalist movements of the time.

== World War II ==
After the Fall of France in 1940, he protested against the nationalist and collaborationist weekly L'Heure Bretonne. He also opposed the foundation of the Breton Celtic Institute, which was created under the patronage of the Germans in 1941 at the instigation of German Celticist Leo Weisgerber.

Le Goaziou became president of the Union of Religious Bookstores and the Booksellers' Union of France.

Involved in the Resistance, he was denounced and arrested by the Gestapo in October 1943, but released in April 1944 for lack of evidence. A report by two police inspectors dated December 5, 1943, indicate connections with François Jaffrennou, who allegedly accused Le Goaziou and a colleague of being "the leaders of the [Resistance] movement in Brittany" and "friends" of England.

In April 1944, after the Liberation of France, Le Goaziou was appointed chairman of the Departmental Committee of liberation, for the Finistère region. He took part in the creation of Ouest-France, which followed the closure of Ouest-Éclair, banned by Liberation forces for collaborationism. He also created a monthly magazine, Nouvelle Revue de Bretagne which appeared from 1947 to 1953.

== Notable publications ==
- A. Saint-Gal de Pons, Les Origines du cheval breton, 1931
- Joseph Le Jollec, Un Siècle de vie cachée et de labeur fécond en Breiz-Izel (Preface by Monseigneur Duparc. Illustrations by Marc Choisnard), 1939
- Louis Ogès, L'Agriculture dans le Finistère au milieu du XIXe siècle, 1949
- Armand Rébillon, Manuel d'histoire de Bretagne
