= Scartaglen =

Village in County Kerry, Ireland

Scartaglen Scairteach an Ghlinne
- Village
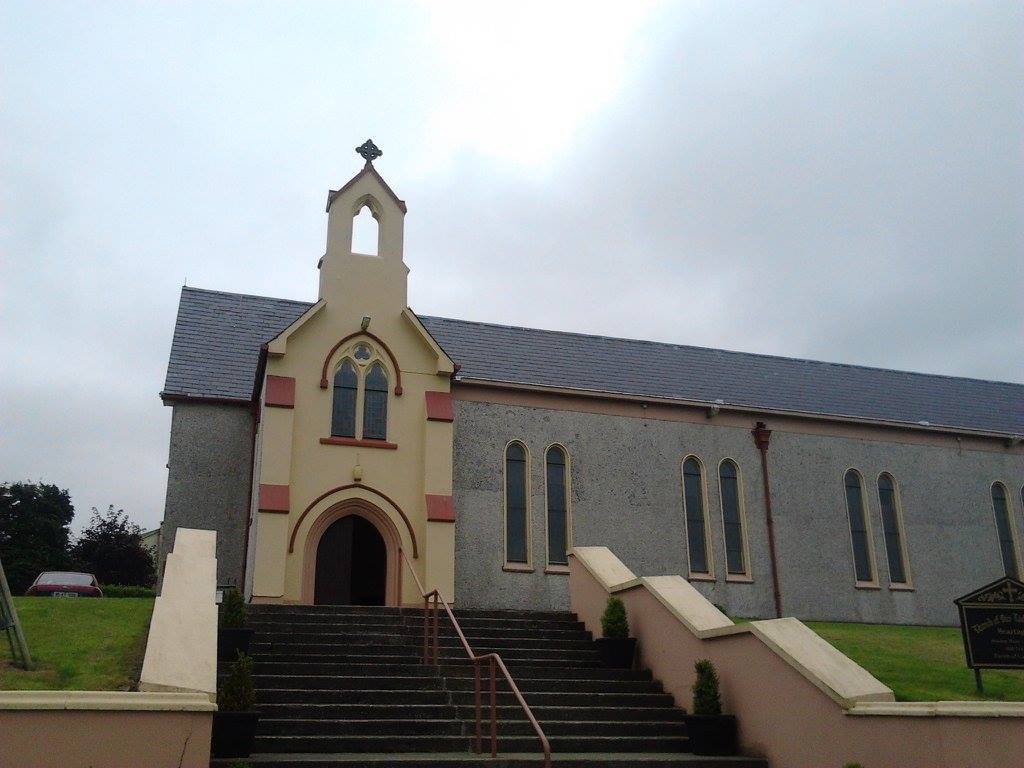
- Our Lady of Lourdes Church

- Location in Ireland Scartaglen (Europe)
- Coordinates: 52.1791°N 9.406°W
- Country: Ireland
- Province: Munster
- County: Kerry
- Council: Kerry County Council
- Dáil Éireann: Kerry
- European Parliament: South

Population (2011)
  - Total: 163
- (Scartaglin townland)
- Time zone: UTC±0 (WET)
  - Summer (DST): UTC+1 (IST)
- Telephone area code: +353(0)64
- Irish Grid Reference: R038039

Scartaglen or Scartaglin (Irish: Scairteach an Ghlinne) is a village and townland in the Sliabh Luachra area of County Kerry, Ireland. It is located on the R577 regional road, close to the town of Castleisland. As of the 2011 census, the townland of Scartaglin had a population of 163 people.

The local Roman Catholic church is dedicated to Our Lady of Lourdes and was built between 1928 and 1930. Scartaglin National School is a co-educational primary (national) school which had over 120 pupils enrolled as of the 2020 school year. The local Gaelic Athletic Association club, Scartaglin GAA, fields teams in the East Kerry Division.

== Notable people ==
- Neil Horan, defrocked Roman Catholic priest
- Eileen Sheehan, Irish poet based in Killarney

== See also ==
- World Fiddle Day
- List of towns and villages in Ireland
