= World Fiddle Day =

World Fiddle Day is an annual celebration of fiddle music, held on the third Saturday of May. World Fiddle Day events are held around the world, in areas where fiddle music is popular.

== History ==
World Fiddle Day was founded by County Donegal fiddler Caoimhin Mac Aoidh in 2012. The May date was chosen to coincide with the 1737 death of Italian violin craftsman Antonio Stradivari. The first Toronto celebration was held in 2013 and that year there was a celebration in Winnipeg as well.

In 2015, Canada declared World Fiddle Day to be National Fiddle Day as well. There were celebrations in Owen Sound, Ontario, St. John's, Newfoundland and Toronto. The Ottawa Fiddle and Stepdancing Competition was held in Richmond, Ontario.

In 2016 a World Fiddle Day celebration was held at Fort York in Toronto on May 21. Yosvani Castañeda Valdés demonstrated Cuban fiddling, while Dan MacDonald performed and presented a workshop about Cape Breton fiddling style. Other events were held in Owen Sound, Ontario and Scartaglen, County Kerry, Ireland.

In 2019 Kincardine, Ontario, held its fifth annual World Fiddle Day celebration with a downtown open air fiddling show. The Scartaglen celebration that year included lectures about the lives of local fiddlers Denis Murphy and Julia Clifford.
