= Jorge Camacho (painter) =

Cuban painter

Jorge R. Camacho Lazo (January 5, 1934 – March 30, 2011) was a Cuban painter.

Born in Havana in 1934, Camacho left his law studies in 1951 to dedicate himself to painting despite the fact that he never studied art. By the end of the 1940s, Camacho and his friend, Carlos M. Luis were well versed in contemporary painting. It was Carlos who introduced him to the paintings of Paul Klee, Joan Miró, Yves Tanguy and Giorgio de Chirico. In 1953, Camacho travelled to Mexico, where he lived for a year and met his colleague José Luis Cuevas- they both investigated the sources of Mayan culture. Camacho's first major influence was the Wifredo Lam exhibit at the University of Havana in 1955. Camacho was also influenced by the paintings of Rufino Tamayo and Francis Bacon.

He had two exhibitions in Havana, in 1955 and 1958, before moving to Paris in 1959. Once in Paris, Camacho immediately adopted Surrealism and in 1960 had a show at Galerie Raymond Cordier. Camacho met surrealist poet André Breton during an exhibit of works by Toyen in 1961 – his meeting with Breton truly tied him to the Surrealist movement. This exhibit also served as the setting for a 1962 event with the surrealist group, where he created an antireligious tribute to Oscar Panizza that featured aggressive paintings, including L'Immaculée conception des Papes.

André Breton wrote a preface to Camacho's 1964 exhibition at the Galerie Mathias Fels, describing his work as a painting of cruelty. Camacho's works, with their claw-like forms laden with ossuaries, borrowed their harsh themes from novels by Sade and Bataille. Camacho discovered esotericism with René Alleau, who exhibited his works in a show titled The Dance of Death, in 1976, at Galerie de Seine, writing, "It is essentially the Caput mortuum in its application, hence the emblematic importance of the skull in all his paintings."

Camacho was also fascinated with ornithology, which led to two exhibitions: History of Birds, an exhibition of paintings at Galerie Maeght, and an exhibition of his photos at Galerie Mathias Fels. Many of his paintings are haunted by the ibijau, a bird he observed on a trip to Venezuela. A visit to Peru inspired his first sand landscapes, which were shown in 1984 at Galerie Albert Loeb, under the title The Philosophy of the Landscape, in a reference to shamanism. In 2003, the same year as his retrospective at the Maison de l’Amérique latine, Camacho also had an exhibition at Galerie Tessa Hérold titled The Book of Flowers, which presented his new paintings of reinvented flora.

Camacho's avowal is best captured in his quote, "Surrealism is, without a doubt, the most important poetic creation of the XX century, because it is a world open to enchantment. As for the present? A series of works inspired by the magical and hermetic circle of the Shaman, that medicine man ever present in the life of all primitive societies. As to the future? A perennial openness to new horizons."

Camacho lived in Paris from 1975 until his death in 2011.

== Prizes ==
- São Paulo honourable mention, 1959

== Bibliography ==
- Christian Nicaise, Jorge Camacho, les livres illustrés, L'Instant perpétuel, Rouen, 2009
