= Neil Horan =

Laicised Irish Roman Catholic priest

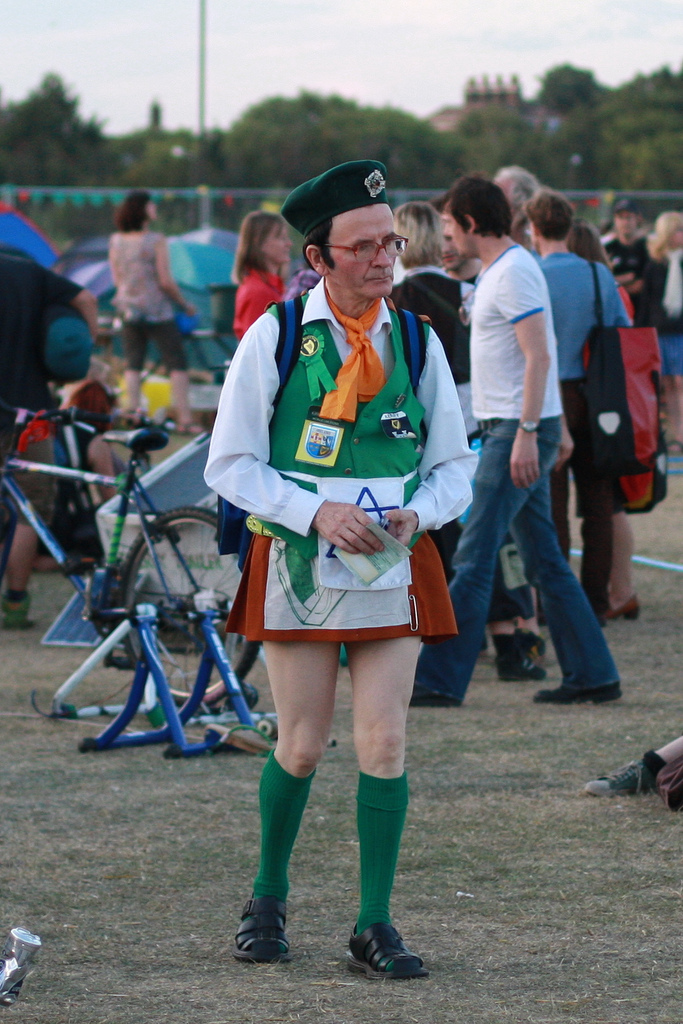
- Neil Horan at the Climate Camp, August 2009
- Born: Cornelius Neil Horan; 22 April 1947 (age 79); Scartaglen, Ireland
- Occupation: Former Catholic priest

Cornelius "Neil" Horan, sometimes referred to as The Grand Prix Priest, The Dancing Priest, or The Armageddon Priest (born 22 April 1947), is an Irish former Roman Catholic priest who is noted for his interference with the running of the 2003 British Grand Prix and the 2004 Summer Olympics men's marathon in order to promote his religious belief that the end times are near. He was arrested and spent some time in jail in Germany in 2006 when police found out about his plans to stage a pro-Nazi demonstration during the 2006 FIFA World Cup, which included a poster he made praising Adolf Hitler.

Horan went on to appear on Britain's Got Talent in May 2009. He danced a soft jig on the show, received a standing ovation by the audience and was put through to the second round. He did not make the live semi-finals. In 2017, he showed his support outside court for disgraced entertainer Rolf Harris. In 2022, he protested against Rishi Sunak becoming Prime Minister of the United Kingdom with a placard saying "Britain is a Christian country, it should have a Christian Prime Minister – not a Hindu one."

== Early life and the priesthood ==
The second of 13 children born to Catherine (née Kelly) and John Horan, he is a native of Knockeenahone, Scartaglen in County Kerry. He currently lives in London. He studied to be a priest at St Brendan's College, Killarney and St Peter's College, Wexford and was ordained in 1973.

== Incidents ==
=== 2003 British Grand Prix ===
On 20 July 2003, Horan ran across the track at the Formula One British Grand Prix at Silverstone Circuit, wearing an orange skirt and waving a religious banner, which stated "Read the Bible. The Bible is always right".

His protest took place on the 200 mph (320 km/h) Hangar Straight. Several drivers had to swerve to avoid him and the safety car had to be deployed to protect him and the competitors. Horan was tackled by track marshal Stephen Green, who removed Horan from the track before he was arrested. He was charged with, and pleaded guilty to, aggravated trespass and sentenced to two months imprisonment.

=== 2004 Epsom Derby ===
At the 5 June 2004 Epsom Derby, Horan was spotted by police and shoved to the ground moments before they believed he was about to run in front of the horses. He was later released without charges, although police did circulate information about Horan to other sporting events. The following year a court order prevented him coming within two miles of the racecourse.

=== 2004 Summer Olympics men's marathon ===
In spite of tight security at the 2004 Athens Olympics due to fears of a terrorist attack, on 29 August Horan (who had flown to Athens earlier that day) was able to run onto the course of the men's marathon event near the 35 km (22 mi) mark, carrying placards on his back and front.

Horan pushed Brazilian Vanderlei de Lima, who was leading the race, into the crowds alongside the course. After a few seconds Horan was hauled off the shaken runner by Greek spectator Polyvios Kossivas. Kossivas subdued Horan and helped de Lima up and back to the lane.

Horan was promptly arrested by Greek police, who were later criticized for not giving runners adequate protection. Following the encounter with Horan, De Lima suffered from leg cramps and muscle pain, although he continued running and completed the race. He lost about 10 seconds from his 25-second lead and finished third, after being passed by Italian Stefano Baldini and American Mebrahtom Keflezighi at the 38 km (24 mi) mark. De Lima later commented that "I think that the psychological shock was the greatest impact that I suffered. To be attacked like that, it was painful. I was totally defenseless and exhausted."

The head of the Brazilian Athletics Confederation launched an appeal based on the controversy surrounding Horan's interference in the marathon. The federation asked that de Lima also be awarded a gold medal, citing precedents set in past Olympic matches where extenuating circumstances have led to more than one winner in certain sports. This request was denied. Horan was given a 12-month suspended sentence by a Greek court and fined €3,000. Although he could have been sentenced to up to five years' imprisonment, the judge gave him a suspended sentence due to his mental state. Horan's brother commented that he had gotten away "scot-free".

=== World Cup 2006 ===
During the 2006 FIFA World Cup in Germany, Horan was arrested by German police before he could stage a planned protest. He had written to German chancellor, Angela Merkel, and The Kingdom newspaper in County Kerry, Ireland, informing them that he planned to dance a peace jig outside the stadium in Berlin before the World Cup final. He told The Kingdom he would carry posters declaring "Adolf Hitler was a good leader who was following the word of Christ", give the Nazi salute and light a candle for Hitler at the Gestapo headquarters. He spent two months in custody awaiting trial but was released on 15 September 2006 when the judge discharged the case.

=== St Mary's Hospital ===
During the waiting period outside the front door of St Mary's Hospital's Lindo Wing in west London before Prince William's first child was born in July 2013, Horan appeared in front of media with a sign proclaiming "Queen Elizabeth is very probably the last monarch of Britain" on one side, and "Queen Elizabeth is very probably foretold in the Bible" on the other. He handed out his business card, which read "Neil Horan, the Britain's Got Talent Irish Dancer. I perform at Weddings. My Mission in Life is to help prepare the world for the Second Coming."

=== David Norris letter ===
During campaigning ahead of the 2011 Irish presidential election, Senator David Norris's past came under scrutiny. The Irish Times reported that it had seen a letter in which Norris had politely responded to Horan thanking him for his pamphlet on "various Messianic prophecies". Norris admitted in the letter, "To be honest I haven't really read it in detail yet", but said that he would put his "feet up and read it with great interest" when he returned from a trip to Berlin. He added, "I will then pass it on to my aunt who is just 100 and has always taken a keen interest in this kind of material."

== Reactions ==
=== Dismissal from priesthood ===
In 2004, Horan was found not guilty of indecent assault against a seven-year-old girl in 1991. Although he admitted that he was naked while the girl tickled him and while they played hide-and-seek, during the court case he also claimed to own only one pair of tight-fitting green satin underpants that have never been washed as he needs them to 'always be ready for use', at one point Horan produced the pants from his pocket to show the jury.

On 20 January 2005, Kevin McDonald, the Archbishop of Southwark, laicised Horan, who had not worked as a priest for 10 years for health reasons including depression. Horan later made the following statement to the press: "I completely reject this decision. I appeal to the much higher court of heaven and the court of Jesus Christ ... I now cannot preach, I cannot give out Communion – I am little more than a pagan."

=== Legal restraints ===
On 13 April 2007, Horan was served with an Anti-Social Behaviour Order (ASBO) banning him from entering, on the day of the race, any of the London boroughs that the course of the London Marathon passed through.

== Other appearances ==
Horan auditioned for Series 3 of Britain's Got Talent in 2009 (airing 16 May) performing an Irish jig in traditional costume. The judges put Horan through to the second round. He was allowed to perform on the show because the producers "did not know" who he was. The makers of the show, TalkbackThames and Syco, defended showing Horan's audition on the show. Horan then appeared on The Ray D'Arcy Show on Today FM and revealed that he did not get through to the next stage.
