= René Alleau =

French author, historian, and consulting engineer (1917–2013)

- Born: René Eugène Pierre Félix Alleau; 6 June 1917; Sainte-Savine, Aube, France
- Died: 18 October 2013 (aged 95–96); Vallabrix, Gard, France
- Occupations: author; historian; consulting engineer
- Organizations: Grande Loge de France, Thebah Lodge
- Known for: Works on symbology, alchemy, occultism, and secret societies
- Notable work: Contributions to Encyclopædia Universalis, Bibliotheca Hermetica collection

René Alleau (6 August 1917 – 18 October 2013) was a French author, historian and consulting engineer. The focus of his numerous works are symbology and alchemy, the occult and secret societies. As well as his own works, he contributed articles in these fields to the Encyclopædia Universalis.

== Biography ==
Alleau studied in Paris, obtaining a Bachelor of Science, Bachelor of Letters, and Diploma in Graduate Studies in Philosophy. His thesis was supervised by Gaston Bachelard. Family circumstances following World War Two forced Alleau to switch to a career in engineering. Between 1948 and 1950 Alleau worked as an engineer in Douala, French Cameroon and French Equatorial Africa. Alleau retired from engineering in 1962 at the age 45 in order to focus on his studies of traditional science and hermetic philosophy.

From 1970 to 1976, Alleau was the director of the Bibliotheca hermetica collection for the French publishing house Éditions Denoël. The aim of this project was to republish ancient works of esotericism and make them available to purchase. Alleau contributed to the Planète magazine of Louis Pauwels and Jacques Bergier (authors of The Morning of the Magicians). In his later life he wrote online articles for Symbole associated with Frédérick Tristan and which focused heavily on the works of René Guénon.

During the 1950s and 1960s, Alleau was a close associate of André Breton, a prominent personality in Surrealism. René Alleau's article in the first issue of Surréalisme Même in 1961 was the occasion of the rapprochement between Breton and the young Frédérick Tristan, who was to remain a faithful friend until his death.

Alleau was a freemason, belonging to the Grande Loge de France. As a member of the Thebah lodge in Paris, he was associated with the Guénonian-Traditionalist School wing of the Loge, rather than the Anglo-Saxon element.

== Bibliography ==
- Aspects de l'Alchimie traditionnelle, Paris, Éditions de Minuit, 1953, 240 p.
- De la nature des symboles, Paris, Flammarion, 1958, 126 p.
- Les Sociétés secrètes, leurs origines et leur destin, Paris, Éditions Retz, 1963, 256 p.
- Histoire des sciences occultes (with Hubert Larcher and Gwen Le Scouézec), Lausanne, Éditions Rencontre, 1965, 112 p.
- Encyclopédie de la divination, Paris, Tchou, 1964, 551 p.
- Guide de Versailles mystérieux, Paris, Tchou, 1966, 287 p.
- Histoire des grandes constructions, Levallois-Perret, Cercle du bibliophile, 1966, 112 p.
- Guide de Fontainebleau mystérieux, Paris, Tchou, 1967, 287 p.
- Hitler et les sociétés secrètes, enquête sur les sources occultes du nazisme, Paris, Cercle du nouveau livre d'histoire, 1969, 367 p.
- Énigmes et symboles du Mont-Saint-Michel, suivi d'une étude historique de Charles de Cossé-Brissac sur l'Ordre de Saint-Michel, Paris, Julliard, 1970, 311 p.
- Guide de la France mystérieuse, Paris, Presses pocket, 1975, 251 p.
- La Science des symboles. Contribution à l'étude des principes et des méthodes de la symbolique, Paris, Payot, 1976, 292 p.
- René Guénon et l'actualité de la pensée traditionnelle, (dir.) with Marina Scriabine, Actes du colloque international de Cerisy-la-Salle, 13-20 juillet 1973, Paris, Arche de Toth, 1981.
- Alchimie, préface de Michel Bounan, Paris, Allia, 2008, 98 p.
- Various articles for Encyclopædia Universalis: Alchimie, Histoire des cartes à jouer, Divination, Démonologie, Magie, Occultisme, Sociétés secrètes, Tradition, Théorie des Éléments, etc.

== Filmography ==
- Le Mystère de la Licorne (1954), screenwriter

== See also ==
- Jorge Camacho
- Jean Robin
- Michel Bertrand
