= Ouest-France =

French newspaper

- Front page, 12 February 2014
- Type: Daily newspaper
- Format: Berliner
- Owner: Groupe Sipa – Ouest-France
- Editor: Philippe Boissonnat; Laetitia Greffié; Sébastien Grosmaître
- Founded: 1944; 82 years ago
- Political alignment: Centrism; Moderate conservatism
- Headquarters: Rennes
- Circulation: 645,344 (total; 2022)
- ISSN: 0999-2138 (print); 1760-6306 (web)
- Website: ouest-france.fr

Ouest-France (French pronunciation: [wɛst(œ)fʁɑ̃s], lit. 'West-France') is a daily French newspaper known for its emphasis on both local and national news. The paper is produced in 47 different editions covering events in different French départements within the régions of Brittany, Lower Normandy and Pays de la Loire. Its readership has been unaffected by the decline of newspaper reading in France, unlike most other dailies.

With 2.5 million daily readers (and a circulation of almost 800 000 units), it is by far the most read francophone newspaper in the world, ahead of French national newspapers Le Figaro and Le Monde.

== History ==
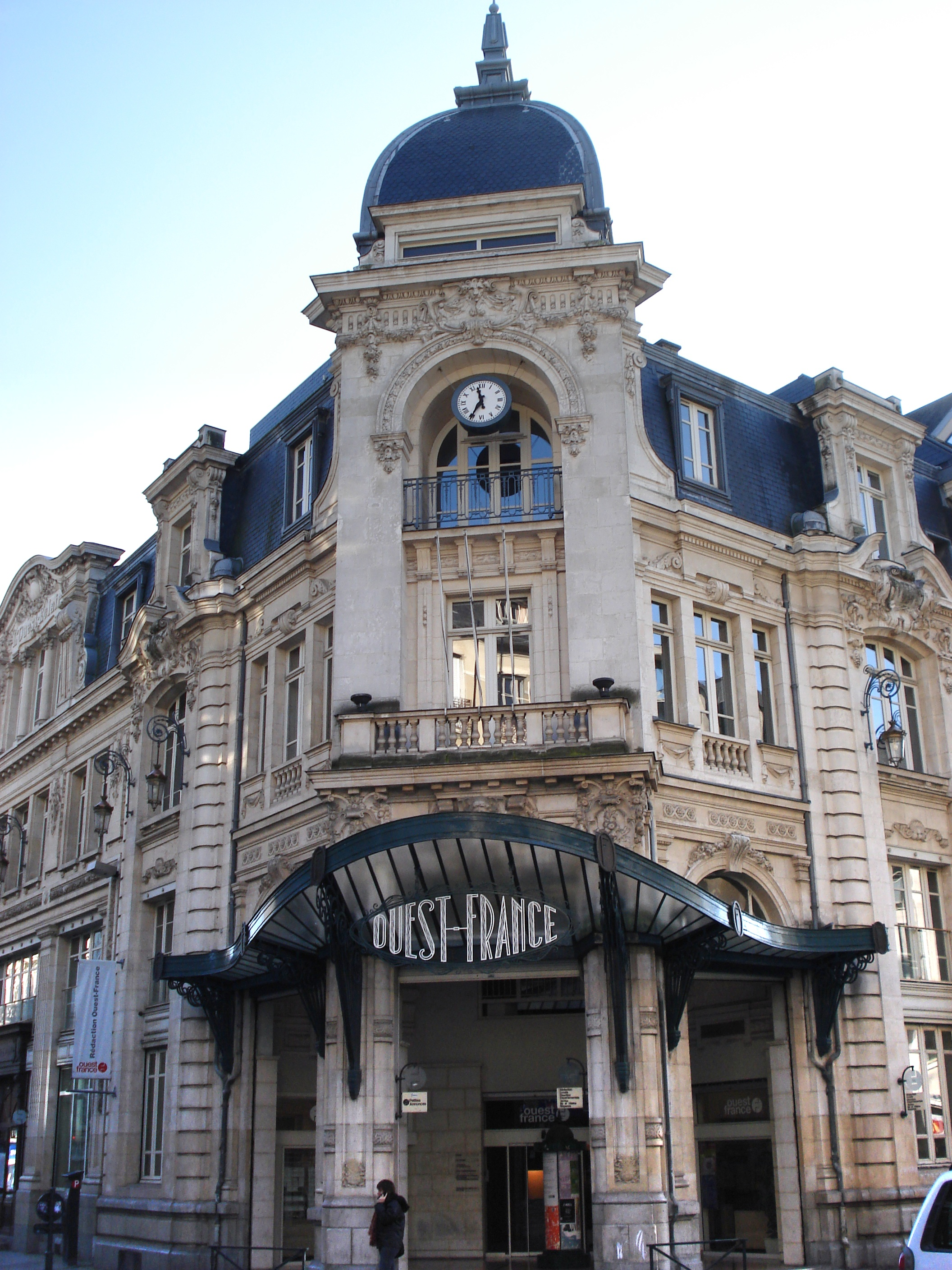
Ouest-France building in Rennes

Ouest-France was founded in 1944 by Adolphe Le Goaziou and others following the closure of Ouest-Éclair, which was banned by Liberation forces for collaborationism during the war. It is based in Rennes and Nantes and has a circulation about 792,400 (greater than any French national daily newspaper), mostly in Brittany.

Its editorial line has been strongly pro-European integration from the beginning, influenced by Christian democracy (Popular Republican Movement), now MoDem, Nouveau Centre or Union for a Popular Movement (UMP). With 2.52 million readers, Ouest-France is also the leading French-language daily in the world.

The paper had a circulation of 773,471 copies in 2001 and 764,731 copies in 2002 with a market share of 14.41%. The paper had a circulation of 637,463 copies in 2020.

=== The distinct editions ===
The 41 different editions are divided among twelve départements :

Département	Numbers	Circulation	Name of editions
Calvados	4	52,000	Bayeux, Caen, Pays d'Auge, Vire / Falaise
Côtes-d'Armor	5	95,000	Dinan, Guingamp, Lannion / Paimpol, Loudéac – Rostrenen, Saint-Brieuc
Finistère	5	46,000	Brest, Châteaulin / Carhaix, Finistère sud, Morlaix, Quimper
Ille-et-Vilaine	10	134,000	Redon, Rennes (Rennes nord, sud, est, ouest, centre), Saint-Malo, Vitré, Fougères
Loire-Atlantique	6	112,000	Châteaubriant – Ancenis, Nantes vignoble, Pays de Retz, Nantes ville, Nantes nord, St-Nazaire / La Baule
Maine-et-Loire	2	24,000	Angers – Segré, Cholet
Manche	3	33,000	Cherbourg, Saint-Lô / Coutances, Sud Manche
Mayenne	1	41,000	Mayenne
Morbihan	5	113,000	Auray, Lorient, Ploërmel, Pontivy, Vannes
Orne	2	22,000	Argentan-Flers, Alençon-Orme-Est
Sarthe	2	25,000	Le Mans / Sarthe nord, Sarthe sud
Vendée	4	72,000	Fontenay-le-Comte / Luçon, La Roche-sur-Yon, Montaigu / Les Herbiers, Ouest Littoral

== See also ==
- List of French newspapers
