= Louis-Albert Bourgault-Ducoudray =

French Breton composer, pianist and professor (1840-1910)

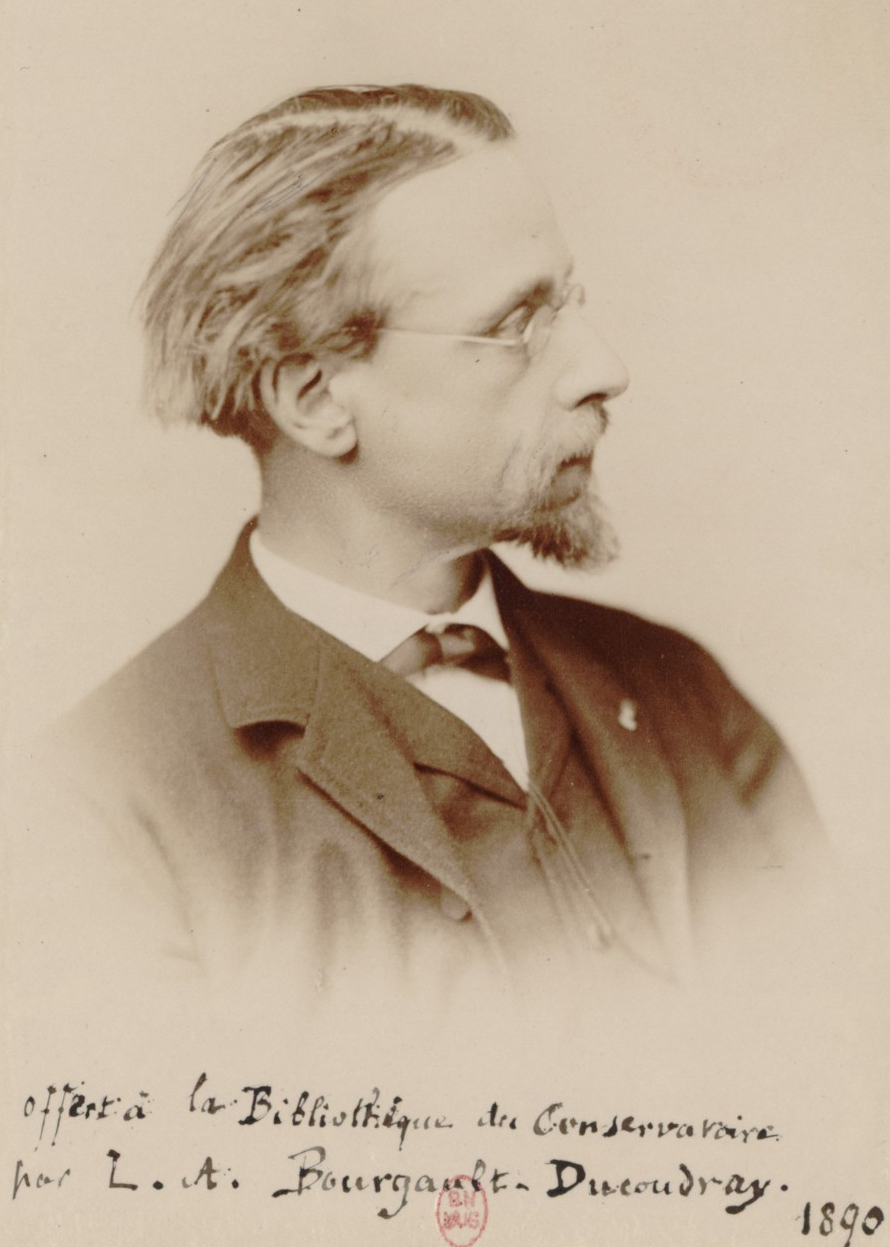
Louis-Albert Bourgault-Ducoudray (1890).

Louis-Albert Bourgault-Ducoudray (2 February 1840 – 4 July 1910) was a French Breton composer, pianist, and professor of music history/theory at the Conservatoire de Paris as well as a Prix de Rome laureate. He was born at Nantes and died at Vernouillet, near Dreux. Debussy was one of his protégés.

== Career ==
His bucolic upbringing near the family estate of Grézillières certainly added to his eventual fascination with the folklore, music, and culture of Brittany and other nations. Later in life, Bourgault would support the Breton Regionalist Union, an organization indebted to the propagation of Breton culture, ideals, and the notions of independence. He was also represented in the Goursez.

Bourgault was from a family of considerable political and ancestral influence. His uncle was Adolphe Billault, the famous minister of the Second Empire, personally selected by Napoleon III to act as France's Interior Minister from 1854 to 1858. Another of his uncles, Jules Rieffel, from Alsace, founded one of France's first agricultural schools called the École nationale supérieure agronomique de Rennes. His father was an important businessman, ship owner and munitions expert.

These family connections enabled him to study law before switching to music at the Paris Conservatoire under Ambroise Thomas, where he obtained the prestigious Prix de Rome in 1862 with his cantata Louise de Mézières. He served in the Franco-Prussian War and was wounded during the siege of Paris, receiving the Medaille militaire for conspicuous bravery. In 1874 he visited Greece, where he began studying Greek church music and folk music. In 1878 he was appointed professor of music history at the Paris Conservatoire. Among his many pupils were Charles Koechlin and Claude Debussy. Through music-making and time spent at the Villa Medici in Rome, he became good friends with Jules Massenet.

While living at the Villa Medici in Rome, his reserved personality did not serve him well. "Bourgault-Ducoudray was reserved and did not mix too frequently with the other pensioners" (Irvine, p. 30). Jules Massenet was one of those pensioners. Massenet had come the year after Bourgault-Ducoudray. Massenet wrote to Ambroise Thomas about an encounter with Bourgault-Ducoudray. Irvine summarizes: "One morning in March (1864), the reserved Bourgault-Ducoudray had finally paid Massenet a visit. They played bits of Bach's St Matthew Passion and other Passions, which Bourgault had not known before. Early in April (1864), Bourgault left to join his family in Naples, expecting to return to Rome only for the three summer months to write his envoi". His second envoi [first is not known at present] was a French opera titled Meo Patacca on a text by Berneri. On 27 November 1864, Irvine says that Bourgault held a splendid garden party at the Villa Medici that was attended by 20 men and women from the Trastevere, the old Jewish quarter of Rome across the river from Campo dei Fiori. The attendees were required to dress in costumes from the early 19th century. The party roamed all over the grounds of the Villa Medici ending up "in a brilliantly lighted sculptor's Falguière's studio, where six musicians with mandolins and guitars provided music for the costumed dancers." Massenet – who, it seems, was Bourgault's only close friend – was a party guest. The party must have been memorable because Massenet recollected it many years later. Massenet wrote: "The weather was fine and the scene was simply wonderful when we were in the 'Bosco', my sacred grove. The setting sun lighted up the old walls of ancient Rome. The entertainment ended in [Jean-Alexandre-Joseph] Falguière's studio, lighted a giorno, our doing. There the dance became so captivating and intoxicating that we finished vis-à-vis to the 'Transteverines' in the final salturrele. They all smoked, ate, and drank – the women especially liked our punch". Bourgault left the Villa Medici on Christmas Eve, 1864.

Bourgault had an immense interest in foreign music, but one of his more obsessive interests lay in pentatonic Eastern scales. Anachronistic for the time, he composed a two-part work in 1882 called Rapsodie cambodgienne with genuine gamelan instruments and Cambodian musical themes. The eventual performance of this piece in 1889 was spurred on by Bourgault and Debussy's attending of the World's Fair in Paris during the latter half of 1889. Between 1883 and 1892 Bourgault met with Pyotr Ilyich Tchaikovsky a number of times to discuss the burgeoning Russian composers as well as each composer's endeavours.

Bourgault was also interested in historical figures, notably fellow Bretons, and in collecting and editing Breton folk music, of which he was a pioneer. He wrote operas dealing with both Vasco da Gama and Anne of Brittany. He wrote many other operas, choral works and orchestral music and published several collections of folksongs, mainly Greek, Breton, Irish, Welsh, and Scottish. Among his final compositions was a mass. He also wrote a biography of Franz Schubert. Bourgault's primary librettist was Louis Gallet.

He gave a lecture concerning his philosophy at the 1878 Universal Exhibition in Paris. He said:

No element of expression existing in a tune of any kind, however ancient, however remote in origin, must be banished from our musical idiom. All modes, old and new, European or exotic, insofar as they are capable of serving an expressive purpose, must be admitted by us and used by composers. I believe that the polyphonic principle may be applied to all kinds of scales. Our two modes, the major and minor, have been so thoroughly exploited that we should welcome all elements of expression by which the musical idiom may be rejuvenated.

Bourgault was one of the first western European composers to be influenced by what is now known as world music. His devotion led many other composers, including his student Debussy, to study it more intensely. He also taught Victoria Cartier, noted Canadian music educator.

La Conjuration des Fleurs was revived in Paris in October 2024.

== Selected compositions ==
Stage

- L'Atelier de Prague (1858), comic opera in 1 act
- La Conjuration des fleurs (1883), "petit drame satirique", 2 acts
- Michel Colomb (1887), comic opera in 1 act
- Anne de Bretagne (1888), grand opera in 4 acts
- Thamara (1891), opera in 2 acts
- Myrdhin (1912), "légende dramatique" in 4 acts

Orchestral

- untitled Symphony (1861)
- Le Carnaval d'Athènes (1881)
- Rapsodie cambodgienne (1882)
- Danse égyptienne
- L'Enterrement d'Ophélie (1877)

Chamber music

- Anisykhia (Inquiétude) (1881) for violin and piano
- Sous les saules (1881) for violin/cello/clarinet and piano
- Abergavenny: Suite des thèmes gallois (n.d.) for flute and string quartet

Cantatas and oratorios

- Louise de Mézières (1862), cantata (won Prix de Rome)
- Stabat Mater (1868)
- Symphonie religieuse "Vivus resurgit Christus" (1878)
- Hymna à la patrie (1881)
- Le Psaume de la vie (1884)

Songs

- Trois Mélodies (Alfred de Musset) (1869)
- Trente Mélodies populaires de Grèce et d'Orient (1876)
- Trente Mélodies populaires de Basse-Bretagne (1885)
- Quatorze Mélodies Celtiques (1909)
- Mélodies du pays de Galles et d'Écosse (1909)
