= Breton Regionalist Union =

One of the URB's flags, adopted in 1907.

The Breton Regionalist Union (Union Régionaliste Bretonne or URB) was a Breton cultural and political organisation created August 16, 1898. It was a broadly conservative grouping dedicated to preserving Breton cultural identity and regional independence. It expressed the ideology of mainly middle-class and aristocratic groups to secure continuity in local administration and Breton culture.

== Origins ==
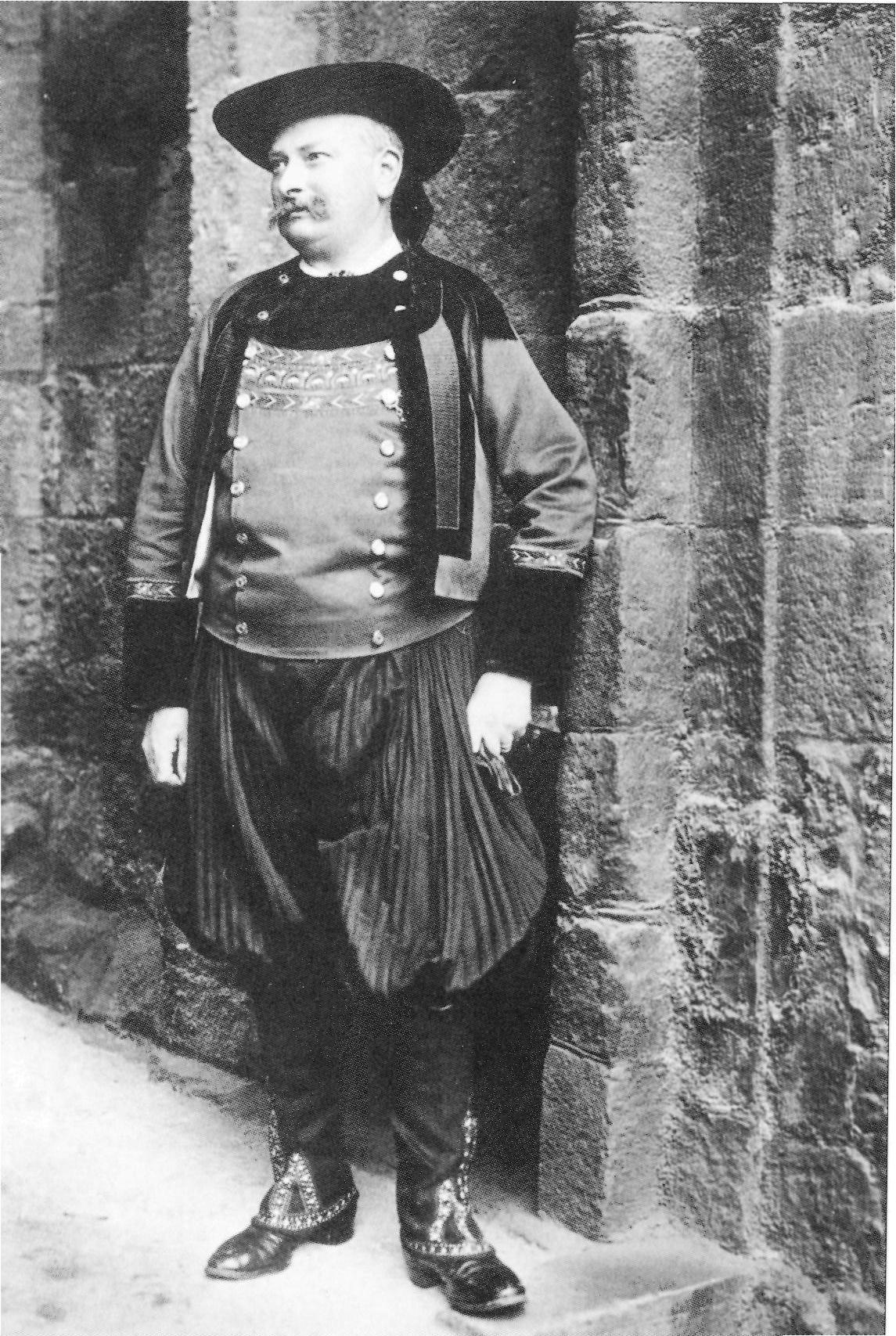
Régis de l'Estourbeillon dressed in Breton costume at the Celtic Congress of Caernarfon, 1904.

The Union was created in August 1898, in Morlaix, following festivals devoted to Breton culture. It was chaired by Anatole Le Braz, with the Marquis de Estourbeillon. François Vallée was named president of the section dedicated to Breton language and literature, with François Jaffrenou as secretary. Other important figures were the writers Alphonse de Chateaubriant, Louis Tiercelin and Charles Le Goffic. The photographer and publisher Émile Hamonic was also a member.

Sympathisers, if not supporters, included the politician Albert de Mun, the poet and art critic Jean Le Fustec, the linguist and grammarian François Vallée, the composer Louis Bourgault-Ducoudray, the singer Théodore Botrel, the scholar Rene de Kerviler, the composer Guy Ropartz and many others.

The prominent position held by the nobility and the clergy quickly alienated some of the more radical members and led to the foundation of the alternative Association des bleus de Bretagne (Blues of Brittany) in 1899, which had a more liberal-progressive agenda. Nevertheless, the two groups were never in open conflict. Le Braz was a member of both.

The URB declared socialism to be its enemy. Jean-Marie Déguignet, in his Memoirs of a Breton Peasant, wrote that the group was dominated by 'nobles and clerics' who wanted no input from the lower classes about their own culture.

== Gorsedd ==
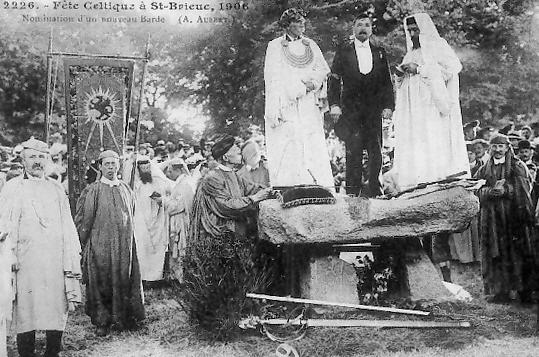
The Gorsedd of Brittany in 1906

As a result of the group's work, the Gorsedd of Brittany was created August 31, 1900 in Guingamp, following a meeting of the URB. Following Welsh examples, the group sought to revive Celtic bardic traditions. Each participant adopted a pseudonym and the title of bard. The members of Gorsedd promoted Breton culture either in the sections of the URB, or in the Gorsedd itself. This produced the Ti Kaniri breiz (House of Breton Song).

== Later activities ==
In 1912, Maurice Duhamel left the URB with Emile Masson, Camille Le Mercier d'Erm, François Vallée and Loeiz Herrieu to create the Breton Regionalist Federation. Le Mercier d'Erm and Masson went on to found the Breton Nationalist Party

Yann Fouéré was its vice-president from 1939 to 1945. After 1940, several of its members took part in "Sao Breiz", the Breton section of de Gaulle's Free French forces.

A bulletin edited by the Marquis of Estourbillon appeared from 1902 to 1943. It did not appear during World War I, the majority of the contributors being at the front.

== Bibliography ==
- Almanak kevredigez broadus breiz. Simon - Rennes. 1910.
- BRETON ASSOCIATION AND BRETON REGIONALISTIC UNION. Reports, official reports, memories. Congress of the 150th birthday in Rennes, 1993. Rennes, 1994.
