= Víctor Sánchez (writer) =

Mexican author (born 1961)

Víctor Sánchez (born December 9, 1961) is a Mexican author. He was initially inspired by the writings of Carlos Castaneda and by his own studies among the Wirrarika, said to be cultural descendants of the Pre-Columbian Native American Toltecs.

Sanchez's first book, The Teachings of Don Carlos: Practical Applications of the Works of Carlos Castaneda (1995), provides in-depth techniques and commentary on a path of "self-growth" based on the wisdom of the Toltec descendants. His approach in this book is bringing the proposals of Castaneda down to the earth focusing on those parts of Castaneda's book that can be applied in everyday life and used for personal development, while discouraging the use of psychotropic plants, which was prominent in mostly in the first book of Castaneda "The Teachings of Don Juan" . Sanchez has published four further books: Toltecs of the New Millennium (1996), providing an overview of and background on the author's experiences with the Wirrarika; The Toltec Path of Recapitulation: Healing Your Past to Free Your Soul (2001); and The Toltec Oracle (2004); and "Los Colores de Tu Alma" (The Colors of Your Soul - not yet translated into English) (2014). Sanchez's recapitulation technique bears some resemblance to Sandra Ingerman's soul retrieval technique, but is probably the most comprehensive approach to the subject that has been published so far. Other shamanic teachers using similar techniques include Michael Harner, PhD founder of core shamanism, and Ken Page, founder of Heart and Soul Healing. Some have associated Sanchez's work with Toltec author Don Miguel Ángel Ruiz, author of the Four Agreements. Sánchez usually respond to such association, that while he likes the general message of Ruiz´ book, they are not particular of the Toltec but could be found in many religions or world philosophies.

Even though Sanchez´ work prominently deals with the topic of shamanism, he does not accept to be described as a shaman, but rather as a researcher in the field of indigenous knowledge, shamanism and personal development. He states that "shamanism is way too important to leave it in the hands of shamans". His approach is that the core shamanic experience is about a shift in human consciousness that is meant to be performed by any human being and the emphasis in shamans with special powers to be admired or followed can be a distraction of the real task of "re-integrating the other side of our consciousness". For him the cult to celebrities or gurus diverts people's attention away from the key elements of real personal development which depends on each individual's action.

Due to Sanchez´emphasis on the importance of actual research, study and real life experiences; he feels skeptical about the fact that much of what is said and written about the Toltec in spiritual oriented books, come more from literary imagination, rather than actual research with the living Toltec descendants indigenous communities of Mexico or from the study of the ancient Mexican codices.

In his works Sanchez coins the term "anti-anthropology", likening his form of research to anti-psychiatry. His approach to the study of the natives he portrays is, in his own words, "not to transform them, but to transform" himself by looking at the indigenous ways of soul development, in contrast to the anthropology academic approach which focuses more on the material elements of the culture, political organization, economy, etc., while leaving aside fundamental matters such as the perspective and experience of indigenous cultures regarding the development of human soul or psyche.

Sanchez was sued by Castaneda for infringement of copyright after including an eagle, desert, and other iconography on the covers of his books similar to that used by Castaneda. The lawsuit was not related to the contents of the book but to the initial design of the cover, which was not authored by Sanchez but by his publisher, Bear and Company, Inc.

== Bibliography ==
- The Teachings of Don Carlos: Practical Applications of the Works of Carlos Castaneda (1995) ISBN 1-879181-23-1
- Toltecs of the New Millennium (1996) ISBN 1-879181-35-5
- The Toltec Path of Recapitulation: Healing Your Past to Free Your Soul (2001) ISBN 1-879181-60-6
- The Toltec Oracle (2004) ISBN 1-59143-026-7
- Los Colores de Tu Alma: Guía para comprenderte a ti mismo y a los demás (2014) ISBN 978-607-457-363-3

== Related works ==
- Earthwalks for Body and Spirit: Exercises to Restore Our Sacred Bond with the Earth (2002) by James Endredy ISBN 1-879181-78-9
- The Gospel of the Toltecs: The Life and Teachings of Quetzalcoatl (2002) by Frank Díaz ISBN 1-879181-86-X
- The Art of Stalking Parallel Perception – The Living Tapestry of Lujan Matus - Revised 10th Anniversary Edition (2015) by Lujan Matus ISBN 1-5174-2272-8
- Shadows in the Twilight: Conversations with a Shaman (2012) by Lujan Matus ISBN 1-4700-6324-7
