= Jean-Marie Déguignet =

Breton writer (1834-1905)

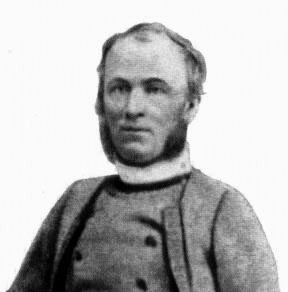
- Born: 19 July 1834; Guengat, Brittany, France
- Died: 29 August 1905 (aged 71); Quimper, Brittany, France
- Writing career
- Language: Breton and French
- Period: 19th century
- Subject: Peasant society in Brittany
- Notable work: Memoirs of a Breton Peasant

Jean-Marie Déguignet (19 July 1834 – 29 August 1905) was a Breton soldier, farmer, salesman, shopkeeper, and writer who is best known for his memoirs illuminating the life of the rural poor of 19th-century France.

== Life ==
Déguignet was born into a farming family in south-west Brittany. He spent time in the army—he was posted as far away as Mexico—and fought in the Crimea. His love of learning, and the extensive and eclectic nature of his studies and travel while a young man, led him to freethought and atheism.

In 1868, having finished his last stint in the military and accumulated some respectable savings, he returned to his childhood home of Quimper. There he reluctantly married the 19-year-old daughter of a farmer's widow in Toulven (south of Quimper), where he converted a struggling farm successfully to dairy with the help of the modern farming techniques he had picked up during the first half of the 1850s. He stayed on his farm at Toulven for fifteen years, but was then evicted for his persistent and prominent Republican agitation. His views meant he was unable to secure tenancy elsewhere and he was run over by his own cart.

During his convalescence, his wife, by now an alcoholic, bought a bar and left Déguignet to bring up their children alone. He turned to selling insurance, but soon had to take full-time care of his wife, who had drunk herself into very serious ill health. She died and the widowed Déguignet switched to selling tobacco from a shop in a parish west of Quimper. His retail tenancy was not renewed, however, and a local priest saw to it that he was denied the opportunity to rent an alternative shop.

Déguignet spent his remaining years living in poverty in and around Quimper. Worse, he went without the support of his children, who, he believed, had been turned against him by their mother's family. The insatiably curious autodidact and former farming success even attempted suicide.

== Memoirs ==
It was during these difficult twilight years that Déguignet turned to writing his memoirs. A first attempt was handed to Anatole Le Braz, who eventually got the first part of them published in a Parisian magazine in 1904. That was that, however, and with Le Braz in possession of his original script, Déguignet had to start over for his second attempt. He filled notebook after notebook with his journeys, observations, and experiences, as well as setting down heated criticisms of the people and institutions who had upended his successful life and truncated his ambitions—including, of course, the church and Le Braz. Recorded, too, were musings on philosophy, politics, and other topics. It was these notebooks that languished unknown until their discovery in a farm house, thereafter edited and published in France by An Here in 1998 as Mémoires d'un paysan Bas-Breton [Memoirs of a Breton Peasant]. An English translation followed from Seven Stories Press in 2004. One reviewer described the Memoirs as "one of the fullest descriptions of nineteenth-century peasant society by one who was born into it, spent his life kicking against it."
