= TeKoS =

Flemish far-right publication

TeKoS (Dutch: Teksten, Kommentaren en Studies) is a Flemish "Nieuw Rechts" (Nouvelle Droite) publication. It is published by Knooppunt Delta.

== History and profile ==
As with other Nouvelle Droite publications such as its inspiration Éléments, the themes in TeKoS are related to European culture, European nationalism, anti-egalitarianism and ecologism. The magazine has a new right stance. The editor-in-chief since its founding in 1979 is Luc Pauwels.

Co-editors:

- 1979: Hildegonde de Bois (until 1999), Marcel Deprins, Frans de Hoon (d. 1999), Paul Hendrik Leenaards (d. 1988), Karl van Marcke.
- 1982: N.E. de Leeuw, Janus Meerbosch
- 1985: Guy de Maertelaere
- 1989: Paul Janssen, Daan Goosen, Peter Logghe
- 1990: Erik Arckens (left 1999)
- 1991: Koenraad Logghe (until 2001)
- 1992: Koenraad Elst (until 1995)
- 1994: Dirk Bollen (until 2000), Kurt Ravyts (until 1999), Piet Jan Verstraete
- 1995: Jan Creve (until 2000), Joris Smits
- 1999: Erik Martens
- 2000: Jan Sergooris (until 2001), Frank Hensen, Arnout Collier
- 2001: Ingrid Berens, Wolfgang Goeminne, Marc Willems, Martine van der Heyden

== See also ==
- Groupement de recherche et d'études pour la civilisation européenne

== Literature ==
- P. Commers, De Conservatieve Revolutie in Vlaanderen. Een kritische analyse van het Nieuw Rechtse tijdschrift Teksten, Kommentaren en Studies, Leuven, KUL, 1997.
