= Erwan Berthou =

French and Breton language poet and bard

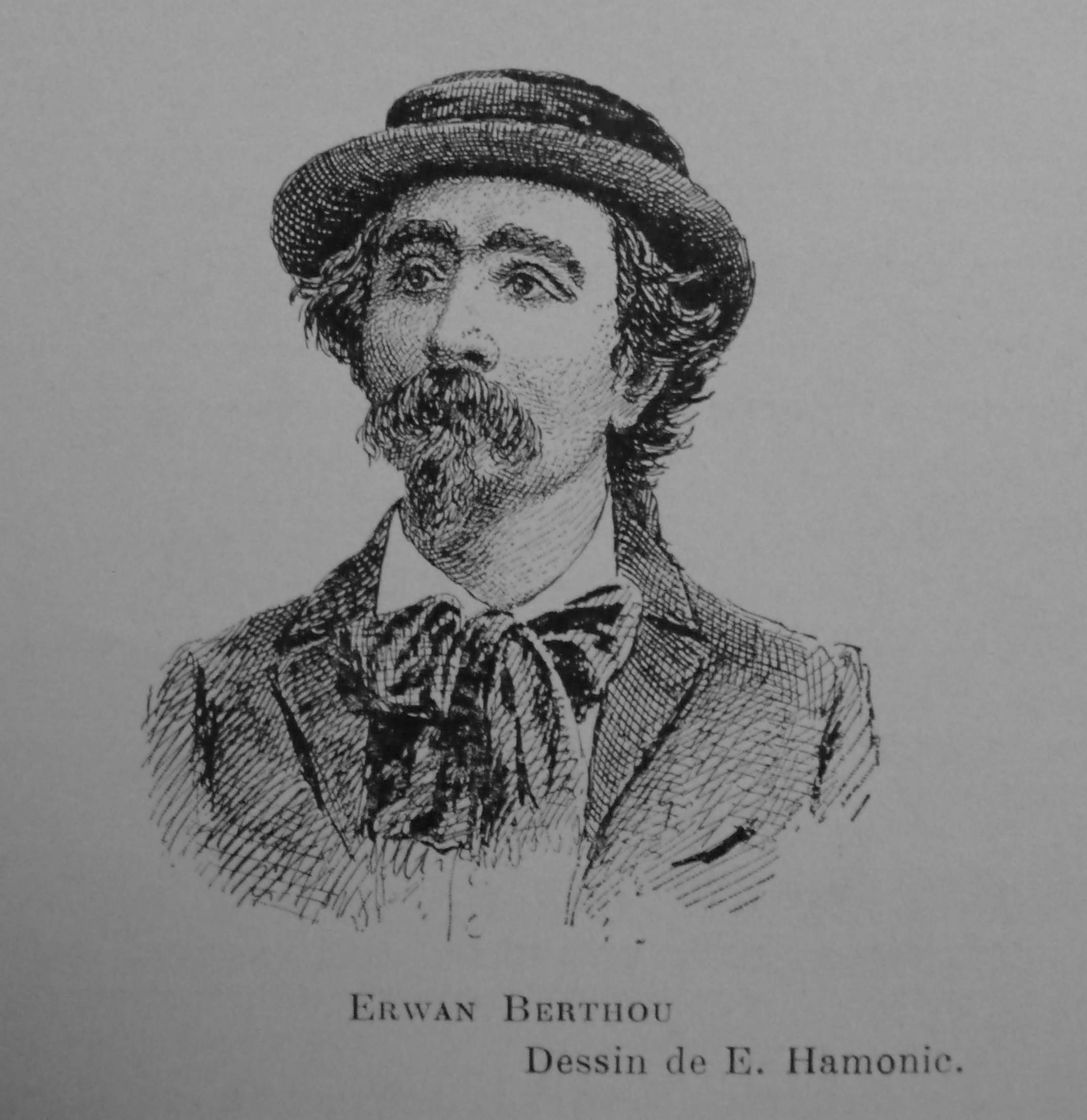
Erwan Berthou, after a photograph by Émile Hamonic

Erwan Berthou (4 September 1861 – 30 January 1933) was a French and Breton language poet, writer and neo-Druidic bard. His name is also spelled Erwan Bertou and Yves Berthou.

He was born in Pleubian, Côtes-d'Armor. He studied at the small seminary of Tréguier, then at the college of Lannion. He worked as an engineer in Le Havre, later moving in 1892 to Rochefort. On 12 June 1892, he married Elisa Mézeray.

He joined the Navy for five years. During his service he visited the Caribbean, Africa and China. Berthou returned to Le Havre in 1896. He then began contributing to the journals L'Hermine and Revue des provinces de l'Ouest. In 1897, he published a magazine La Trêve de Dieu (The Truce of God), but it folded after a year. He continued to work as an engineer, especially in construction of settlements in 1898 in Paris.

In the following year was one of twenty-two Bretons who went to Cardiff to establish links with Welsh neo-Druidism, being received at the Gorsedd. He also joined the Union Régionaliste Bretonne, helping to create the Breton nationalist movement. He participated in all stages of the creation of the Gorsedd of Brittany, of which he was Archdruid from 1903 to 1933, using the bardic name Kaledvoulc'h. He occasionally participated in Emile Masson's journal Brug. Much of his writing is imbued with pantheist ideas.

In 1906 Berthou and Jean Le Fustec published Eur gir d'ar Varzed, Triades des druides de Bretagne, a translation into Breton of the 46 theological Triads of the neo-Bards, according to a text first published by Iolo Morganwg with his own Lyric Poems, then in the Barddas of J. William ab Ithel (1862). The collection, in fact a forgery by Morganwg, was claimed to have been a translation of works by Llywelyn Siôn detailing the history of the Welsh bardic system from its ancient origins to the present day. Based on these ideas Berthou also published Sous le chêne des druides (Under the Druids' Oak), which described a mystical history of human spiritual and cultural evolution culminating in the achievement of "pure whiteness".

In 1918, he returned to live in Pleubian, to take over his parents' farm. He found it difficult to keep it solvent, and was reduced to great poverty a result of the inflation after the war. His last years were severely impoverished, leading to his wife's mental breakdown. Members of the Breton national movement organised financial assistance for him.

The following is an obituary notice in the Western Mail & South Wales Newspaper, Monday, March 6, 1933

BARD OF BRITTANY

M. E. BERTHOU'S LINKS WITH WALES

A valuable link between Wales and our cousins in Brittany has been severed by the death recently of M. Erwan Berthou.

He was for many years engaged as an engineer in Paris, returning on his retirement to his native corner of Northern Brittany. He was one of the leading poets and most distinguished writers in the Breton tongue, and also wrote French verse of quality.

He followed M. Ian ar Fustek as the Archdruid ("Y Derwydd Mawr") of Brittany in 1910, and was officially recognised by the Welsh Gorsedd, having been publicly welcomed by "Dyfed" at the Carmarthen National Eisteddfod in 1911.

A few years ago a private fund in recognition of Berthou's services to Celtic literature was organised in Wales by Mr. D. Rhys Phillips, of Swansea, and Dr. P. Diverres.

== Writings ==
- Cœur breton, premières poésies, 1892
- La Lande fleurie, 1894
- Les Fontaines miraculeuses, 1896
- Âmes simples, dramatic poem, 1896
- La Semaine des Quatre Jeudis, ballads, 1898
- Le Pays qui Parle, poem, 1903.
- Dre an dellen hag ar c'horn-boud. (By the harp and by the horn of war). Saint-Brieuc/ Paris René Prud'homme & Moriz an Dault 1904
- Triades des Bardes de l’île de Bretagne, 1906
- Istor Breiz, 1910.
- Kevrin Barzed Breiz, treatise of Breton language versification, 1912.
- Les Vessies pour des Lanternes, tract, 1913.
- Lemenik, skouer ar Varzed, 1914.
- Ivin ha Lore, gwerziou, 1914.
- Dernière Gerbe, poems, 1914.
- Avalou Stoup, rimadellou, 1914.
- Hostaliri Surat, 1914.
- Daouzek Abostol, 1928.
- Sous le chêne des druides P. Heugel Editeur 1931
- En Bro-Dreger a-dreuz parkoù (1910-1911), republished
- Lemenik: skouer ar varzhed. - Lesneven : "Hor yezh", 2001
