= Koenraad Logghe =

Flemish far-right modern pagan

Koenraad Logghe (born 1963) is a Flemish former proponent of the European New Right and practitioner of Germanic neopaganism, founder of the Werkgroep Traditie neopagan organization (the successor of Logghe's 1983 "Order of Eternal Return" and co-founding group of the World Congress of Ethnic Religions) which he left in the summer of 2008. Under Logghe, Werkgroep Traditie combined neopaganism with "Traditionalism" in the sense of René Guénon and Julius Evola.

In a 1984 interview with The Hague Post on contributions by Mellie Uyldert endorsed the latter's racialist position, saying that "we must go back to nature and keep our own race pure" and called for respect for the "ideals" of the Dutch volunteers to the SS "fighting the Russian threat" at the Eastern Front. From the mid-1980s, Logghe became active in right-extremist circles of the Flemish Movement such as the Westland division of the Nationalistisch Jongstudentenverbond (NJSV), participating in the Belgian New Right journal L'Anneau.

In 1989 he joined the editorial team of the Flanders New Right journal Teksten, Kommentaren en Studies. From 1998 on, he has distanced himself from his fascist past, although he still maintained relation with fascists into the 2000s (decade) (Zomers 2003). The SIMPOS study group (foundation for information on social problems surrounding occult movements) in a 2001 article in Religie en Mystiek identify Logghe as an example of right extremist tendencies within neopaganism, connecting him with the ultra-right Voorpost group. Other proponents of far-right neopaganism in Flanders include the Vlaams Heidens Front.

== Publications ==
- Tussen hamer en staf: Voorkristelijke symboliek in de Nederlanden en elders in Europa, 1992
- De Graal: tussen heidense en christelijke erfenis The holy grail: between pagan and Christian heritage 1997
- Ontslaap nu in mijn armen mijn lief - Het doodsgebeuren: een heidens alternatief, Traditie, 1996.
- Gewoon klaproos zijn - Heidens geïnspireerde poëzie uit de Nederlanden, Traditie, 1998,
- Dr. Jan de Vries, Nederlands bekendste Germanist en volkskundige, Wijnegem, Deltapers, 1996, 36p.
- Mjöllnir, journal of the Orde der Eeuwige Wederkeer (1983–1986)
