= Per Vari Kerloc'h =

Per Vari Kerloc'h (born 1952) currently holds the title of grand druid of the Goursez Breizh, founded in 1899. He was born at Douarnenez, in the western part of Brittany. The position of grand druid is a lifelong appointment and Kerloc'h succeeded his predecessor Gwenc'hlan Le Scouëzec). In contrast, the Welsh and Cornish equivalents are now elected every three years. Kerloc'h has worked as a middle manager and trade union representative with La Poste. He is a native Breton speaker and a fluent speaker of Cornish. His bardic name is Morgan.

In 2008, Per Vari Kerloc'h was welcomed at the Welsh National Eisteddfod in Cardiff (Kerdiz in Breton). An article in English published in the newspaper "Connexion" explains that after 2 years as a disciple, it is possible to become an Ovate, Bard or Druid, as in Wales. This is different from Gorseth Kernow which has one order, bards, and a grand bard who is elected for just one 3-year period.

oursez Breizh has members who follow different faiths, including Christians, Jews, and atheists, on the principle that anyone living in Brittany is Breton. However, there are hopes that a younger leader rooted in Breton language and culture will refocus the Goursez on Breton cultural matters, as was the original intent of the movement.

== Bibliography ==
- Hanes Gorsedd y Beirdd (authoritative chapter on the Breton Gorsedd written in Welsh). Barddas, 1991.
