= The Four Agreements =

1997 American self-help book by Miguel Ruiz

The Four Agreements: A Practical Guide To Personal Freedom
- Author: Don Miguel Ruiz
- Language: English
- Series: Toltec Wisdom
- Genre: Spirituality, self-help, personal growth
- Published: 1997 (Amber-Allen Publishing)
- Publication place: United States
- Media type: Book
- ISBN: 9781878424310

The Four Agreements: A Practical Guide to Personal Freedom is a self-help book by Don Miguel Ruiz with Janet Mills. It outlines a code of conduct, said by the author to be based on Toltec teachings that aim to improve one’s life. It was first published in 1997 by Amber-Allen Publishing in San Rafael, California, and is currently published by Tarcher /Penguin Random House.

It gained popularity after being endorsed by Oprah Winfrey on The Oprah Winfrey Show in 2001 and again in 2013. It was also on The New York Times bestseller list for over a decade.

== Overview ==
According to the author, the book is inspired by a set of the Toltec people's spiritual beliefs. The intent of the book is to help readers explore "freedom", "happiness", and "love".

The central point of the book is that a person's life is determined by agreements they have made with themselves, with others, with God, and with society as a whole. Through these agreements, one determines how they see themselves, what is possible for them, how they should behave, and their worth as a person.

The Four Agreements:

- “Be impeccable with your word”
- “Don’t take anything personally”
- “Don’t make assumptions”
- “Always do your best”

Chapters include the relevant linguistic and historical context for each topic. Ruiz says that by making a pact with the agreements described in the book, the individual is able to create a happier and more successful life.

== Reception ==
The book has sold approximately 15 million copies in the United States and is available in 53 languages. (Note: These languages include Spanish, French, German, Italian, Portuguese, Arabic, Chinese, Korean, Bulgarian, Mongolian, Turkish, Slovak, Czech, and Armenian.) In 2001, the book was featured in O, The Oprah Magazine, where the author was interviewed by Ellen DeGeneres. The book was also featured on The Oprah Winfrey Show in 2001 and on the television show Super Soul Sunday in 2013. The book spent two years on the Publishers Weekly bestsellers list and over a decade on The New York Times bestsellers list.

== Formats ==
The book is available in both hardback and paperback formats, as both an eBook and an audiobook, as a colour-illustrated book, a card-deck, and as an online course.

In 2010, Amber-Allen published an illustrated edition, to celebrate the book's 15th anniversary.

== In Popular Culture ==
In the seventh episode in the first season of the American TV series Barry, opposing mobsters are shown discussing the book and its influence on their thinking. Agreements 1 and 4 are mentioned in particular.
