= Mike Nichols (author) =

Mike Nichols (born October 16, 1952) is an American neo-Pagan leader and author of The Witches' Sabbats (Acorn Guild Press, 2005). Nichols taught Wicca for almost twenty years, from 1970 to 1989, in Columbia and Kansas City, Missouri, through the UMKC Communiversity and at his bookstore, "The Magick Lantern". He was the first Wiccan representative on the Kansas City Interfaith Council.

Mike Nichols has been a featured speaker on several radio programs, including National Public Radio. He received his Bachelor of Arts from the University of Missouri, with a double major in Communication and Psychology (specializing in Parapsychology). He has done graduate work in the field of Library and Information sciences.
