= Victor Sanchez (Dominican politician) =

Dominican politician

Victor Hipolito Sanchez Feliz former congressman, representing the Province of Azua, In the Dominican Republic. He was born on March 23, 1966. He is the son of civics professor Mr. Tirso Sanchez (deceased) and Mrs. Altagracia Millenia Feliz.

He is a graduate of Bachelor in Accounting from the Dominican University O & M. and completed the Master of Science in Development Policy in the Global Institute of Higher Studies in Social Sciences. He has played important roles in various private companies, as well as managerial and administrative functions in public administration, becoming Administrative Vice-Minister of the Presidency of the Republic. He was member of the Dominican Liberation Party, until he resigned citing his discomfort with president Danilo Medina’s administration, and joined the Modern Revolutionary Party as their candidate for Senator in the Province of Azua. In the elections of May 16, 2010, stood out as the country's most voted for congressman by obtaining 16,591 votes.

When he was a member of Dominican Republic’s National Congress (2010-2016) he authored many bills, mainly focusing on financial and economic development, macroeconomic infrastructure and social justice.

His most successful piece of legislature was the bill declaring Merengue as cultural heritage of the Dominican Republic. It establishes that the preservation and promotion of national music is essential in order to ensure its development and permanence within Dominican society, to foster its historical continuity and the cultural identity of the Dominican people.

On March 7, 2020, Dr. Santiago Hazim, National Coordinator of the External Sector of the Candidate for the Presidency of the Dominican Republic Luis Rodolfo Abinader Corona (2020-2024) swore in former Congressman Sanchez Feliz as political director of the southern region for the campaign.
