= Régis de l'Estourbeillon =

French politician and poet (1858–1946)

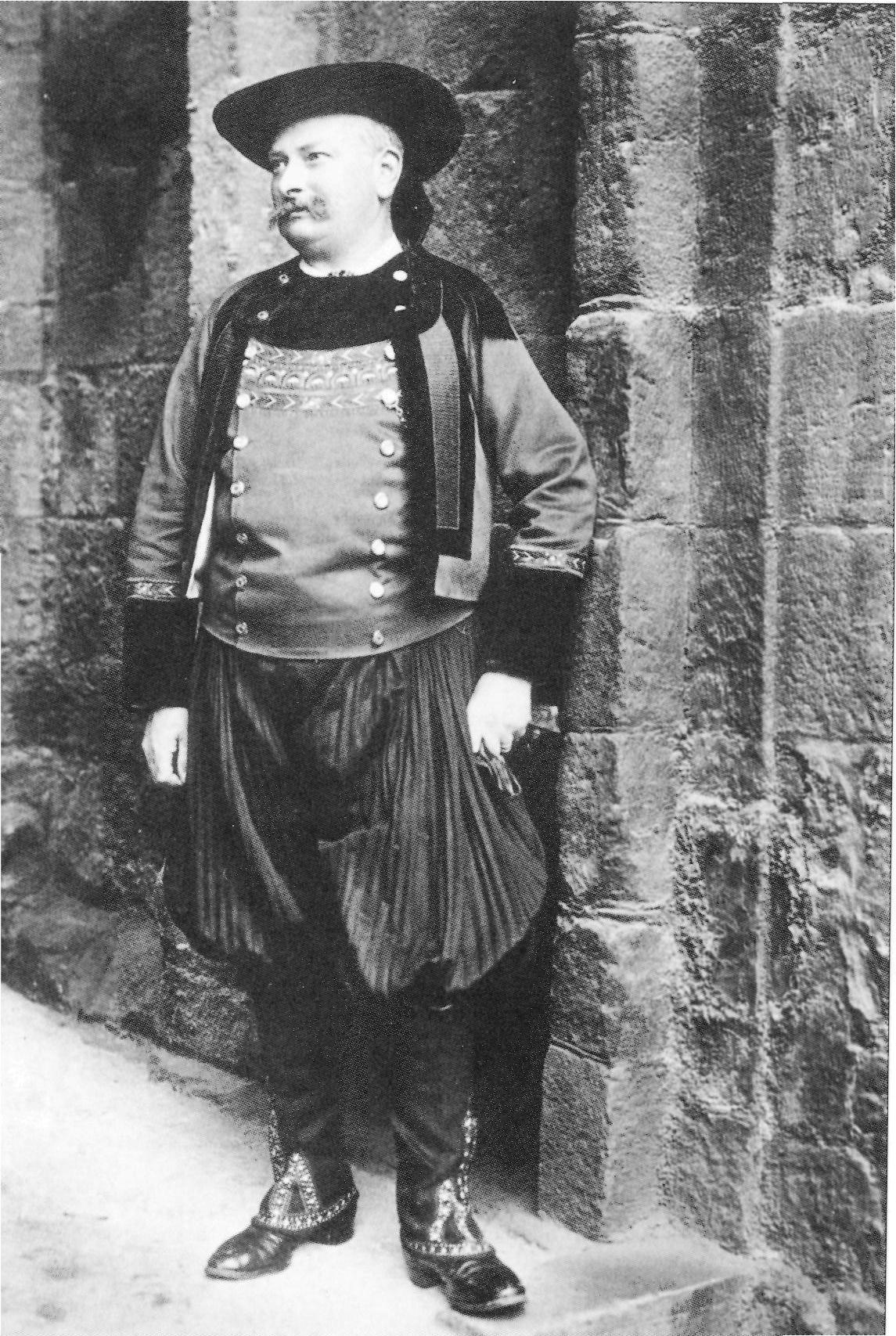
Régis de l'Estourbeillon dressed in Breton costume at the Celtic Congress of Caernarfon, 1904.

Régis-Marie-Joseph de l'Estourbeillon de la Garnache (11 February 1858 - 7 September 1946) was a Breton aristocrat, politician, and poet. He was associated with Breton regionalist activism. He is generally known as Régis de l'Estourbeillon, but held the title Marquis de l'Estourbeillon.

He was born in Nantes. He became interested in preserving Breton regional identity as a young man, founding the Breton Regionalist Union in 1898. He edited La Revue de Bretagne with the Count René de Laigue. The publication appeared from 1902 to 1943.

He was elected to the national Chamber of Deputies of France for the department of Morbihan, becoming one of the most active members of Action libérale, a rightist pro-Catholic faction within the Republic. L'Estourbeillon was associated with anti-Dreyfusard views, and attended a "grand reunion antisemite" in Nantes with Jules Guérin in 1898. Liberals and Drefusards left the Breton Regionalist Union to found the rival Blues of Brittany in the same year.

In 1909, deputed by the first district of Vannes, he led the delegation to lobby for the teaching of the Breton language in Breton schools and colleges. He attempted to interest the Minister of State for education Gaston Doumergue who refused their request by claiming that "teaching of Breton would support the separatist tendencies".

He participated in World War I as a volunteer, joining French forces at the age of 56. For his actions he was decorated with the Croix de guerre 1914-1918 and made Chevalier de la Légion d'honneur.

After the war he withdrew from national politics, but continued to pursue his demands for official teaching of the Breton language. In January 1919 he wrote a public declaration reasserting the demand published by Libre parole.

In the 1920s he became a member of the Breton cultural movement Seiz Breur, sometimes writing under the Breton pseudonym Hoël Broërec'h.

He died at the château de Penhoët, Avessac.

== Publications ==
- Les frairies de la paroisse de Macerac - par le conte Régis de l'Estourbeillon - Inspecteur de la société française d'archéologie, Nantes 1883
- Nominoé, père de la patrie - Marquis de l'Estourbeillon, député du Morbihan, directeur de l'Union régionale bretonne - Rennes MCMXII
- Le droit des langues et la liberté des peuples, Saint-Brieuc, 1919
- La Nation bretonne - Conférence sur l'histoire de Bretagne - par Mr de l'Estourbeillon, ancien député du Morbihan, président de l'ORB - 8 septembre 1924
- L'Ame de la Bretagne, ses légitimes revendications, rapport présenté par mr de l'Estourbeillon, ancien député au congrès de l'A.N.O. le samedi 20 mai 1933
- Pour nos costumes nationaux, la presse seule peut les sauver - Hoël Broërec'h - édité par l'union régionaliste bretonne.
