= Goursez Vreizh =

Fraternity of the Druids, Bards and Ovates of Brittany Breudeuriezh Drouized, Barzhed hag Ovizion Breizh
- Awen of Iolo Morganwg.
- Abbreviation: Goursez Vreizh
- Formation: 1899
- Founder: Jean Le Fustec
- Type: Breton culture Celtic Revival
- Headquarters: Brittany
- Website: gorsedd.bzh

Goursez Vreizh (officially Breudeuriezh Drouized, Barzhed hag Ovizion Breizh) is the national gorsedd of Brittany ("Breizh" in Breton). It often has delegates from the Welsh gorsedd and Gorsedh Kernow in Cornwall. The Breton organisation is itself based on the Welsh-based Gorsedd, which was founded by Iolo Morganwg in 1792.

== History ==
Théodore Hersart de la Villemarqué (1815-1895) was the first Breton to be made an initiate by the Gorsedd of Wales. He took the bardic name Hersart Kervarker. He created a "Fraternity of the Bards of Brittany" (Breuriez Breiz) but this did not lead to the creation of a Gorsedd.

- 1838: La Villemarqué, Auguste Brizeux and Jean-François Le Gonidec are adopted as honorary members of the Cymdeithas Cymreigyddion y Fenny (Abergavenny Celtic Union).
- 1843 (or possibly 1857, evidence is unclear): La Villemarqué founds the Breuriez-Breiz (Breton Brotherhood), whose activity is restricted to arts and linguistics, is founded.
- 1867: A small Welsh delegation goes to the international Celtic Congress.
- August 16, 1898: The Breton Regionalist Union is founded.
- 1899: A Breton delegation of twenty people is received at the Gorsedd of Wales in order to constitute the core of a Breton group. The Breton guests are made ovates, but not fully initiated. This year is regarded as the founding year of the Goursez.
- September 1, 1900: The new constitutive assembly meets in an inn at Guingamp. Jean Le Fustec (with the bardic name Yann ab Gwilherm; later Lemenik) becomes the first Grand Druid of the "Gorsedd of Lesser Britain".
- November 23, 1908: The Gorsedd Barzed Gourenez Breiz Izel (Gorsedd of the Bards of the Peninsula of Brittany) is officially proclaimed.
- 1936: A split in the Goursez causes the formation of the explicitly neo-pagan Kredenn Geltiek Hollvedel.

== Grand Druids ==
- Jean Le Fustec from 1900 to 1903.
- Erwan Berthou (also known as Kaledvoulc'h) from 1904 to 1932.
- François Taldir-Jaffrennou from 1933 to 1955.
- Pêr Loisel-Eostig Sarzhaw from 1956 to 1980.
- Gwenc'hlan Le Scouëzec from 1981 to 2008.
- Per Vari Kerloc'h from 2008.

== Gallery ==
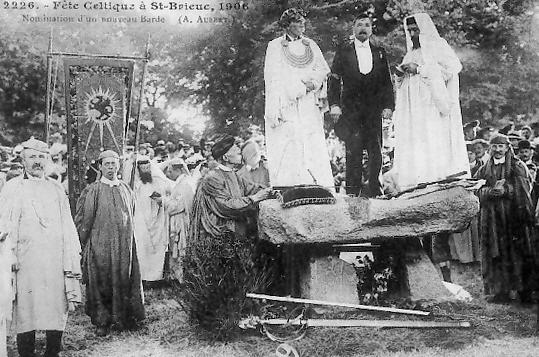
Assembly of druids of the Gorsedd, 1906

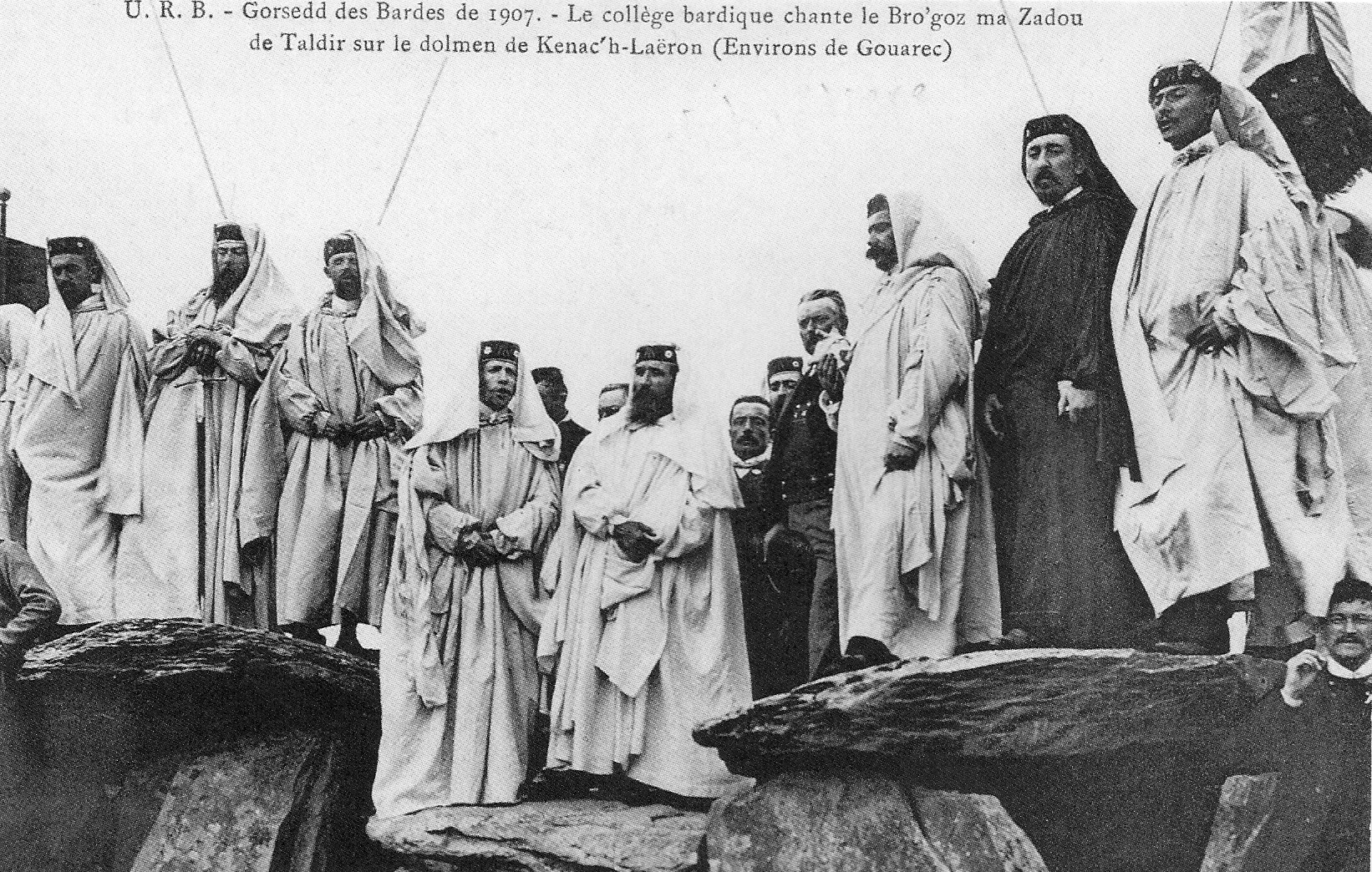
Bards of the Gorsedd singing Bro goz ma Zadou, 1907

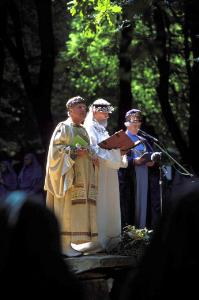
Centenary celebration of the Gorsedd, 1999

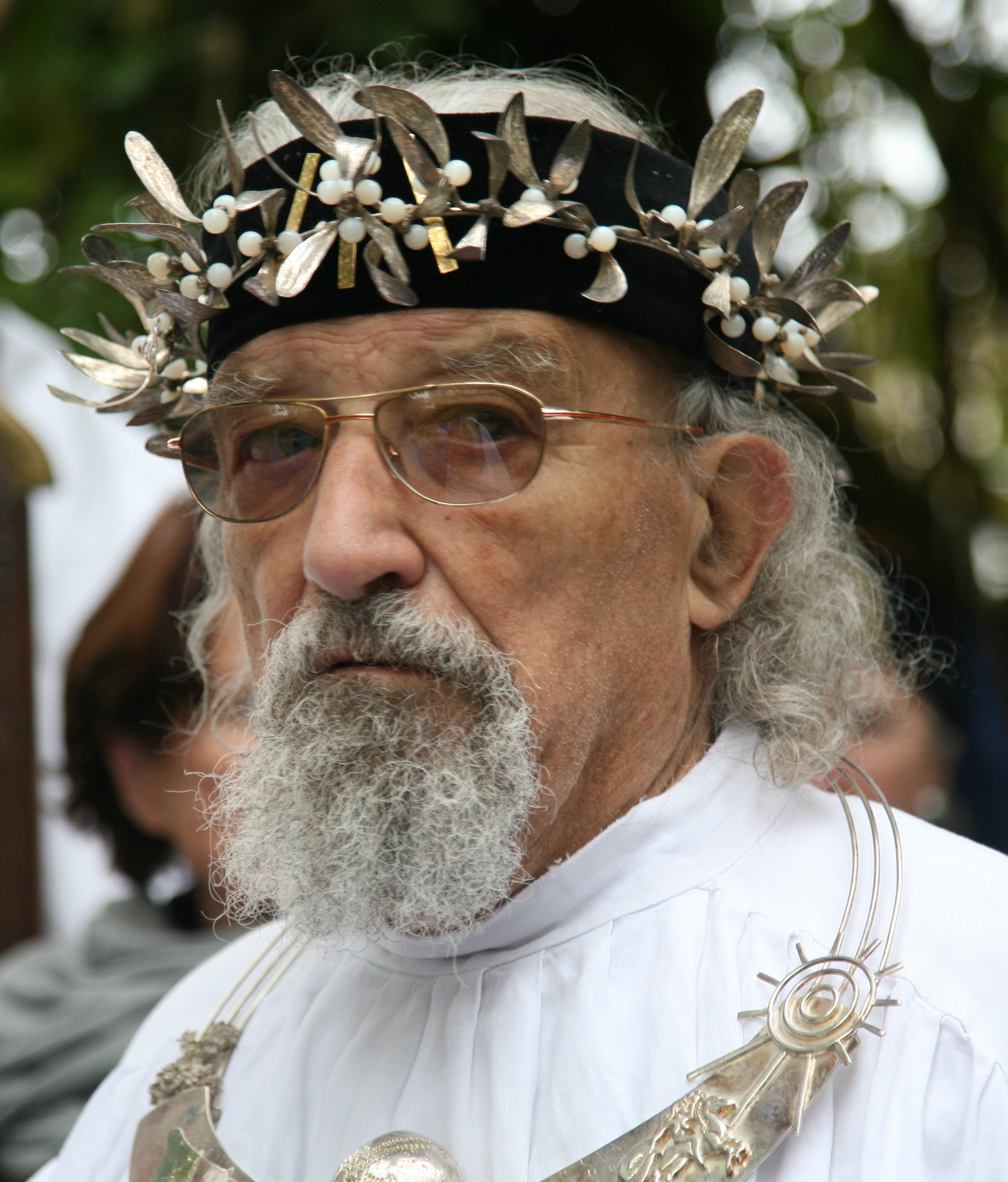
Grand Druid Gwenc'hlan Le Scouëzec, 2007
