= Eileen Sheehan =

Irish poet

Eileen Sheehan (born Eileen Flynn) is an Irish poet based in Killarney, County Kerry. She was born in the nearby village of Scartaglin in 1963.

Her poetry is written from a benevolent pagan perspective. Her work has been published in several journals and anthologies, including The Stinging Fly, The Kerry Anthology, Breacadh, and she was featured in I Am Of Kerry.

She has won both the Listowel Writers’ Week inaugural Poetry Slam 2004, and The Brendan Kennelly Poetry Award 2006. Her book of poetry, Song of the Midnight Fox, was published in 2004.

She is on the Poetry Ireland Éigse Éireann Writers in Schools Scheme and is currently employed by County Kerry VEC teaching Creative Writing at Killarney Technical College.
