= Anatole Le Braz =

Breton poet, folklore collector and translator

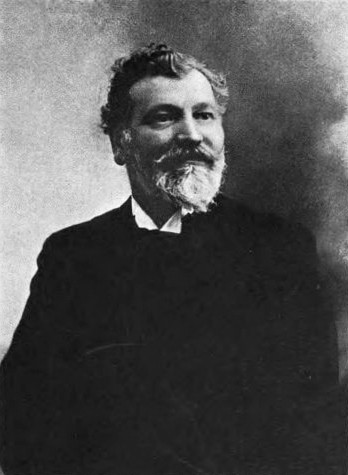
- Born: 2 April 1859; Duault
- Died: 20 March 1926; Menton
- Education: University of Paris, Lycée Saint-Louis
- Occupations: Literary historian, poet, writer, prosaist, historian
- Employer: University of Rennes (1901–1924)
- Political party: Breton Regionalist Union
- Awards: Chevalier of the Legion of Honour (1897); Officer of the Legion of Honor (1914)

Anatole le Braz, the "Bard of Brittany" (2 April 1859 – 20 March 1926), was a French poet, folklore collector, and translator. He was highly regarded amongst both European and American scholars, and was known for his warmth and charm.

== Biography ==
Le Braz was born in Saint-Servais, Côtes-d'Armor, and was raised amongst woodcutters and charcoal burners, speaking the Breton language; his parents did not speak French. He spent his holidays in Trégor, which inspired his later work. He began school at the age of 10 at Saint-Brieuc, and progressed swiftly to a degree at the Sorbonne, where he studied for seven years.

He then returned to Brittany, where for 14 years he taught at the Lycée at Quimper and gradually translated old Breton songs into modern French, continuing the folklore work of François-Marie Luzel. He often entertained local peasants and fishermen in the old manor house where he lived, recording their songs and tales. His book, Chansons de la Bretagne ("Songs of Brittany"), was awarded a prize by the Académie française.

In 1898, he became president of the Union régionaliste bretonne formed in Morlaix following the Breton festivals. In 1899, he joined the Association des bleus de Bretagne. He was made lecturer and then professor in the Faculty of Arts at Rennes University between 1901 and 1924.

Le Braz was sent on foreign cultural missions by the French Government twenty times. He made several visits to the US, Canada and Switzerland, lecturing at Harvard University in 1906, and at Columbia University in 1915.

During his 1915 visit, he married Henrietta S. Porter of Annapolis, who died in 1919. In 1921, he married Mabel Davison of Manhattan, sister of the famed banker Henry P. Davison. American novelist John Nichols is his great-grandson. He is the maternal great-grandfather of the musician Tina Weymouth, and the architect Yann Weymouth along with their six siblings.

Le Braz died at Menton on the French Riviera. Among the mourners was the French prime minister, Aristide Briand.

== Memorials ==
A number of memorials to Le Braz exist in Brittany. A large statue of him with a peasant storyteller was created in Saint-Brieuc, and a memorial stele in Tréguier; both were designed by Armel Beaufils.

== Musical settings ==
A number of composers have set Le Braz's poems to music. They include:

- Louis-Albert Bourgault-Ducoudray: Les Yeux de ma mie (1897); La Chanson de la Bretagne (1905). Contains: Berceuse d'armorique; Dans la grand'hune; Nuit d'étoiles; Le Chant des nuages; Le Chant d'ahès; La Chanson du vent qui vente; Sône.
- André Colomb: Nocturne (1914).
- Maurice Duhamel: Gwer-ziou ha soniou breiz-izel. Musiques bretonnes. Airs et variantes mélodiques des 'chants et chansons populaires de la Basse Bretagne (1913).
- Swan Hennessy: Berceuse d’Armorique = no. 2 of Trois Chansons celtiques, Op. 72 (1927); La Chanson du vent de mer = no. 2 of Deux Mélodies, Op. 73 (1928).
- René Lenormand: Sône = no. 4 of Mélodies tristes, Op. 39 (1903).
- Félicien Menu de Ménil: La Chanson de Bretagne (1906).
- Miloje Milojević: La Chanson du vent du mer (1917).
- Adolphe Piriou: La Charlezenn. Légende lyrique en 3 actes et 5 tableaux avec un prologue et un épilogue d'après Anatole Le Braz (n.d.).
- Guy Ropartz: Quatre Mélodies (1907).
- Alice Sauvrezis: Sône (1899).
- Charles Tournemire: Le Sang de la sirène. Légende musicale en 4 parties de Marcel Brennure, d'après Anatole Le Braz (1904); Le Chant de ma mère, Op. 25 (n.d.).

== Publications ==
- La Chanson de la Bretagne ("The Songs of Brittany"), poetry, 1892
- Tryphina Keranglaz, poem, 1892
- La Légende de la mort en Basse-Bretagne, 1893.
- Les Saints bretons d'après la tradition populaire en Cornouaille ("Breton Saints according to popular tradition in Cornouaille"), 1893–1894.
- Au pays des pardons, 1894.
- Pâques d'Islande, 1897.
- Vieilles histoires du pays breton, 1897
- Le Gardien du feu, novel, 1900.
- Le Sang de la sirène ("The Blood of the Siren"), 1901.
- La Légende de la mort chez les Bretons armoricains, revised and expanded as La légende de la mort en Basse-Bretagne, 1902.
- Cognomerus et sainte Trefine. Mystère breton en deux journées, text and translation, 1904
- Contes du soleil et de la brume, 1905.
- Ames d'Occident, 1911.
- Poèmes votifs, 1926.
- Introduction, Bretagne. Les Guides bleus (Paris: Hachette, 1949)
- La Bretagne. Choix de texte précédés d'une étude (Rennes: Éditions La Recouvrance, 1995)
