= Pauline Campanelli =

American painter

- Born: Pauline Eblé; January 25, 1943; The Bronx, New York
- Died: November 29, 2001 (aged 58); Pohatcong Township, New Jersey
- Occupations: artist, writer
- Years active: 1968-2001

Pauline Campanelli, née Eblé (1943–2001) was an American artist who specialized in photorealistic still lifes. Though her work did not often attract prestigious galleries or museums, only Andrew Wyeth sold more paintings while living than she did. Her top selling print, “Rose Berries” sold almost one million copies. In addition to painting, she wrote books on ancient pre-Christian rituals.

== Biography ==
Pauline Eblé was born on January 25, 1943, in The Bronx, New York. At the age of 3 she contracted polio, spending a year in an iron lung and another year and a half in a hospital. She was home schooled with college texts until she was aged 13 and then attended high school in Ridgewood, New Jersey. After graduating, she attended the Ridgewood School of Art and the Art Students League of New York.

Campanelli's style was known as superrealism or photorealism and she was most known for her still lifes of ordinary objects found in nature like fossils, shells, bird's nests and the like. She was influenced by Piet Mondrian as well as naturalism and her belief in paganism. She was a meticulous painter, who strove to complete minute details accurately. Early in her career, she produced nearly twenty paintings per year, but after 1990, six per year was her average. Even so, she sold more paintings as a living artist than any painter except Andrew Wyeth and her top-selling print, Wild Rose Berries, sold almost one million copies.

In 1969, Eblé married fellow painter Dan Campanelli and they made their living from teaching art classes and selling paintings. In 1976, they bought a stone farmhouse in New Jersey which was abandoned and had no electricity. As they were unable to obtain financing and had no savings, they restored the building themselves with hand tools. Eblé-Campanelli abandoned her wheelchair for hands and knees and refinished the floors, while Dan worked on the sagging structure. They pressed grapes in an antique fruit press, making their own wine; Eblé-Campanelli canned 400 jars of fruit annually; and she spun fleece from their Dorset sheep into yarn for projects. Their work and home was featured in Colonial Homes in the March/April 1981 issue and Country Living Magazine in April 1985. That same year, the New Jersey Network produced a PBS program on their artwork and life for television.

Both Eblé-Campanelli and her husband studied witchcraft and pre-Christian rituals to understand ancient practices and bring an appreciation to their rustic life. She researched and wrote books, publishing her first volume, Wheel of the Year: Living the Magical Life in 1989. Her most popular book, Ancient Ways: Reclaiming Pagan Traditions (1991) sold more than 40,000 copies.

Campanelli died November 29, 2001, at her home near Phillipsburg, in Pohatcong Township, New Jersey, from complications of her polio.

== Selected works ==
- Wheel of the year: living the magical life St. Paul, Minnesota: Llewellyn Publications (1989)
- Ancient ways: reclaiming pagan traditions St. Paul, Minnesota: Llewellyn Publications (1991)
- Rites of passage: the Pagan wheel of life St. Paul, Minnesota: Llewellyn Publications (1994)
- (with Dan Capanelli) The art of Pauline & Dan Campanelli Greenwich, Connecticut: New York Graphic Society (1995)
- (with Dan Capanelli) Holiday collectables: a price guide Gas City, Indiana: L-W Books, (1997)
- Pagan rites of passage St. Paul, Minnesota: Llewellyn Publications (1998)
