= Don Miguel Ruiz =

Mexican philosopher (born 1952)

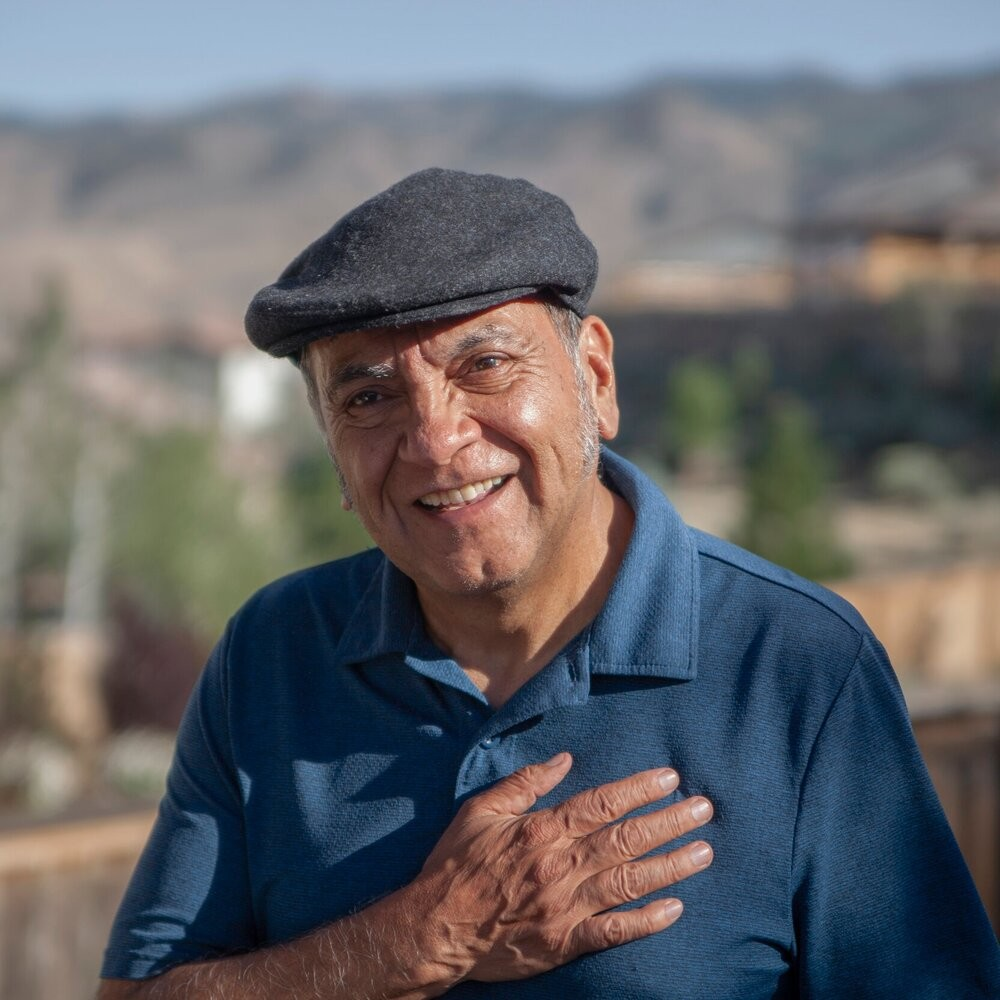
- Don Miguel Ruiz, 2011
- Born: August 27, 1952 (age 74); Tijuana, Baja California, Mexico
- Writing career
- Pen name: Don Miguel Ruiz
- Genres: Personal growth, self help
- Subject: Motivational
- Notable works: The Four Agreements, The Mastery of Love, The Voice of Knowledge, The Fifth Agreement
- Website: miguelruiz.com

Miguel Ángel Ruiz Macías (born August 27, 1952), better known as Don Miguel Ruiz, is a Mexican author of Toltec spiritual and personal development texts.

His work is best-received among members of the New Thought movement that focuses on ancient teachings as a means to achieve spiritual enlightenment. Ruiz is listed as one of the Watkins 100 Most Spiritually Influential Living People in 2018. Some have associated Ruiz's work with Carlos Castaneda, author of The Teachings of Don Juan.

== Biography ==
Miguel Ángel Ruiz Macías was born in Tijuana, Baja California, the youngest of 13 children. He attended medical school, and became a surgeon.

The Four Agreements, published in 1997, was a New York Times bestseller for more than a decade. Other books have followed: The Mastery of Love, The Voice of Knowledge, The Circle of Fire, The Four Agreements Companion Book and The Fifth Agreement, a collaboration with his son Don José. His The Toltec Art of Life and Death was published in late 2015.

== Works ==
- The Four Agreements: A Practical Guide to Personal Freedom (A Toltec Wisdom Book), 1997, co-authored with Janet Mills, published by Amber-Allen Publishing, ISBN 978-1-878424-31-0
- ‘’Beyond Fear: A Toltec Guide to Freedom and Joy, (The Teachings of Don Miguel Ruiz)’’, 1997, Council Oak Books, ISBN 978-1571780386
- The Mastery of Love: A Practical Guide to the Art of Relationship (A Toltec Wisdom Book), 1999, co-authored with Janet Mills, published by Amber-Allen Publishing, ISBN 978-1-878424-42-6
- The Four Agreements Companion Book: Using The Four Agreements to Master the Dream of Your Life (A Toltec Wisdom Book), 2000, co-authored with Janet Mills, published by Amber-Allen Publishing, ISBN 978-1-878424-48-8
- The Circle of Fire (Toltec Wisdom), 2001, co-authored with Janet Mills, published by Amber-Allen Publishing, ISBN 978-1-878424-52-5
- Wisdom from the Four Agreements (Charming Petites), 2003, Peter Pauper Press, ISBN 0-88088-990-X
- Wisdom from the Mastery of Love (Charming Petites), 2003, Peter Pauper Press, ISBN 0-88088-425-8
- The Voice of Knowledge: A Practical Guide To Inner Peace, 2004, co-authored with Janet Mills, published by Amber-Allen Publishing, ISBN 978-1-878424-54-9
- The Fifth Agreement: A Practical Guide to Self-Mastery, 2010, co-authored with Janet Mills, published by Amber-Allen Publishing, ISBN 978-1-878424-68-6
- The Toltec Art of Life and Death: A Story of Discovery, 2015, HarperCollins, ISBN 978-0-00-814796-9
- The Three Questions, 2018, HarperCollins, ISBN 978-0-06-239109-4
