= Brendan Myers =

Canadian philosopher and author (1974–2026)

- Born: 4 July 1974; Elora, Ontario, Canada
- Died: 13 August 2026 (aged 52); Ottawa, Ontario, Canada
- Occupations: Author, lecturer
- Website: brendanmyers.net

Brendan Patrick Myers (4 July 1974 – 13 August 2026) was a Canadian philosopher and author known for his contributions in environmental philosophy, Druidry and Neo-Druidism, mythology, and applied virtue ethics.

== Early life and education ==
Born on 4 July 1974 in Guelph, Ontario, Canada, the eldest son of an Irish-Canadian family, Myers was raised in Elora, Ontario. He earned a bachelor's degree in drama and philosophy and a master's degree in philosophy from the University of Guelph.

Myers completed doctoral studies in 2005 at NUI Galway with a dissertation entitled "Time and the Land: Four Approaches to Environmental Ethics, Climate Change, and Future Generations".

== Academic career ==
Myers worked as a contract researcher on Aboriginal affairs for the Government of Canada and taught at the University of Guelph, McMaster University, and other Canadian institutions before becoming a professor of philosophy at CÉGEP Heritage College.

== Pagan activism ==
While at university, Myers converted from Catholicism to paganism, becoming an activist member of the neo-pagan community. In 2026, he said that as a Druid, "I've favoured causes that seemed to me both important and also summoned by the call of the immensity: environmental protection, feminism, labour and working class activism."

In 2008 he was awarded the Mount Haemus Award for research in Druidry, from the OBOD in association with Salisbury Cathedral.

== Philosophy and influence ==
Myers published extensively on philosophy, environmental ethics and neopaganism from a Druidic perspective, examining ideas regarding the interconnectedness of creation and emphasizing the importance of strong moral character as vital to the health and well-being of the world and society. He introduced the concept of "Sacred Truth" and wrote on "global animism". His works have been widely cited in neopaganism.

He also wrote many fantasy and science fiction novels, for many years self-published under the imprint of Northwest Passage Books.

== Personal life and death ==
Myers died in Ottawa from complications following a heart attack on 13 August 2026, at the age of 52.

== Published works ==
=== Non-fiction ===
- Dangerous Religion: Environmental Spirituality And Its Activist Dimension (2004). El Sobrante, California: Dubsar House/Earth Religion Press. ISBN 1-59405-511-4.
- The Mysteries of Druidry: Celtic Mysticism, Theory, and Practice (2006). Franklin Lakes, New Jersey: New Page Books. ISBN 1-56414-878-5.
- The Other Side of Virtue: Where Our Virtues Really Came from, What They Really Mean, and Where They Might Be Taking Us (2008). Ropley, Hampshire: O Books. ISBN 978-1-84694-115-3.
- A Pagan Testament: The Literary Heritage of the World's Oldest New Religion, (2008). Ropley, Hampshire: O Books. ISBN 1-84694-129-6.
- Loneliness and Revelation: A Study of the Sacred Part One, (2010). Ropley, Hampshire: O Books. ISBN 978-1-84694-355-3.
- Circles of Meaning, Labyrinths of Fear: The 22 Relationships of a Spiritual Life and Culture -- And Why They Need Protection. (2012). Moon Books. ISBN 978-1-84694-745-2
- With Charlene Elsby and Alex Zieba. Clear and Present Thinking: A Handbook in Logic and Rationality (2013; 2nd ed., 2019). Northwest Passage Books. ISBN 978-0-99395-279-1
- Time and the Land: Four Approaches to Environmental Ethics, Climate Change, and Future Generations (2013; republication of doctoral dissertation). Northwest Passage Books. ISBN 978-0-99200-592-4
- The Earth, the Gods, and the Soul: A History of Pagan Philosophy from the Iron Age to the 21st Century. (2013). Moon Books/John Hunt Publishing. ISBN 978-1-78099-318-8
- Reclaiming Civilization: A Case for Optimism for the Future of Humanity. (2017). Moon Books/John Hunt Publishing. ISBN 978-1-78535-565-3
- The Circle Of Life Is Broken: An Eco-Spiritual Philosophy of the Climate Crisis. (2022). Moon Books/John Hunt Publishing.

=== Fiction ===
- Clan Fianna (2014). Northwest Passage Books. ISBN 978-0-99395-270-8
- A Trick of the Light (2014). Northwest Passage Books. ISBN 978-0-99395-271-5
- The Seekers (2014). Northwest Passage Books. ISBN 978-0-99200-598-6
- Flight of the Siren (2020). Northwest Passage Books. ISBN 978-1-99911-462-6
- The Book of Urania(2021). Arcana Elements. ISBN 978-1-99939-549-0
- Éiruna (2023). Arcana Elements ISBN 978-1-7778589-2-6
- Whisperlights (2025). Arcana Elements. ISBN 978-1-77785-895-7
- The Way of Wind and Rain (2026). Arcana Elements. ISBN 978-1-77785-898-8

==== Fellwater: The Hidden Houses ====
- Fellwater (2012). Northwest Passage Books. ISBN 978-0-99200-597-9
- Hallowstone (2012). Northwest Passage Books. ISBN 978-0-99200-599-3
- Clan Fianna (2014). Northwest Passage Books. ISBN 978-0-99395-270-8
- Elderdown (2015). Northwest Passage Books. ISBN 978-0-99395-272-2

=== Game ===
- Iron Age - Council of the Clans: A strategy game of power, honour, and democracy (2012)

== See also ==
- Neo-druidism
- Virtue ethics
