= Jean Le Fustec =

Jean Le Fustec (10 May 1855, in Rostrenen – 22 March 1910, in Paris) was a Breton bard, and the first Archdruid of the Goursez Vreizh (Gorsedd of Brittany). He is also known by his Breton language name Yann ab Gwilherm and his Druidic name Lemenik.

Le Fustec was born in Rostrenen. His father Guillaume Le Fustec was a Huissier de justice (bailiff). His mother was Catherine Le Bars.

He became a journalist at the French illustrated newspaper Le Magasin pittoresque, and later in various Parisian newspapers. In Paris, he joined the Breton Regionalist Union.

In 1899, he and Erwan Berthou founded the Gorsedd of Brittany, which sought to link Brittany to international pan-Celticism, and to direct the regionalist movement and recreate distinct Breton identity.

He was Archdruid of the Gorsedd of Brittany from 1901 to 1903, after which Berthou took over the position.

In 1906 Le Fustec and Erwan Berthou published Eur to gir of rear Varzed, Triades des druides de Bretagne, a translation into Breton of the 46 theological Triads of the neo-Bards, according to a text first published by Iolo Morganwg with his own Lyric Poems, then in the Barddas of J. William ab Ithel (1862). The collection, in fact a forgery by Morganwg, was claimed to have been a translation of works by Llywelyn Siôn detailing the history of the Welsh bardic system from its ancient origins to the present day.
