= Gwenc'hlan Le Scouëzec =

Breton doctor, writer and druid (1929–2008)

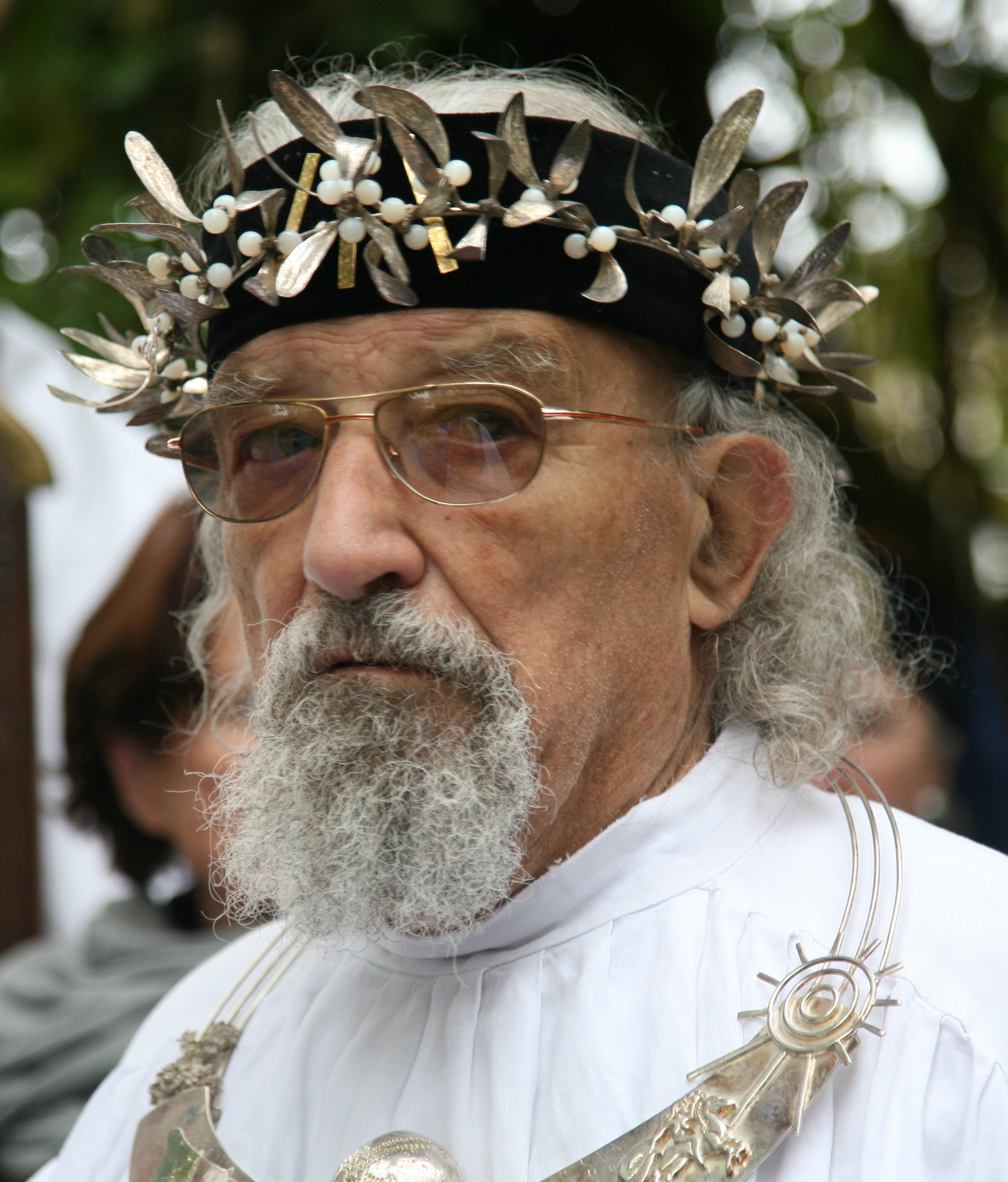
- Archdruid Gwenc'hlan Le Scouëzec 2007
- Born: 11 November 1929; Plouescat, Finistère
- Died: 6 February 2008 (aged 78)
- Education: La Sorbonne
- Occupations: Writer and Grand Druid of Brittany
- Relatives: Maurice Le Scouëzec
- Writing career
- Notable work: L’Encyclopédie de la divination
- Movement: Bleimor

Loïc Gwenc'hlan Le Scouëzec (11 November 1929, Plouescat, Finistère – 6 February 2008) was a Breton medical doctor, writer, and Grand Druid of Brittany.

== Biography ==
Gwenc’hlan was born in Brittany, France. His father was Maurice Le Scouëzec, a painter. Gwenc’hlan spent most of his childhood in Madagascar, Paris, Landivisiau and Douarnenez, before doing his secondary studies in Saint-Vincent de Pont-Croix, Saint-Yves de Quimper and Saint-Grégoire de Tours, in 1942. There, he took part in the Breton Scouts movement Bleimor. He pursued higher studies in history at La Sorbonne in Paris.

He did military service between 1951 and 1953 in the French Foreign Legion at Sidi-bel-Abbès and Daya in Algeria. He was a teacher of French in Crete and Athens from 1953 until 1957, when he was recalled to the French Foreign Legion at the 5th Foreign Regiment. After his military service ended in 1958, he became a professor at the French Institute of Athens, as well as in Saint-Didier-en-Velay in Versailles.

As of 1960, he started to study medicine, and completed this with distinction in the Faculty of Medicine of Paris. He worked as a doctor at Quimper from 1969 until 1985. He also initiated Skoazell Vreizh, the Breton emergency service, together with Xavier Grall and Yann Choucq in the 1970s. He was a participant of the "Colloque Bretagne" in 1973. He wrote the preface in Morvan Lebesque's book Comment peut-on être Breton? (How can we be Breton?). In 1985, he founded the publishing business Beltan. He promoted the work of his father, the painter Maurice Le Scouëzec.

== Neo-Druidism ==
He became Deputy Grand Druid within the "Poellgor" (executive committee of the Gorsedd) on 1 April 1979, then he became the Grand Druid of Brittany, succeeding Per Loisel, on 1 November 1980. The association Goursez Vreizh (Gorsedd of Brittany), also known as "Breudeuriezh Drouized, Barzhed hag Ovizion Breizh" in Breton or "Fraternité des druides, bardes et ovates de Bretagne" in French (Fraternity of the Druids, Bards and Ovates of Brittany), represents neo-druidism most regularly.

Gwenc’hlan is the fifth Grand Druid of our time, according to the Gorsedd de Bretagne. In November 1993 he united a group of Freemasons, forming the "loge maçonnique de la pierre"(freemason lodge of the stone), to preserve the masonic forest rites.

== Bibliography ==
- L’Encyclopédie de la divination (edited by René Alleau). Tchou, 1963.
- Guide de la Bretagne mystérieuse (1966, re-released under the title Le Guide de la Bretagne). Tchou, 1966.
- La Bretagne (Brittany). Sun, 1967.
- Histoire du Mouvement breton, Que sais-je?. 1971
- Bretagne terre sacrée (Brittany: Sacred Land) 1977
- La Médecine en Gaule (Medicine in Gaule) Guipavas, Ed. Kelenn. 1976
- Brasparts: une paroisse des monts d’Arrée. Le Seuil, 1980.
- Le peintre Le Scouëzec, Brasparts, Alrea, 1984.
- Maurice Le Scouëzec, L’aventure de peindre, Brasparts, Beltan, 1993.
- Le peintre Le Scouëzec, mon père, Brasparts, Beltan, 1995.
- Le Scouëzec, 1881–1940: Montparnasse, la Bretagne, l'Afrique. Cénomane, 1998.
- Dictionnaire de la Tradition Bretonne, Paris, Editions du Félin, Philippe Lebaud, 1999.
- Guide des calvaires bretons, Spezet, Coop Breizh, 1999.
- Itinéraire spirituel en Bretagne, Paris, La Table Ronde, 2000.
- La tradition des druides, trois tomes, Beltan, 2001.
- Le grand druide était innocent. Editions Beltan. (François Taldir-Jaffrenou)
- Arthur, roi des bretons d'Armorique, Le Manoir du Tertre.

== In collaboration with Jean-Robert Masson ==
- Pierres sacrées de Bretagne : calvaires et enclos paroissiaux (1982)
- Pierres sacrées de Bretagne: croix et sanctuaires (1983)
- Bretagne mégalithique (1987)
- Enez Eusa, Ouessant mystérieux (avec Maï-Sous Robert-Dantec). Quimper : Élisart Éditeur, 2001.
- Entretiens avec un druide nommé Gwenc'hlan (de Régis Blanchet aux Editions Du Prieuré) (1993).
