= List of works by Jean Boucher =

Jean Boucher
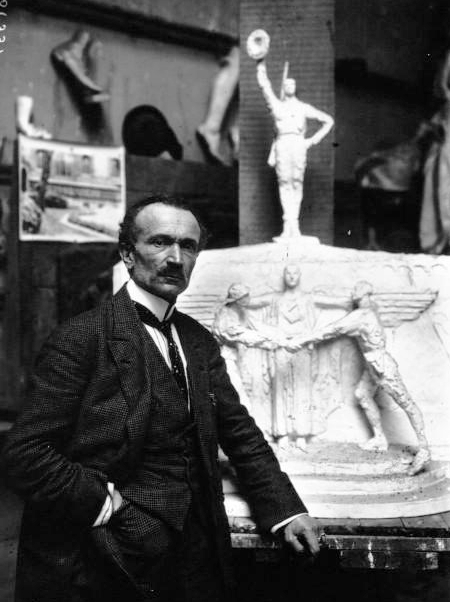
- Born: Jean Marie Théodore Joseph Boucher. 1869; Rennes
- Died: 1939 (aged 69–70); Paris
- Occupation: Sculptor

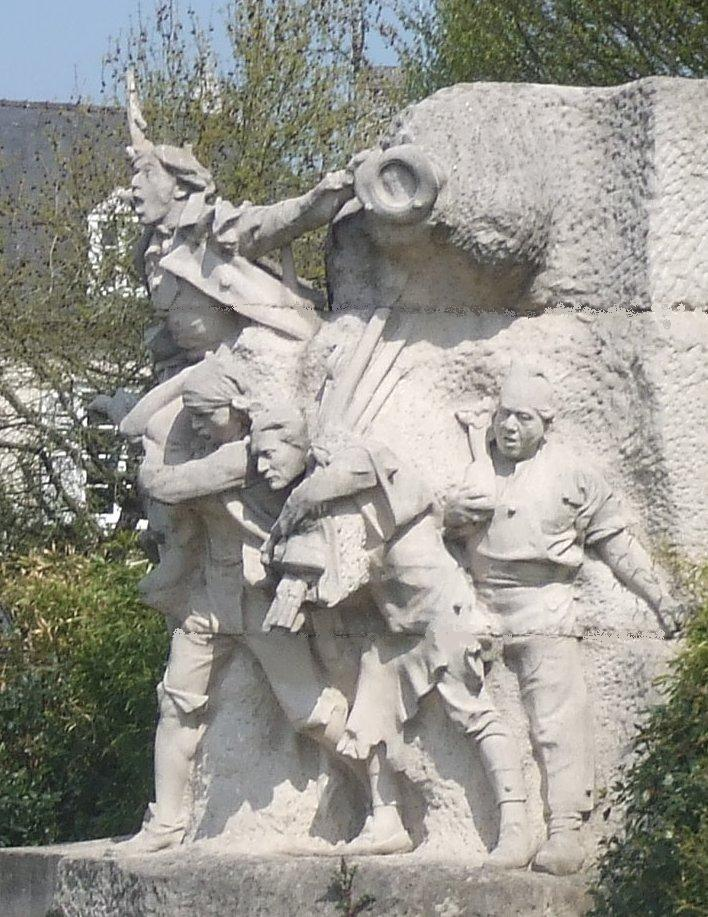
Boucher's sculpture depicting Camille Desmoulins leading the Storming of the Bastille

This is a listing of the main works of Jean Boucher, who was a French sculptor born in Cesson-Sévigné on 20 November 1870. He died in Paris in 1939 and is buried in Rennes alongside his son.

== Early works ==
After completing his primary education and when he was twelve years of age, Boucher was apprenticed to a Rennes blacksmith but his artistic abilities came to the notice of the sculptor Charles Joseph Lenoir, the father of Pierre Charles Lenoir, who advised him to attend evening classes at the "Halle aux Toiles" in Rouen. There he became a friend of the painter Jules Ronsin who was to become a director of the Ếcole Régionale des Beaux-arts in Rennes, a school which was to produce a generation of talented sculptors who became known as the "Ếcole de Rennes" and apart from Boucher included Paul Le Goff, Louis Henri Nicot, Pierre Charles Lenoir, Eloi Robert, Albert Bourget, Armel Beaufils and Francis Renaud. 1888 was to be an important year for Boucher and he enrolled at the École nationale supérieure des Beaux-Arts in Paris, helped by a bursary from the Rennes municipality. On arriving in Paris he shared rooms with Ronsin and his apprenticeship started at the Académie Julian where he was able to learn from Henri Chapu and by the end of 1889 he was able to join the Ếcole des beaux-arts itself and was placed in the studio of Alexandre Falguière and was able to attend classes run by Antonin Mercié. Boucher now worked on preparing suitable works to submit to the salons and enter into competitions. 1891 saw him win third medal in the competition entitled "Figure modelée d'après l'antique". 1896 saw Boucher's first showing at the Salon des Artistes français with a plaster version of "Un soir". Here are details of some of these early works.

=== "Âge d'or" ===
In 1893 he executed the composition "Âge d'or" and in that year won the "Lemaire" competition medal which allowed him to reduce the length of his obligatory military service which was due at that time. The present whereabouts of "Âge d'or" is not known.

=== "Achille revêt l'armure apportée à Thétis" ===
This plaster bas-relief is held in the Musée des Beaux-rts in Troyes. It had been Boucher's submission for the Prix de Rome in 1894. "Achille revêt l'armure apportée à Thétis" had been that year's set subject for those competing for the prize. Boucher was the runner-up, but by way of consolation did win the 1894 Chenavard prize.

=== "Un soir" ===
This marble composition was shown at the Salon des Artistes Français in 1899 and presented to Montauban in 1902, where it stands in the "Jardin des Plantes". Several versions of the piece were cast in bronze. The plaster version had appeared at the Salon des Artistes français in 1896.

=== "Caïn après la mort d'Abel" ===
In 1898, Boucher was again the runner-up for the Prix de Rome. "Caïn après la mort d'Abel" was that year's set subject. This was the year he left the Beaux-Arts having won the "Prix National" (see comments below for "Antique et moderne").

== Restoration of the west porch of the Dol-de-Bretagne cathedral ==
In 1898 Boucher received his first major commission when invited to participate in the restoration of Dol-de-Bretagne cathedral. He worked on some relief sculptures on the exterior of the cathedral's west porch. This work exposed Boucher to the technics of Gothic architects and craftsmen.

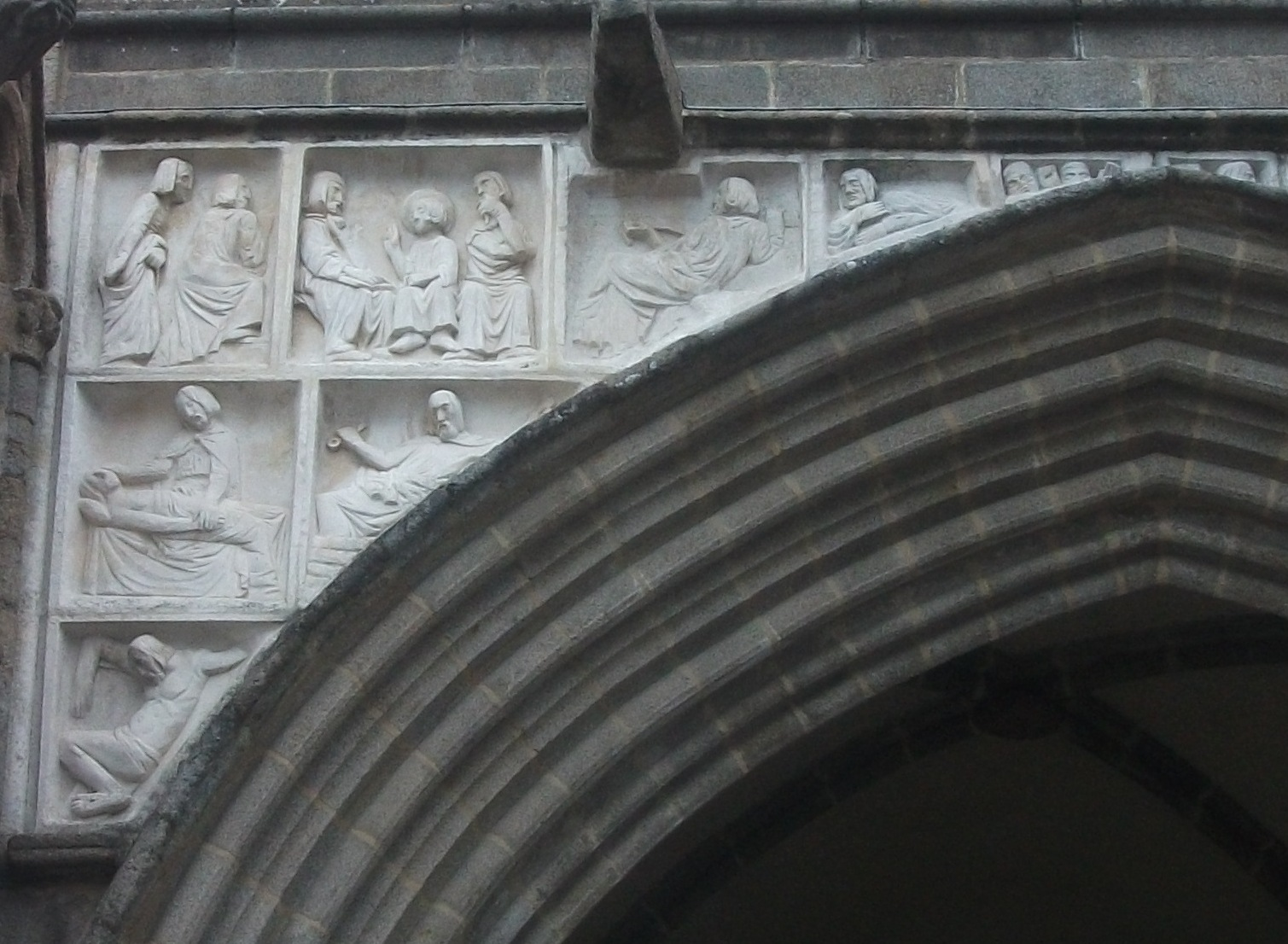
Relief sculpture on main door of Dol-de-Bretagne cathedral

=== "Antique et moderne" ===
This work in marble can now be seen in Cesson-Sévigné although for many years it was held in the Nantes' Musée des Beaux-Arts. This work won the "Prix National" in 1898 which came with a bursary to cover the expense of a period spent outside France studying sculpture including a year in Italy, something along the lines of the "Prix de Rome" but without the chance to study at the Académie de France/Villa Medici. Boucher left Paris on 1 September 1901, visiting museums and staying for periods in Belgium, Germany, England and Spain before reaching Italy. Boucher's composition features two people, one representing antiquity in the form of a philosopher seated in an armchair and the other modernity with a depiction of a young woman seated on the ground by the philosopher. Both are deep in thought. A plaster version was shown at the Salon des Artistes français in 1899 and in 1905 Boucher donated this to the Musée Joseph Denais in Beaufort-en-Vallée.

=== "Devant la Mer" ===
This marble work depicting a young couple was exhibited at the Salon des Artistes français in 1899. In 1934 it was shown at the Musée du Petit Palais and the following year placed in the Jardin des Tuileries. In 1959 Germaine Richier' s "L'échiquier" replaced Boucher's "Devant la Mer" and the latter's present whereabouts is not known.

=== "Eté" ===
In 1900 Boucher received the first class medal from the Salon des Artistes français for this plaster composition which featured a family scene; wife, husband and daughter. The present whereabouts of this work is not known.

His successes at this time with the Salon des Artistes français where he exhibited the work "Antique et Moderne" and others and his near successes with the Prix de Rome led to a bursary being granted in 1901 as part of the Prix National which allowed Boucher to travel overseas and he visited Belgium, Spain, Germany and Great Britain and finished in Italy where he was obliged under the terms of the bursary to study for one year.

== Subsequent works ==
=== Monument to Ernest Renan ===
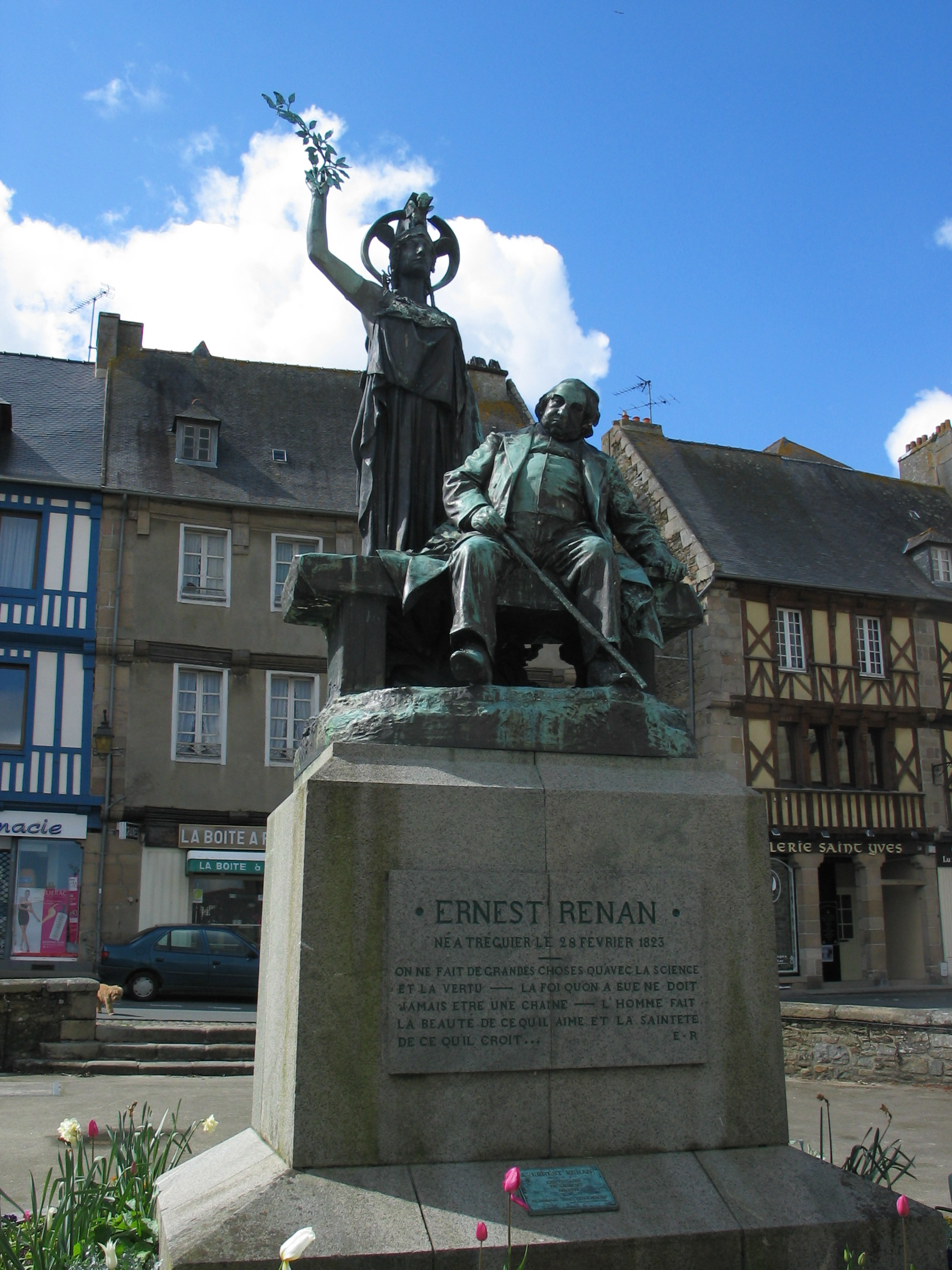
Ernest Renan monument in Tréguier

In 1903, Boucher, having returned to France from Italy, received the commission to work on the Ernest Renan monument in Tréguier. The statue was inaugurated in 1903 and sits in the place Matray and in front of Tréguier's cathedral. Renan is depicted next to Athena the Goddess of Reason and the symbol of Science and Wisdom. The work is in bronze, the casting being undertaken by the Malesset foundry. The plaque on the monument's base reads

"Ernest Renan / Né à Tréguier le 27 février 1823 / On ne fait de grandes choses qu’avec la science/ et la vertu. La foi qu’on a eue ne doit / jamais être une chapine. L’ homme fait la beauté dece qu’il aime et la sainteté / de ce qu’il croit... / E-R"

The erection of the monument was promoted in 1902 by "Les Bretons de Paris". Boucher was awarded the Légion d’honneur for this work.

=== Monument to Rivoire ===
Boucher's monument to André Rivoire can be seen in Vienne. Rivoire was a poet and playwright.

=== "Union de la Bretagne à la France" ===
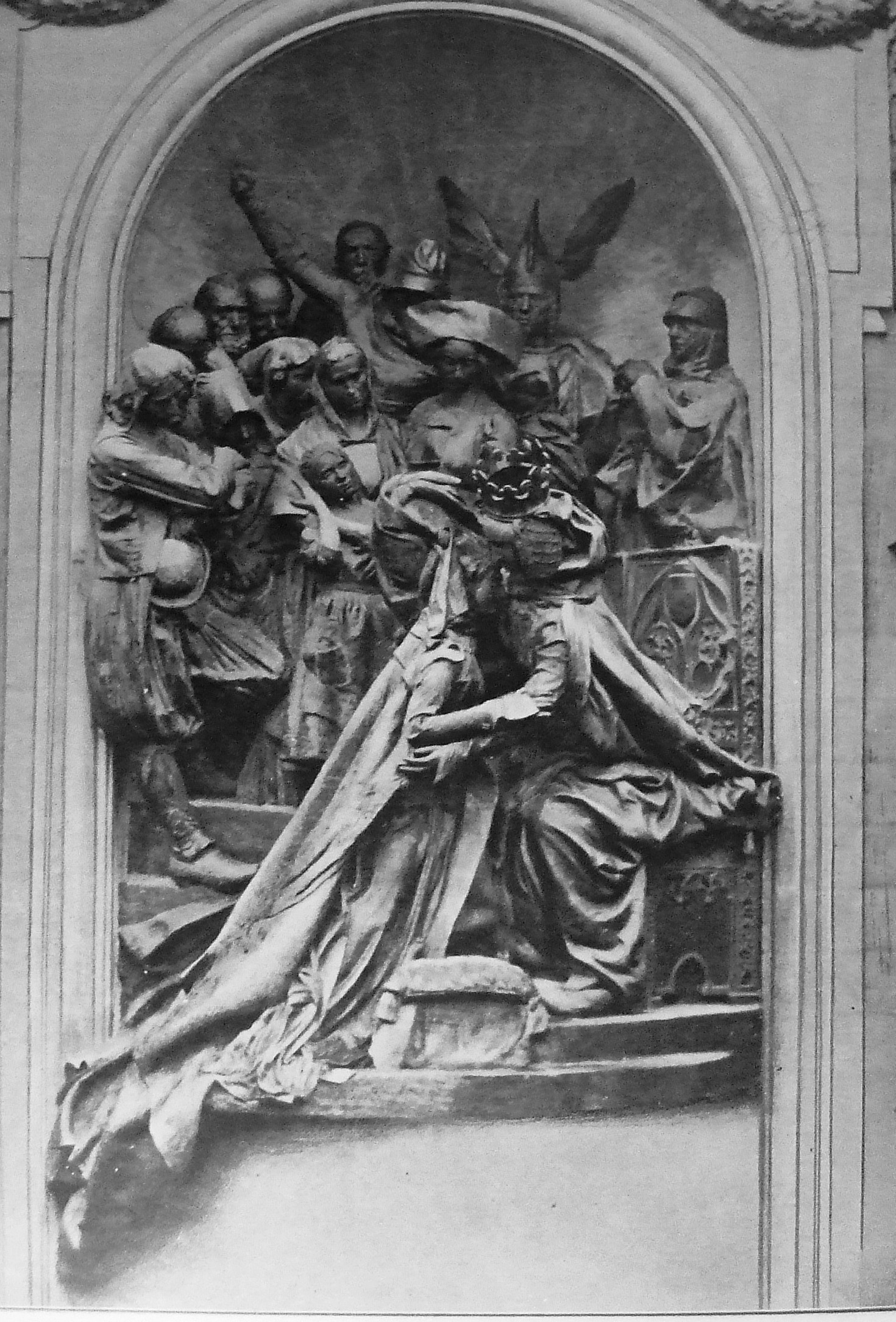
In 1911 Boucher created this relief placed in a niche of the Rennes hôtel de ville. It was dynamited by Breton separatists in 1932

This 1911 work was arguably one of Boucher's best works but the "Gwenn ha Du" group blew it up as a protest. It was never replaced but some of the fragments were used for subsequent monuments/memorials. See later details. The Rennes art museum for example hold a fragment entitled "Tête de bretonne".

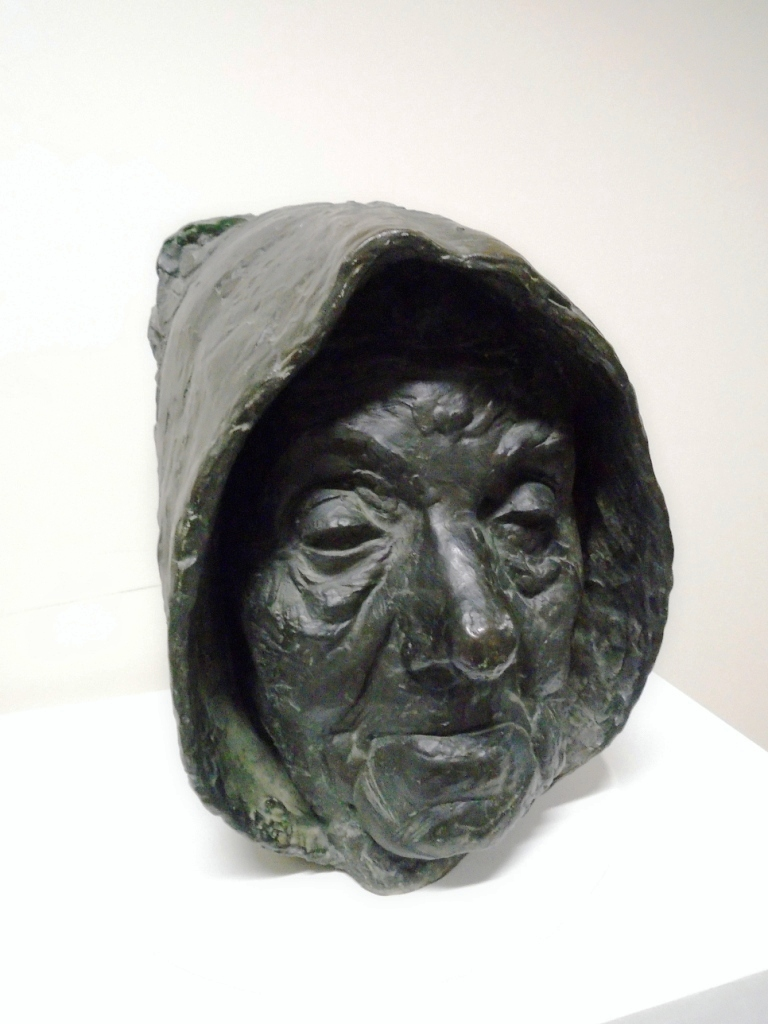
A fragment of the sculpture "Union de la Bretagne à la France" in the Rennes Art Museum

=== The work "Chinoise au brûle parfum" ===
Both the Musée des beaux-arts in Rennes and the Musée d'Orsay in Paris hold versions of this Boucher work which he worked on between 1911 and 1913. The association "Bretons de Paris" had organised for a monument to be erected in Brest dedicated to Dr Mesny. The work was in bronze and stood in Brest's place de La Tour d'Auvergne but in 1942 the work was requisitioned and the bronze melted down. However limited edition reductions had been cast in bronze and marketed under the titles "Oriental Priest" and "Oriental Fairy" and it is copies of these statuettes which the two museums hold. The work had been shown at the 1923 Exposition coloniale in Marseille. In 1979 the original plaster model came into the possession of the Musée de Rennes.

=== Bust of Charles Le Goffic ===
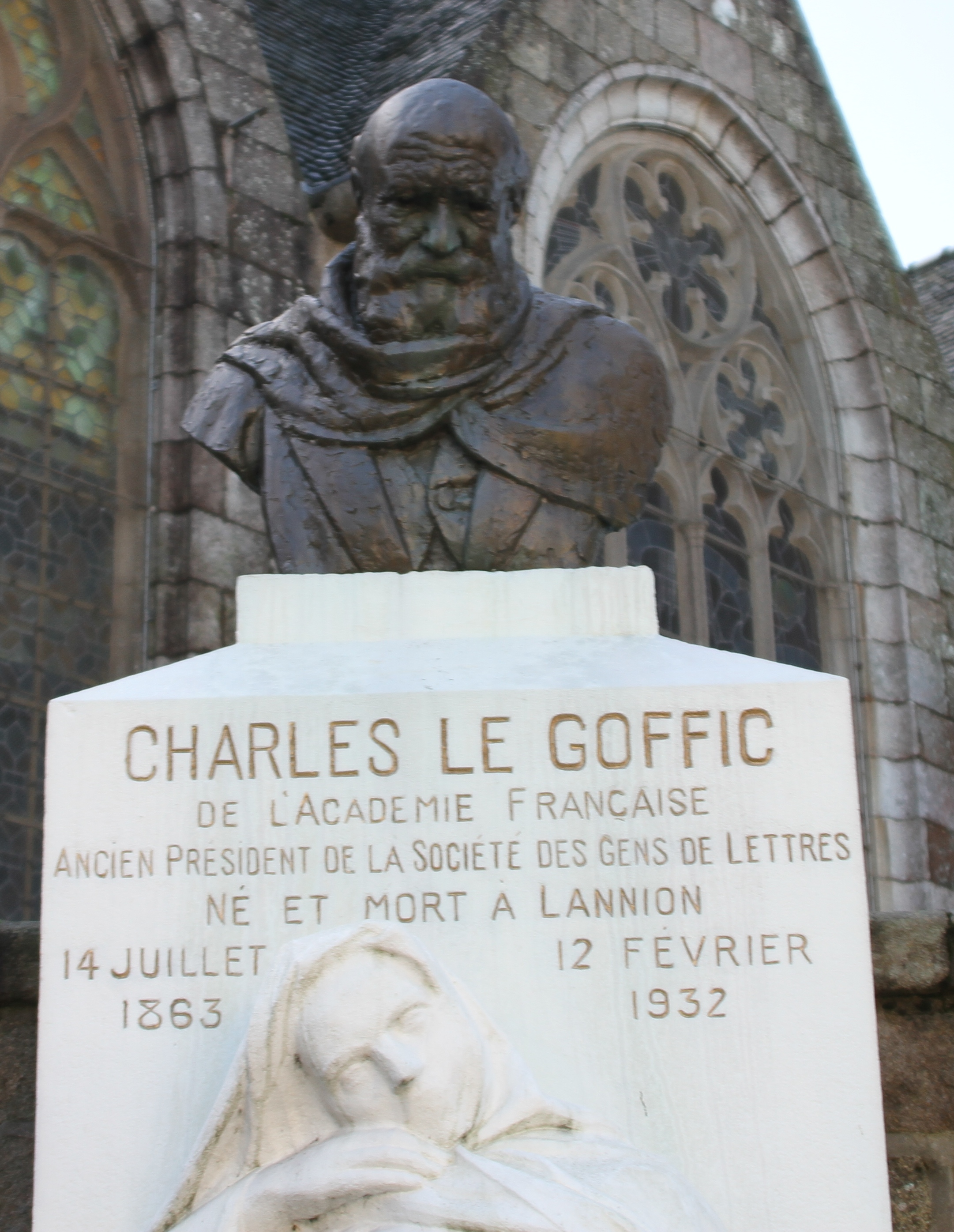
Bust of Charles Le Goffic in Lannion

This Boucher work can be seen in Lannion's place de l'Église Saint-Jean.

=== "La Maternité" ===
The "Manoir du Carfour" in La Bouëxière is today known as the "Centre médical Rey-Leroux" and in the nearby park is a work by Boucher entitled "La Maternité". This work has been identified as having been a part of the Rennes "La Réunion de la Bretagne à la France" blown up in 1932 by Breton separatists but others feel it was a preliminary study intended for the Rennes sculpture. The Musée municipal de Locronan have a plaster version of the work.

=== Monument to Armand Dayot ===
This 1937 Boucher work in Paimpol was another bronze confiscated and melted down in 1941. The inscription on the pedestal reads

" Armand Dayot / Inspecteur général / des Beaux-Arts et des Musées / Ecrivain Critique / Animateur / Fondateur de l’Art et les Artistes / Né à Paimpol le 19 octobre 1851 / Mort le 2 octobre 1934"

Jean-Julien Lemordant and "les Bleus de Bretagne" decided to honour Dayot who was born in Paimpol. After the war a replacement bust was erected but in stone not bronze.

=== Monument to Charles Baratoux ===
Boucher executed the bronze bust for this 1904 monument which is located in Saint-Brieuc. Baratoux had served as Saint Brieuc's mayor. In 1942 the bronze was requisitioned and melted down. In 1949 Elie Le Goff executed a replacement bust.

=== Monument to Edouard Le Mounier ===
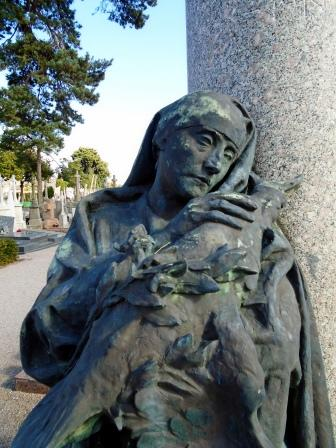
The tomb of Edouard Le Mounier

This monument was dedicated to the French aviator who died in 1918. It marks Le Mounier's tomb in the Cimetière Saint-Michel in Saint-Brieuc. Boucher's bust of Le Mounier sits on a column of pink marble and by this column is the sculpture a veiled woman in mourning, an allegory for France. She clasps a wounded bird in her arms.

=== Bust of the Comtesse de Ségur ===
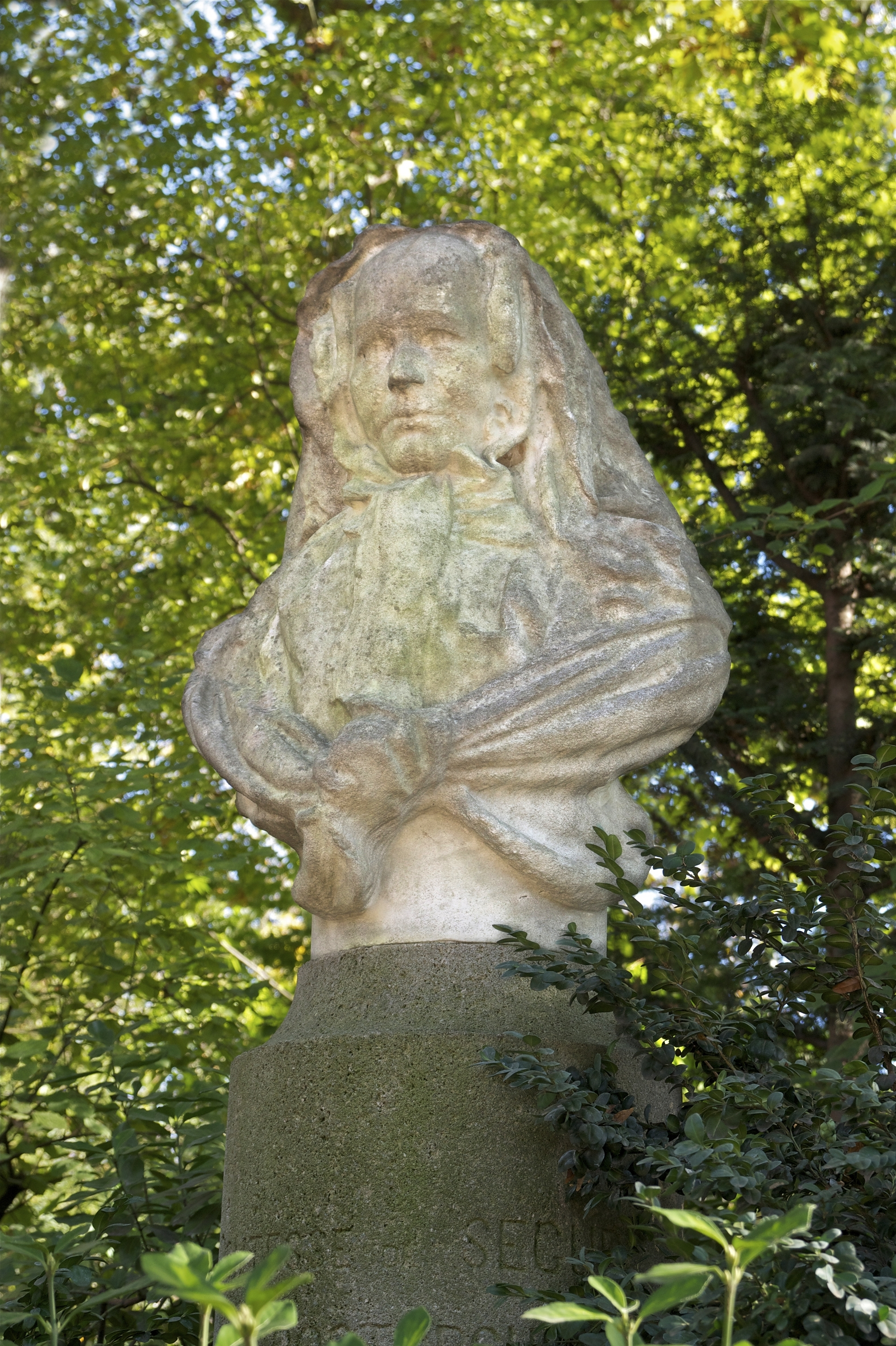
Bust of the comtesse de Ségur

This Boucher bust of the writer and Russian-born Countess dates to 1920 and can be seen in Paris' Jardin du Luxembourg.

=== Bust of Eugène Biraud ===
Biraud had set up the first cooperative milk factory in Brittany and Boucher was commissioned in 1932 to execute this bronze bust which stands in Surgères' avenue de la Gare.

=== Statue of Serpollet ===
Boucher's sculpture was unveiled in 1909. Léon Serpollet was a French industrialist and maker of steam automobiles under the "Gardner-Serpollet" brand. He also designed steam trams.

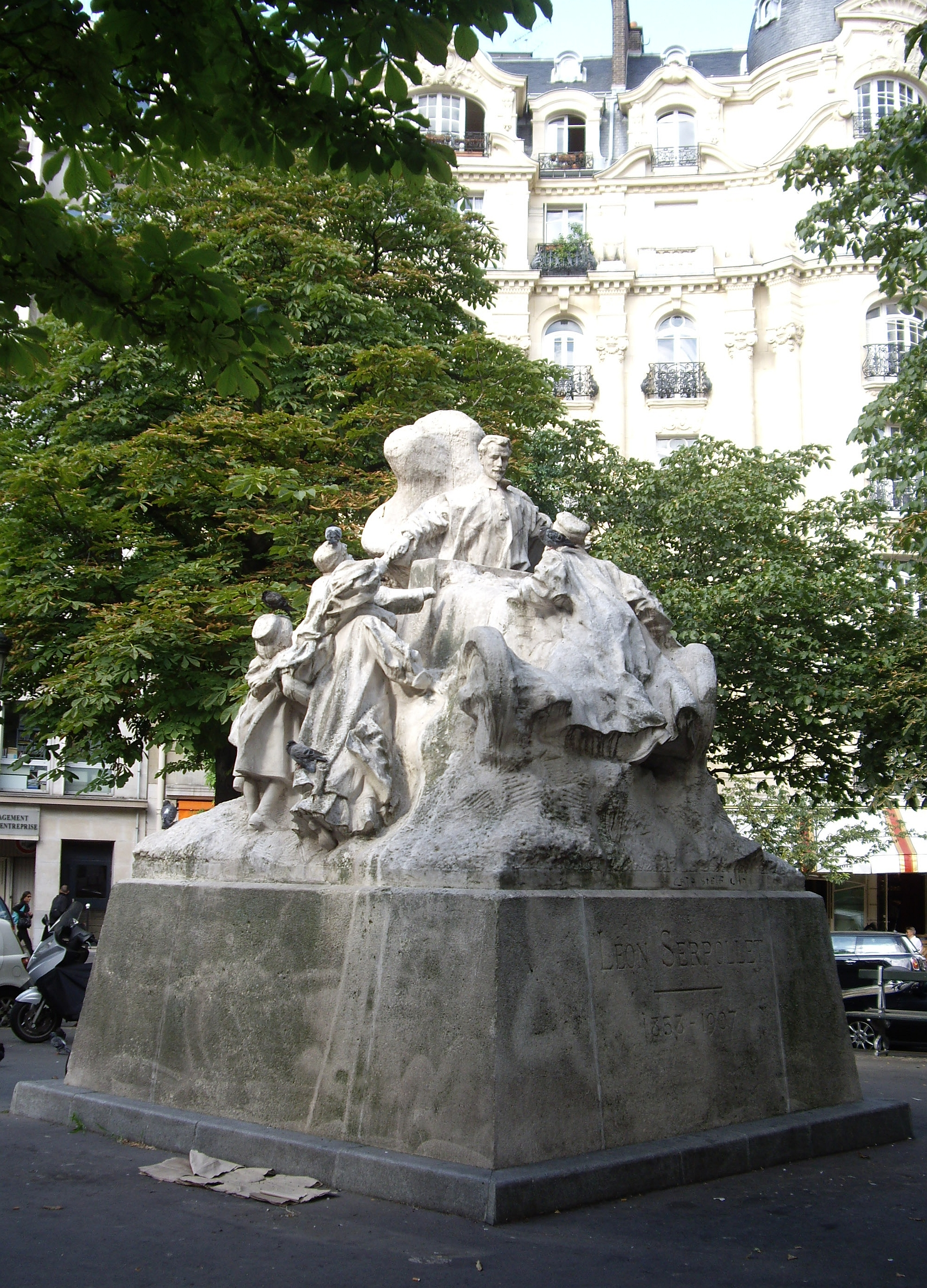
Statue of French industrialist Léon Serpollet

=== Monument à la Victoire et aux Soldats de Verdun ===
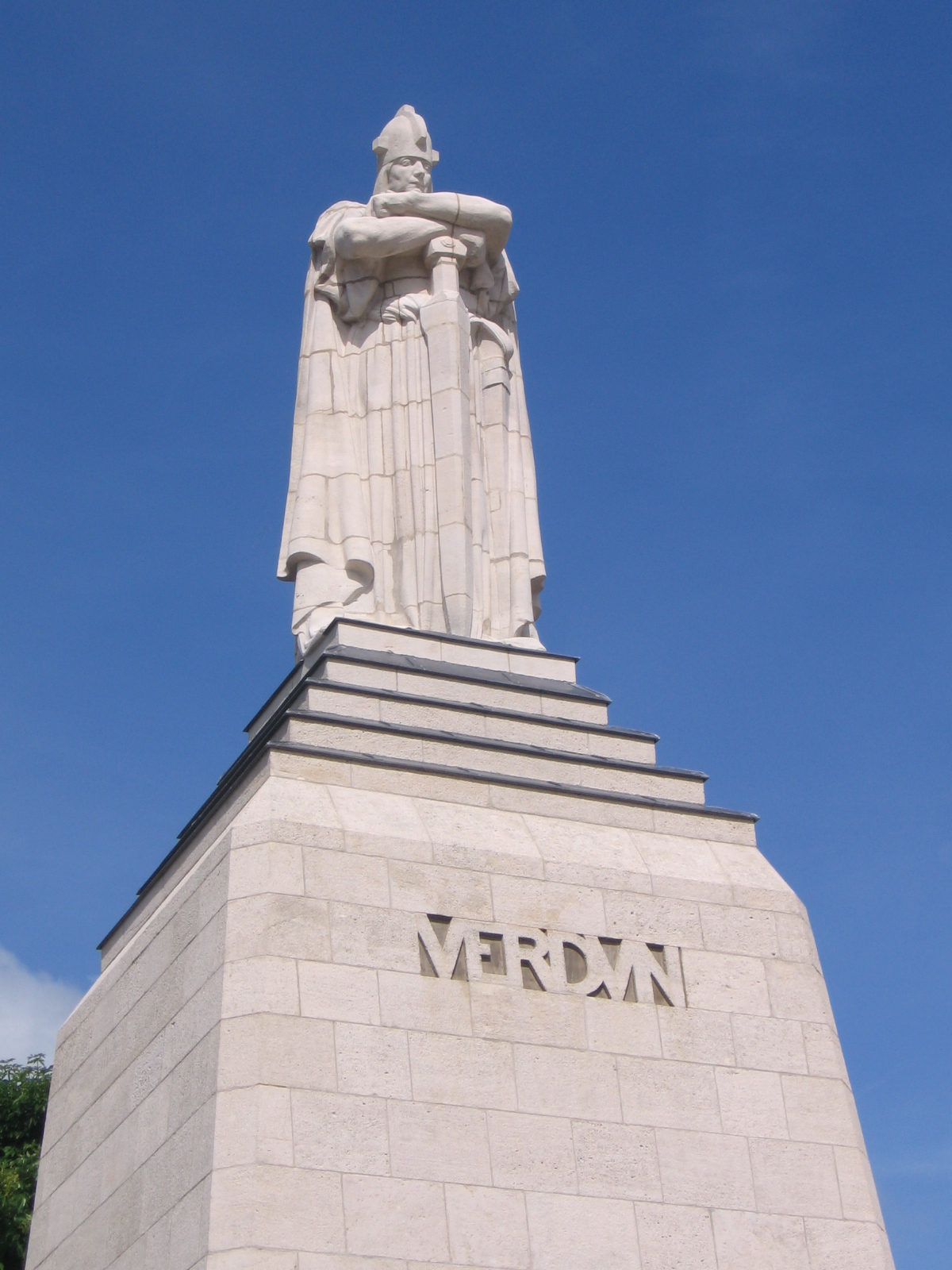
Boucher's sculpture of a French warrior on the "Monument à la Victoire et aux Soldats de Verdun"

This monument celebrating the victory at Verdun and the soldiers who fought there throughout 1914-1918 stands in Verdun's place de la Libération. Boucher worked on the monument with the architect Léon Chesnay. Building started in 1926. This monument is of huge dimensions and stands at the top of a 73 step staircase joining the rue Mazes with the place de la Liberation. Boucher's sculpture of a French warrior stands at the top of a pyramid shaped tower leaning on a massive sword and looking out towards the Verdun battlefields to the east. At the foot of the tower is a crypt into whose niches, records (les Livres d'Or) of the names of the French and American soldiers who fought on the Meuse were placed, although these records are now held in Verdun's mairie. Boucher had fought at Verdun and joining the Army as a sergeant he had been promoted to lieutenant and was awarded the Croix de Guerre. The inauguration took place on 23 June 1929 as part of various ceremonies in that year to mark the "renaissance" of Verdun after ten years of reconstruction. The ceremony was performed before a huge crowd with Gaston Doumergue, Raymond Poincaré and Marshal Philippe Pétain presiding. This monument is of enormous importance to the French nation with ceremonies organised by the "Comité de la Voie sacrée" and the "la Voie de la Liberté" and a torch lit procession each year on the 11 November from the flame of the Arc de Triomphe's tomb of the unknown soldier is taken to Verdun and relights the flame in the monument's crypt and other torches are taken to various war memorials throughout France (known as the "Flamme du Souvenir"). Below is a photograph of the plaque on the monument's base. On each side of the Boucher's sculpture are 152.4 mm Russian canons.

=== Study of Fra Angelico ===
Boucher executed the Fra Angelico sculpture in around 1913 and the Musée d'Orsay hold a version in marble. The founder Valsuani carried out various castings in bronze and Rudier did a bronze casting just of the head. Boucher won the Houllevigne prize with this work.

=== Monument to Maréchal Galliéni ===
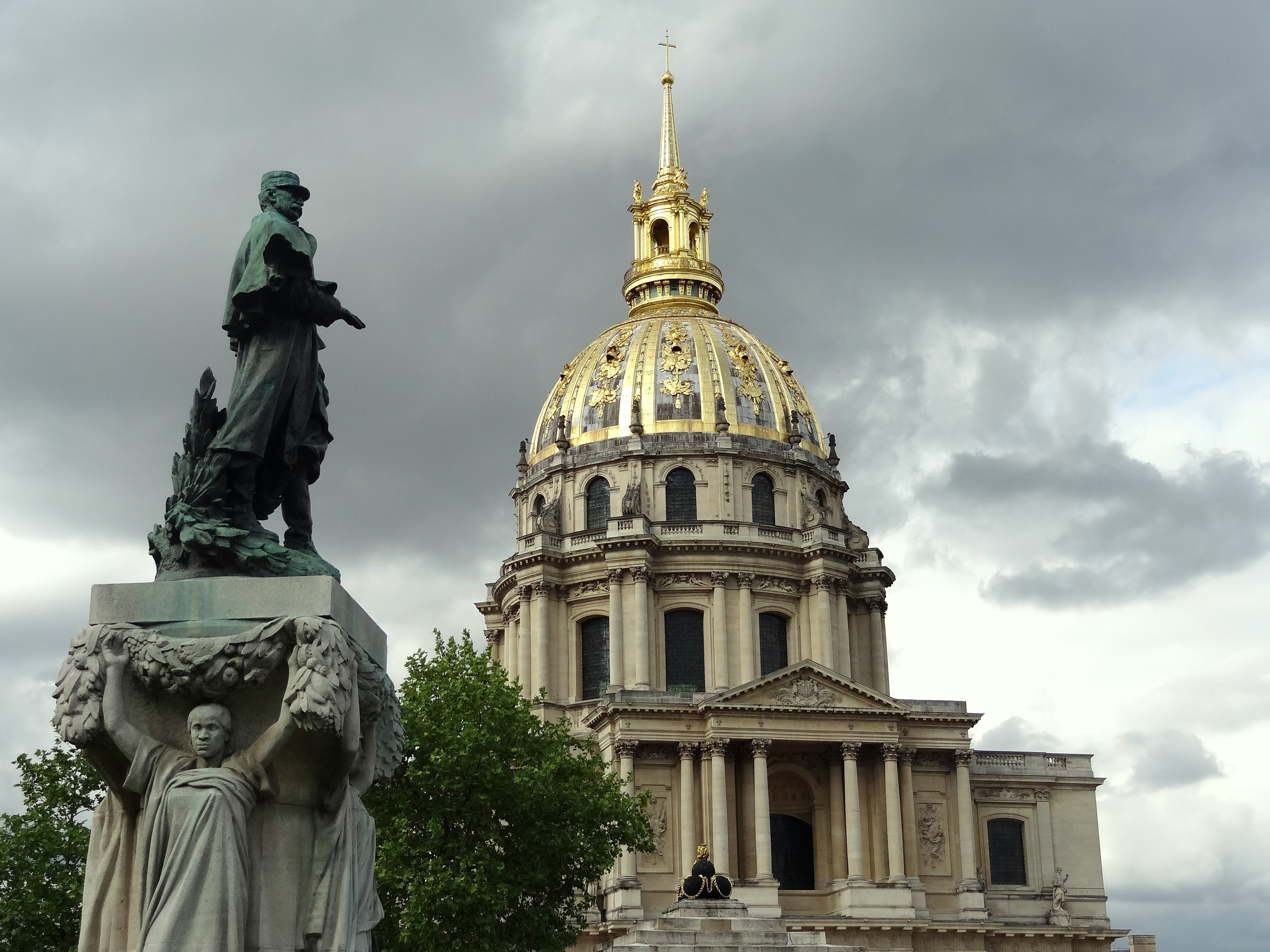
Monument to Maréchal Galliéni

This 1926 bronze sculpture by Boucher is located in Paris' Place Vauban. The figure of Galliéni stands on a Euville stone pedestal and is supported by four caryatids which are allegories for the major phases of Galliéni's life- The Sudan where he started his career, Tonkin where he fought Chinese rebels, Madagascar where he served as Governor and Paris which he helped defend in 1914. Originally the monument was erected on the esplanade des Invalides.

The inscription on the pedestal reads

"AU MARECHAL GALLIENI / LA VILLE DE PARIS / CE MONUMENT A ETE ERIGE A LA SUITE D’UNE SOUSCRIPTION PUBLIQUE ORGANISEE PAR / LA LIGUE MARITIME ET COLONIALE FRANCAISE"

It was in 1920 that a committee was formed to organise a monument to Galliéni and a subscription was organised. The initial commission went to the sculptor Bénet but his sculpture was considered as too modest for Paris and his work was erected in Trilbardour in 1924 facing the site of the Battle of the Ourcq. Boucher was now commissioned to produce a Galliéni sculpture and much thought then went into finding a suitable location, the Esplanade des Invalides being chosen and finally when the existing location was chosen to be the site of the 1937 Exposition internationale, the monument was moved to the place Vauban.

=== Monument to Émile Fayolle ===
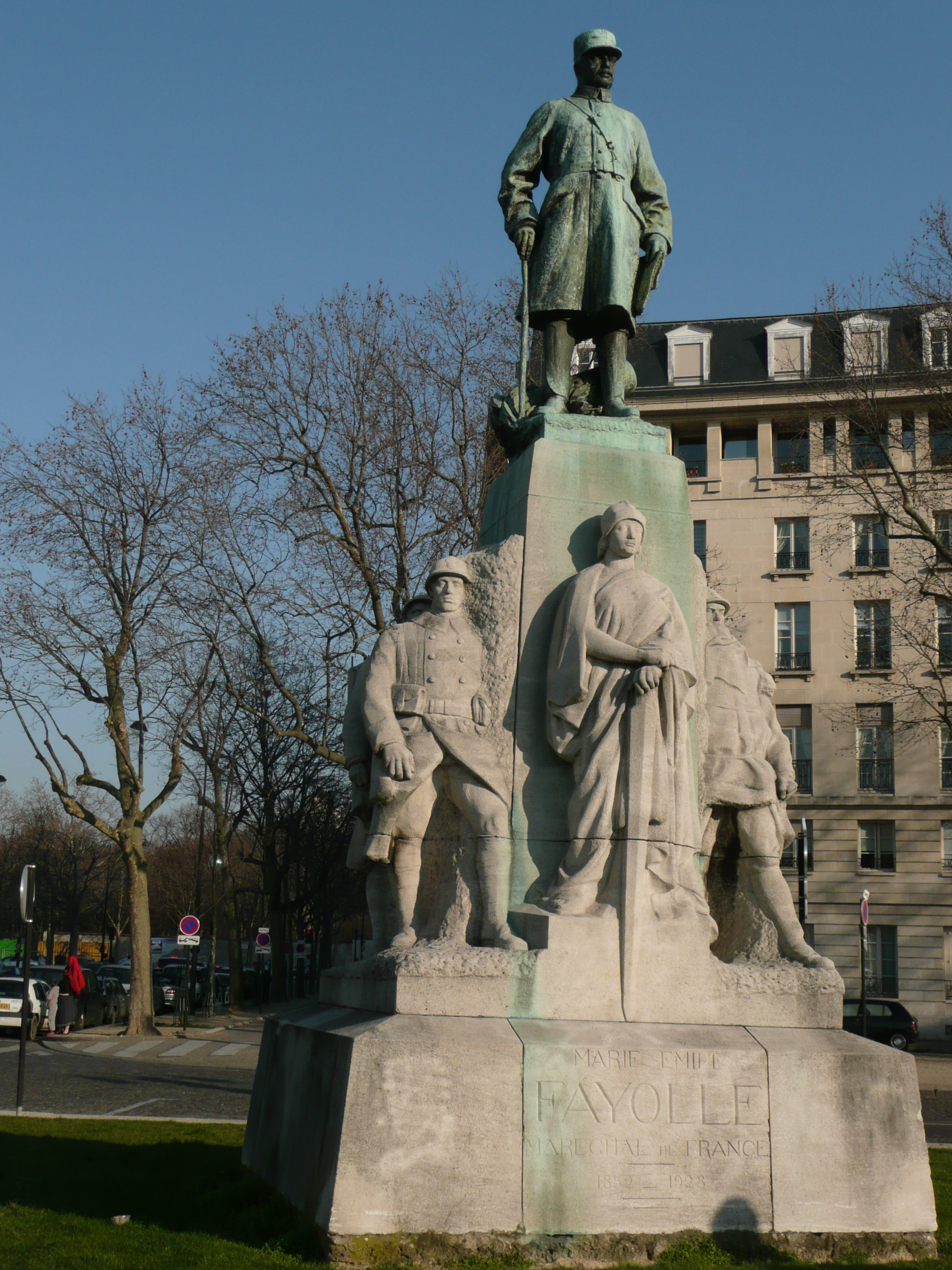
Émile Fayolle

Also in the place Vauban is the monument to another "Maréchal" of France who distinguished himself in the 1914-1918 war; Émile Fayolle. Boucher carried out the sculpture in 1935. We have the figure of Fayolle in bronze and standing on a stone pedestal around which stand four soldiers.

=== Barentin ===
The Mairie of Barentin holds several fragments of the monument "Union de la Bretagne à La France" these being "Tête d'homme"," tête de chevalier","Tête de Charles VIII", "Tête de femme", "Tête de Duguesclin", "Tête de rennaise" and "Tête de Jean Janvier"

=== Bust of Georges Lecompte ===
This can be seen in Mâcon's Musée des Ursulines.

=== Bust of Michel Colombe ===
This bronze Boucher work can be seen in Tours' mairie.

=== Mayenne memorial covering all the wars of the 20th century ===
Inaugurated on 11 November 1937, this monument, with sculpture by Boucher, was given to Mayenne by the Ministère de l’Education Nationale and replaced the old war memorial which was moved to the Mayenne cemetery. The work was entitled "À Condorcet". A semi-circular wall at the rear of the sculpture carries the names of those killed in all the wars of the 20th Century- 304 in the 1914-1918 war, 24 in the 1939-1945 war, 9 civilian casualties of 1944, 10 in the Indochinese war, 1 in the Korean war and 6 in North Africa.

The inscription reads

"Entre les plus beaux noms leurs noms sont les plus beaux"

—

=== Saint Cyr War Memorial ===
This memorial in the Cour Wagram was dedicated to the pupils of the military school Ecole Spéciale Militaire de Saint-Cyr who lost their lives in the 1914-1918 war. It was erected in 1922. The monument was damaged during the 1939-1945 war but the damage was subsequently repaired. Boucher chose the following to be inscribed on the monument

" Pendant 45 ans, la victoire française fut recouverte d'un lourd voile de deuil; Et voici que les Saint-Cyriens arrachent ce voile alors la Victoire apparaît"

The inauguration on 22 May 1922 was conducted by Alexandre Millerand in the presence of Franchet d'Esperey, Ferdinand Foch and Pétain.

=== École Nationale des Beaux-Arts War Memorial ===
This memorial stands in the school's "Cour du mûrier" and Boucher sculpted the figure of a soldier. The memorial inscribed " A nos morts victorieux" lists all the students and staff of the Beaux-Arts who gave their lives for France in 1914-1918. Boucher's sculpture of the soldier but in limestone was used for the Vitré war memorial and a bronze version was used for the Saint-Pierre war memorial in Réunion. The plaster model for the work appeared at the 1921 Salon and this can be seen in Paris' Musée de l'Arc de Triomphe. The bust only was shown at the Salon de la Société des Artistes in 1932 and the Rennes Musée des Beaux-Arts hold a bronze version. We must remember that not only had Boucher been a pupil at the Beaux-Arts but had also on 18 September 1919 become professor and head of the sculptural arm of the school, replacing Antonin Mercié.

=== Vitré War Memorial ===
The Vitré, Ille-et-Vilaine war memorial stands in the place du Château and involves a granite sculpture by Boucher of a soldier. The monument was inaugurated on the 22 May 1921. Boucher depicts a soldier in the trenches leaning on his rifle and lists the names of the 318 men of Vitré who gave their lives in the 1914-1918 war. Boucher had seen service in the Vitré infantry in his first spell of military service.

=== Monument to François Marie Luzel ===
This 1906 sculpture can be seen in Plouaret's Place de l'Église. Luzel was a Breton poet often known by his Breton name Fañch an Uhel. Boucher has created a bust of Luzel on top of three books. Luzel had been born in Plouaret on 6 June 1821. The monument was erected on the initiative of the Bleus de Bretagne.

=== "Monument aux volontaires américains" ===
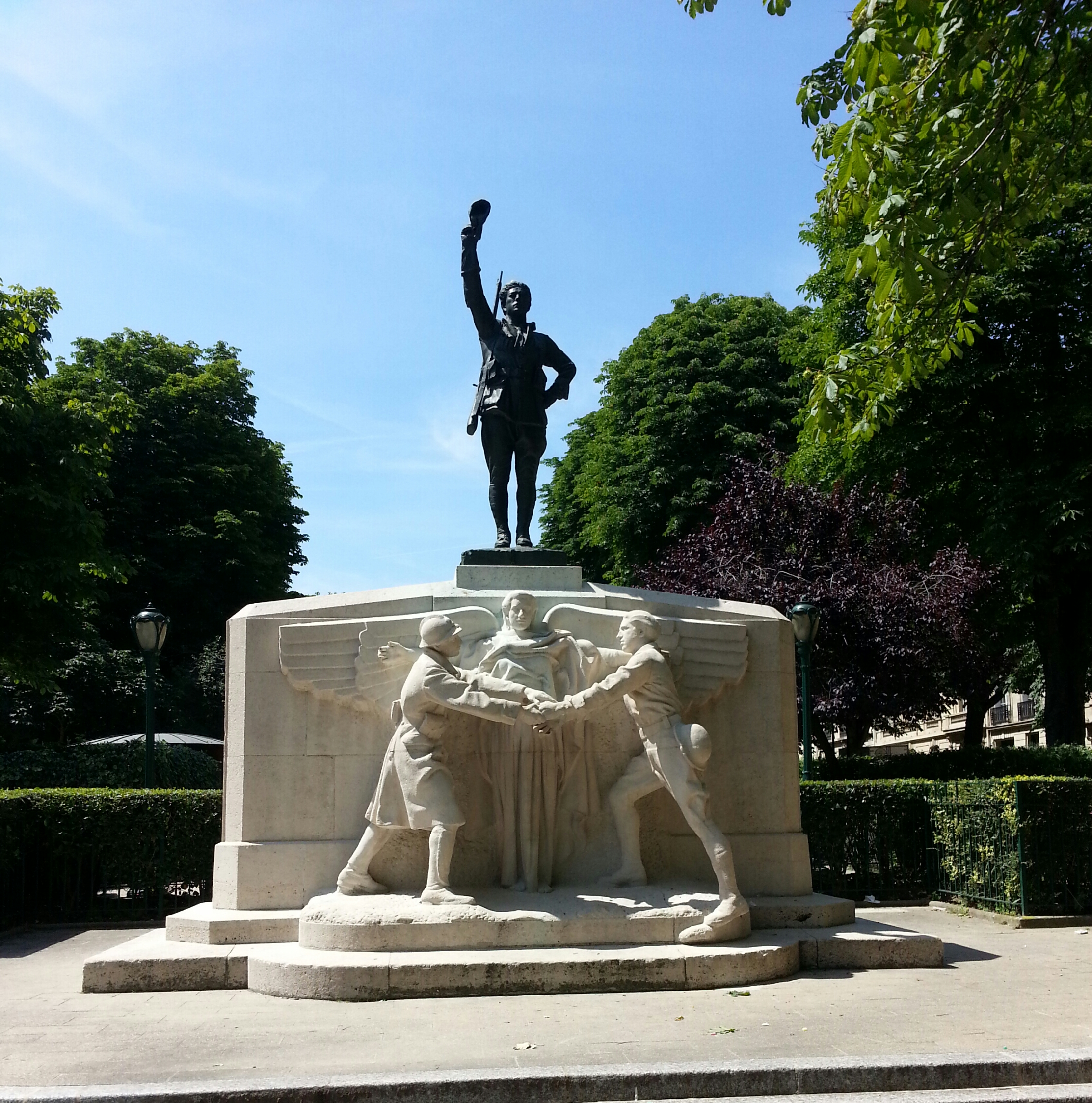
Boucher's "Monument aux volontaires américains"

This 1923 monument can be seen in Paris' Place des États-Unis / Place de l'Amiral de Grasse and is a memorial to all American volunteers. Boucher sculpted a soldier in bronze who stands on a plinth and below two soldiers shake hands before an allegorical figure of Victory. The main inscription reads

"A LA VOLONTAIRES AMERICAINS MORTS POUR LA FRANCE"

The monument was dedicated on 4 July 1923 by Raymond Poincaré and honours those Americans who had volunteered to fight in World War I in the service of France. Boucher had used a photograph of the soldier and poet, Alan Seeger, as his inspiration, and Seeger's name can be found on the back of the plinth among those of twenty-three others who had fallen in the ranks of the French Foreign Legion. Also, on either side of the base of the statue, are two excerpts from Seeger's "Ode in Memory of the American Volunteers Fallen for France", a poem written shortly before his death on 4 July 1916. Seeger intended that his words should be read in Paris on 30 May of that year, at an observance of the American holiday, Decoration Day (later known as Memorial Day):

They did not pursue worldly rewards; they wanted nothing more than to live without regret, brothers pledged to the honor implicit in living one's own life and dying one's own death. Hail, brothers! Goodbye to you, the exalted dead! To you, we owe two debts of gratitude forever: the glory of having died for France, and the homage due to you in our memories.

=== Monument to Victor Hugo ===
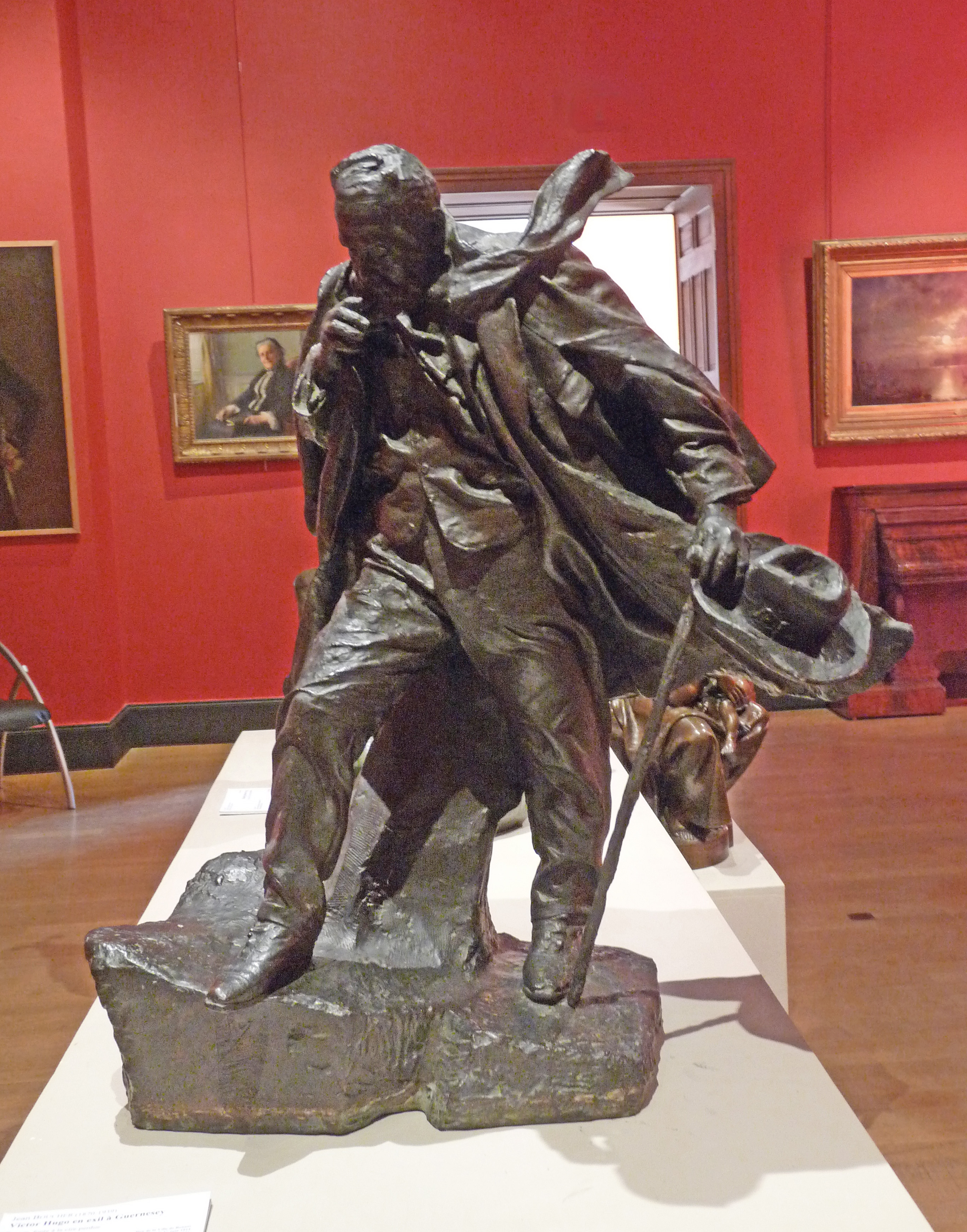
Bronze cast of Victor Hugo sculpture. A gift from Rennes to Raymond Poincaré. Now in the Musée barrois.

Boucher depicts Victor Hugo as an exile standing in a storm on the rocks of Guernsey and facing the sea. The King of Portugal had commissioned Boucher to execute the sculpture for Lisbon but in 1908 political disturbances in Portugal resulted in the order being cancelled. Boucher then decided to exhibit the piece at the 1908 Salon des Artistes français and it was well received and, working through the "Société Victor Hugo", a deal was done to have the work erected in Guernsey. Initially carved in granite from the plaster model, a marble version was finally erected in Candie Gardens, Saint Peter Port, Guernesey. After the war Boucher made several reduced versions of the work and it was cast in bronze by Valsuani in various sizes. A bronze version of the sculpture was shown at the 1931 Salon des Artistes français which then stood in front of the Panthéon in 1935 before it was despatched to Thionville. The Musée Victor Hugo hold a bronze reduction of the work, a plaster " Tête de Victor Hugo" and a bronze mask of Hugo. The Musée de Bar-le-Duc also hold a statuette of Hugo by Boucher. This was given as a gift to Poincaré by the city of Rennes in 1914 and given to the Bar-le-Duc museum by Madame Poincaré in 1936.

=== Combourg War Memorial ===
Boucher worked on the Combourg War Memorial in 1919 and sculpted a soldier and a woman in mourning. The monument also lists the names of the men remembered and the names of some of the war's battles- Verdun, La Marne, L'Yser and Champagne.

=== Monument to Yves Guyot ===
This monument stands in Dinan and honours the French politician, journalist and economist. It was cast in bronze by Alexis Rudier.

=== Monument to Ludovic Trarieux ===
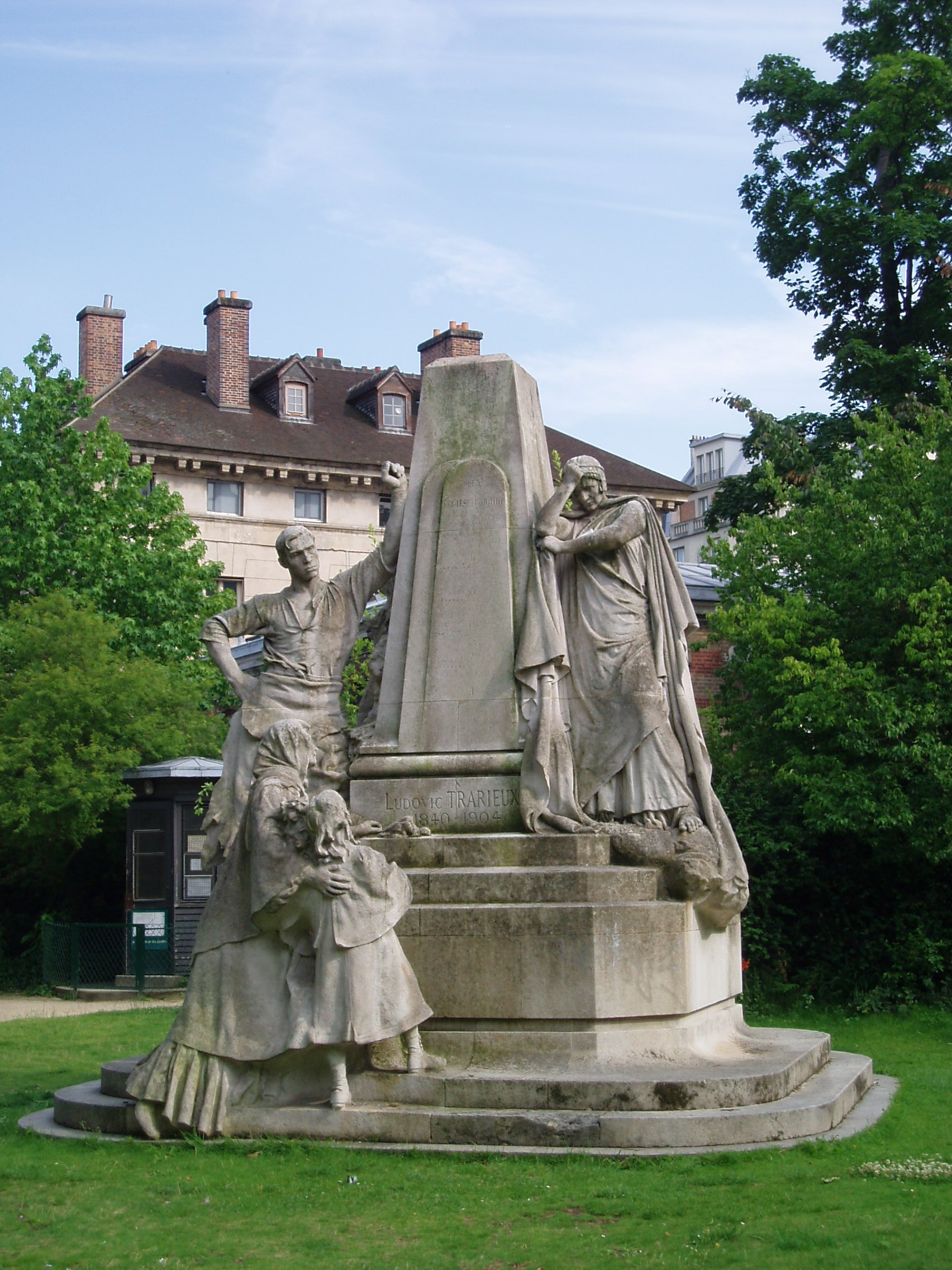
Monument to Ludovic Trarieux

Boucher completed this work, which stands in Paris' square Denfert-Rochereau, in 1907. There was a bronze bust at the top of the memorial to Ludovic Trarieux, but this was confiscated and melted down in 1942. The figures Boucher sculpted were allegories for work and justice and he also created the figure of a widow and orphan.

== Miscellaneous ==
=== Works by Boucher in Hédé ===
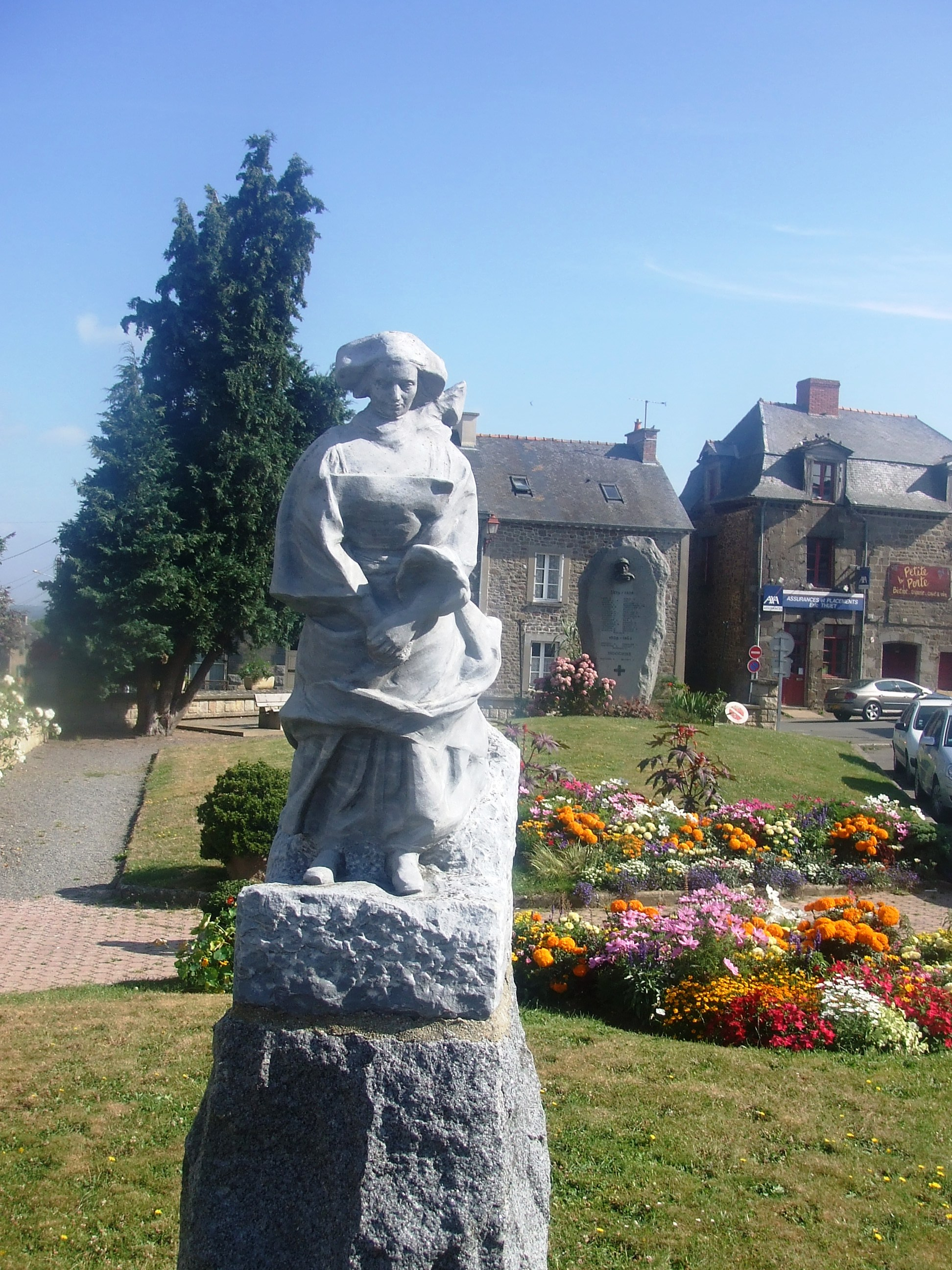
One of Boucher's works on display in Hédé

Boucher lived at one time in Hédé and many of his works are on public display there. There is a square in Hédé that bears Boucher's name and he sculpted the head of Christ for the local church and the head of a soldier for the Hédé war memorial. photographs of some of Boucher's Hédé sculptures are shown in the gallery below.

=== Sculptures on public display in Cesson-Sévigné ===
Cesson-Sévigné has a large collection of sculpture by Boucher, who was of course born there. A sculpture park extends from the Hotel de Ville, and a large statue commemorating Camille Desmoulins' call for the Bastille to be stormed on 13 July 1789, occupies a nearby junction. Other sculptures are present in the Centre Culturel, which also hosts a rolling program of exhibitions and other events.

=== Bust of Anatole Le Braz ===
Anatole Le Braz was at one time a teacher at Quimper's College de la Tour d'Auvergne and there is a bronze Boucher bust of Le Braz in front of the college building.

=== Boucher works in the parc de la Chalotais in Cesson Sévigné ===
Cesson Sévigné was Boucher's birthplace and possess many of his works and archival records. The parc de la Chalotais have a series of Boucher busts on display.

=== Other works held by the Musée des beaux-arts in Rennes ===
This art museum also hold a yellow painted plaster "Buste de femme", a marble "Anne de Bretagne" and a "Buste de pêcheur" cast in bronze by Rousaud.
