= Beaufils =

Beaufils is a French surname. Notable people with the surname include:

- Armel Beaufils (1882–1952), French sculptor
- Jean Beaufils (1936–2024), French politician
- Marie-France Beaufils (born 1946), French politician
