= Emmanuel Guérin =

French sculptor

- Born: 1884
- Died: 1967 (aged 82–83)
- Occupation: Sculptor

Emmanuel Guérin (French pronunciation: [emanɥɛl ɡeʁɛ̃]; 1884–1967) was a French sculptor.

== Brief biography ==
Guérin studied at the École des beaux-arts in Rennes alongside Pierre Charles Lenoir, Éloi Emile Robert, Armel Beaufils, Francis Renaud, Louis Henri Nicot and Jean Boucher.

== Main works ==
Below are details of some of Emmanuel Guérin's sculptures.

== Chartres-de-Bretagne War Memorial ==
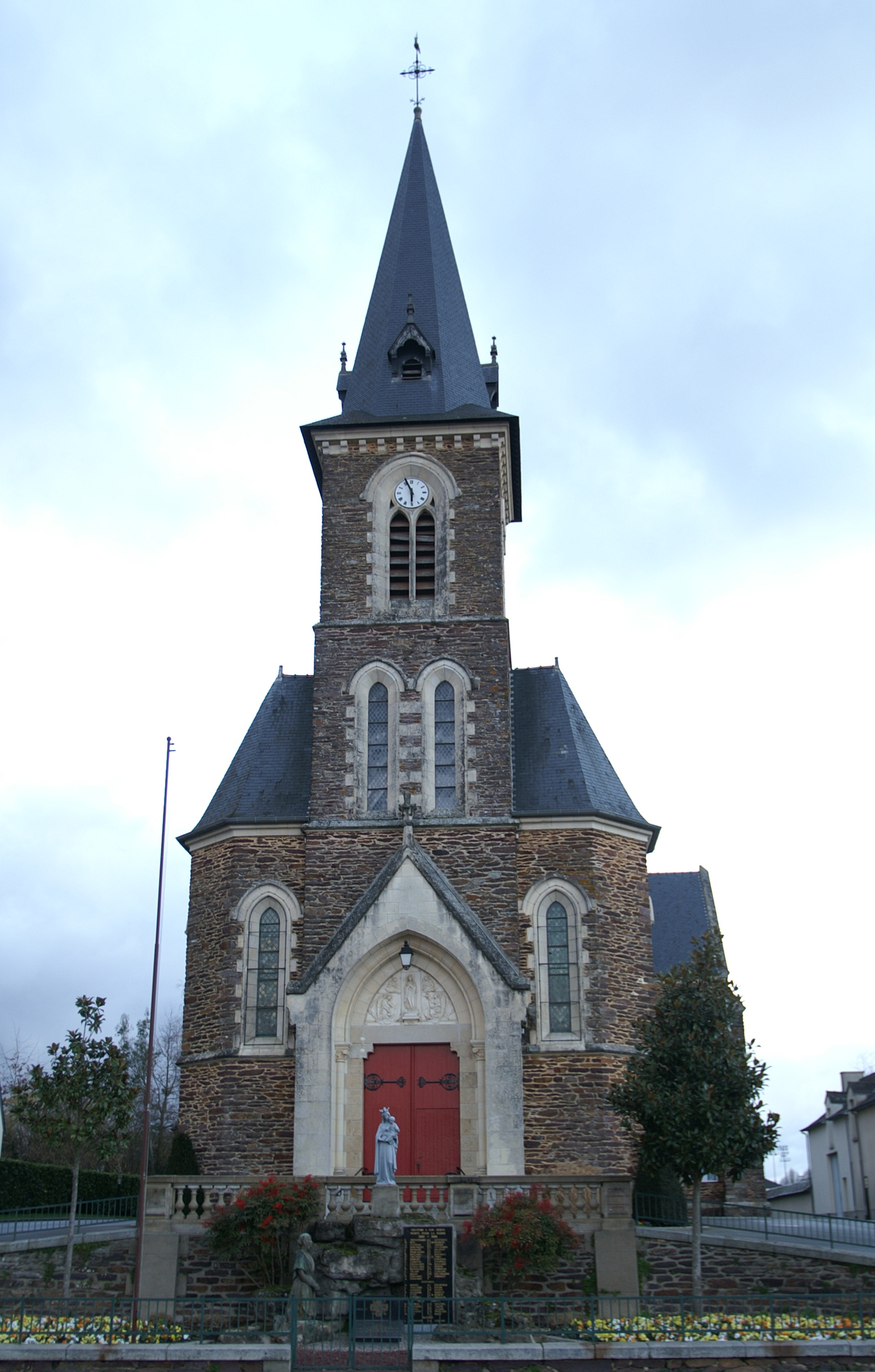
Guérin's war memorial can be seen in front of the Chartres-de-Bretagne church

Guérin's composition for this war memorial was an imaginative one. A woman, dressed in a typical dress of the Rennes district, kneels in prayer before a grotto like arrangements of rocks, similar to the Lourdes grotto, at the top of which is a statue of the Virgin Mary. The original plaster model of this Guérin sculpture was shown at the 1922 Salon de la Société Nationale des Beaux-Arts.

== Bédée War Memorial ==
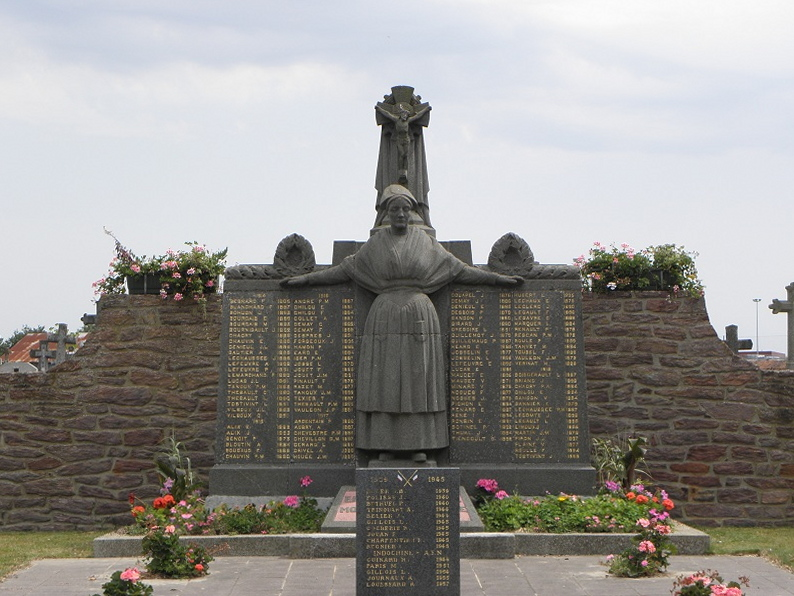
The war memorial at Bédée

This 1920 memorial depicts a sculpture by Guérin of a woman in Breton dress.

== Saint-Gilles War Memorial ==
This monument dates to 1921 and Guérin sculpted the figure of a woman in Breton dress and wearing the Rennes "polka" bonnet.

== Breteil War Memorial ==
The inauguration of this memorial, with a Guérin sculpture of a soldier, took place on 30 September 1923. It is inscribed with the names of 56 men of Breteil who gave their lives for France in the 1914–1918 war and another 12 who died in the 1939–1945 war.
