= Albert Bourget =

French sculptor

Albert Félix Bourget
- Born: 18 October 1881; Rennes, France
- Died: 21 August 1956 (aged 74); Le Minihic-sur-Rance
- Education: École régionale des beaux-arts Rennes École des beaux-arts Paris
- Occupation: Sculptor

Albert Bourget (French pronunciation: [albɛʁ buʁʒɛ]) was a French sculptor born in Rennes on 18 October 1881 and who died in Le Minihic-sur-Rance on 21 August 1956. He studied at the École des beaux-arts in Rennes alongside Pierre Charles Lenoir, Éloi Emile Robert, Armel Beaufils, Emmanuel Guérin, Francis Renaud (sculptor) Louis Henri Nicot and Jean Boucher (artist) and later became professor of sculpture at the school.

== Main works ==
The main works of Albert Bourget are listed below.

=== Bust of Marianne ===
The townhall of Le Minihic-sur-Rance in the place de l' Église has a plaster Bourget bust of this symbol of the French Republic.

=== Saint-Sébastien-sur-Loire War Memorial ===
At the top of a tall column is Bourget's sculpture of a winged angel who holds a crown of laurel in each hand.

=== Laval War Memorial ===
This memorial features a pyramid like structure decorated at the top with the Croix de Guerre at whose base are three bronze sculptures. That in the centre is an allegory for the motherland, armed and helmeted and carrying a flag and sword whilst below her and to her left, a dying soldier reaches up to hand her a statuette depicting "Victory". On the right of the central figure are the Laval coat of arms with a crown, this resting on a bed of laurel leaves. The inscription near the top of the monument reads

"LA VILLE DE LAVAL À SES ENFANTS MORTS POUR LA FRANCE 1914-1918 1939-1945"

The casting of the bronze was undertaken by the Fonderie Veuve Gauthier in Rennes.

=== Pacé War Memorial ===
For this memorial, Bourget's composition was an imaginative one and featured the bronze body of a dead soldier which was placed in a niche in the monument itself. In 2013 the bronze was stolen and broken into four pieces but was recovered and will hopefully be repaired in the near future and placed back in its niche.

=== La piscine Saint-Georges ===
This is one of Rennes's architectural gems built between 1923 and 1926. The architect was Emmanuel Le Ray and the building's decoration includes a "mascaron" of the head of Neptune by Bourget and mosaics by Isidore Odorico.

=== Bieuzy War Memorial ===
Bourget was commissioned in 1925 to provide a sculpture for this memorial and working in granite, he sculpted a helmeted soldier ("poulu") with rifle who leans on a rock looking at a cross and the graves of his comrades.

=== Bust of C.A.Collin ===
This terracotta bust is held in the Rennes Musėe des beaux-arts.

=== The Rennes's Palais du Commerce ===
The figure of Hermes or Mercury holding a caduceus on this building in Rennes, the old PTT headquarters, was sculpted by Bourget as were the statues symbolizing Industry and Agriculture.

=== Église paroissiale Sainte-Thérèse ===
This Rennes church, built in 1936 and designed by Hyacinthe Perrin stands in the rue Bigot-de-Préameneu. It holds mosaics by Isidore Odorico, paintings by Louis Garrain and sculpture by Bourget who created a depiction of Christ on the Cross for the church's porch and several gargoyles.

=== Miscellaneous ===
It was Bourget who carried out the restoration work on Saint-Malo's statue of the Virgin Mary and Jesus in the Notre-Dame de la Grand'Porte church.
