= Chartres-de-Bretagne =

Chartres-de-Bretagne Chartr (Gallo) Karnod (Breton)
- Commune
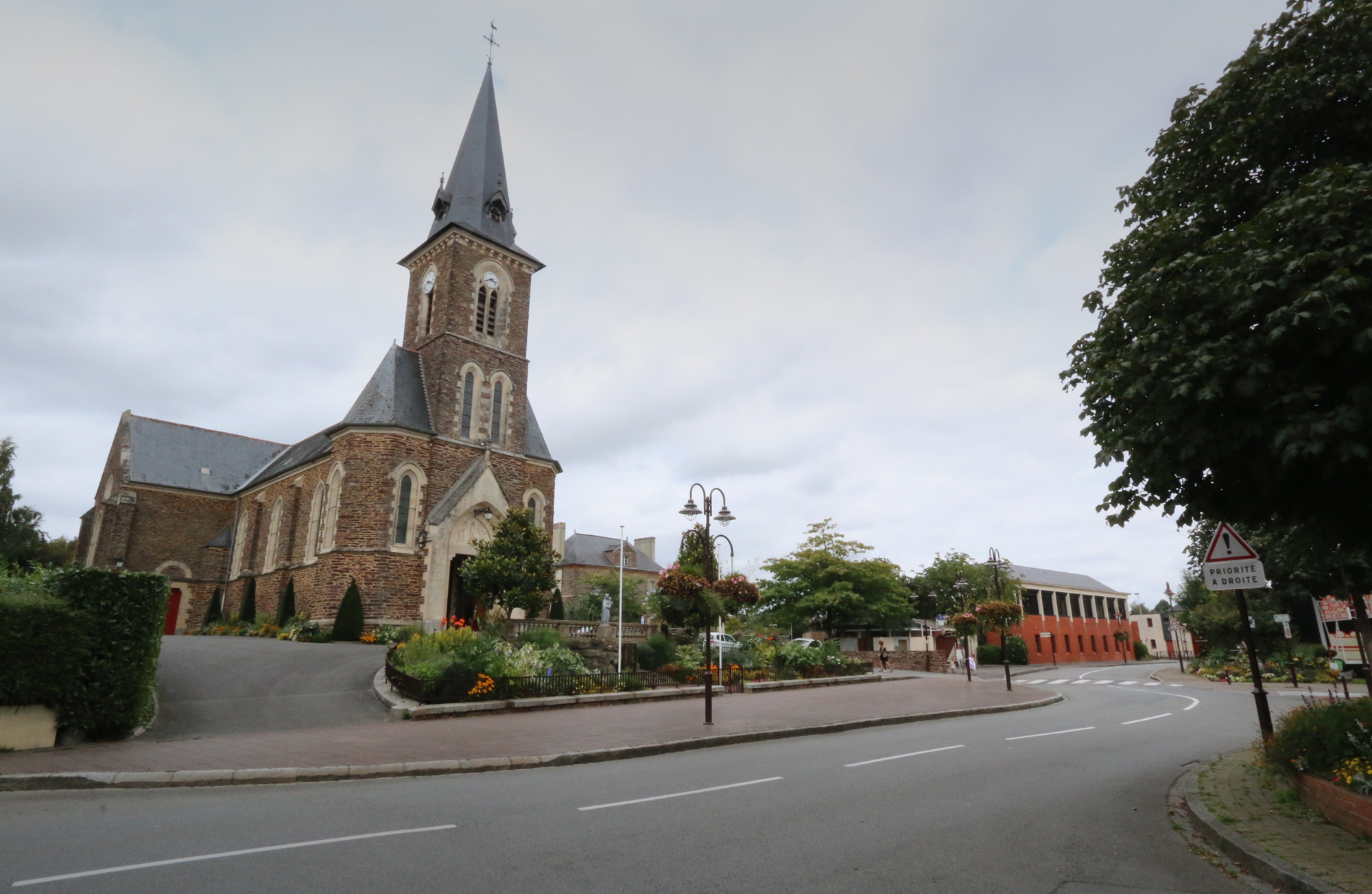
- Notre Dame church

- Coat of arms
- Location of Chartres-de-Bretagne
- Location within France Location within Brittany
- Coordinates: 48°02′25″N 1°42′10″W
- Country: France
- Region: Brittany
- Department: Ille-et-Vilaine
- Arrondissement: Rennes
- Canton: Bruz
- Intercommunality: Rennes Métropole

Government
  - Mayor (2020–2026): Philippe Bonnin
- Area^{1}: 9.95 km^{2} (3.84 sq mi)
- Highest elevation: 50 m (160 ft)
- Lowest elevation: 16 m (52 ft)
- Population (2023): 8,880
  - Density: 892/km^{2} (2,310/sq mi)
- Time zone: UTC+01:00 (CET)
  - Summer (DST): UTC+02:00 (CEST)
- INSEE/Postal code: 35066 /35131
- ^{1} French Land Register data, which excludes lakes, ponds, glaciers > 1 km^{2} (0.386 sq mi or 247 acres) and river estuaries.

Chartres-de-Bretagne (French pronunciation: [ʃaʁtʁ də bʁətaɲ]; Breton: Karnod, Gallo: Chartr) is a commune in the Ille-et-Vilaine department of Brittany in northwestern France.

Inhabitants of Chartres-de-Bretagne are called Chartrains in French.

== Population ==
Historical population

Year	Pop.	±% p.a.
1793	719	—
1800	757	+0.74%
1806	810	+1.13%
1821	620	−1.77%
1831	737	+1.74%
1836	757	+0.54%
1841	768	+0.29%
1846	770	+0.05%
1851	780	+0.26%
1856	748	−0.83%
1861	791	+1.12%
1866	867	+1.85%
1872	846	−0.41%
1876	875	+0.85%
1881	945	+1.55%
1886	952	+0.15%
1891	1,056	+2.10%
1896	1,070	+0.26%
1901	984	−1.66%

Year	Pop.	±% p.a.
1906	901	−1.75%
1911	845	−1.28%
1921	718	−1.62%
1926	771	+1.43%
1931	763	−0.21%
1936	764	+0.03%
1946	895	+1.60%
1954	1,005	+1.46%
1962	1,770	+7.33%
1968	1,579	−1.89%
1975	3,100	+10.12%
1982	4,869	+6.66%
1990	5,543	+1.63%
1999	6,467	+1.73%
2007	6,948	+0.90%
2012	7,349	+1.13%
2017	7,800	+1.20%
2023	8,880	+2.18%

Source: EHESS and INSEE (1968-2023)

== See also ==
- Communes of the Ille-et-Vilaine department
- Emmanuel Guérin Sculptor Chartres-de-Bretagne war memorial
