= Saint-Gilles, Ille-et-Vilaine =

Saint-Gilles Saent-Jill (Gallo) Sant-Jill-Roazhon (Breton)
- Commune
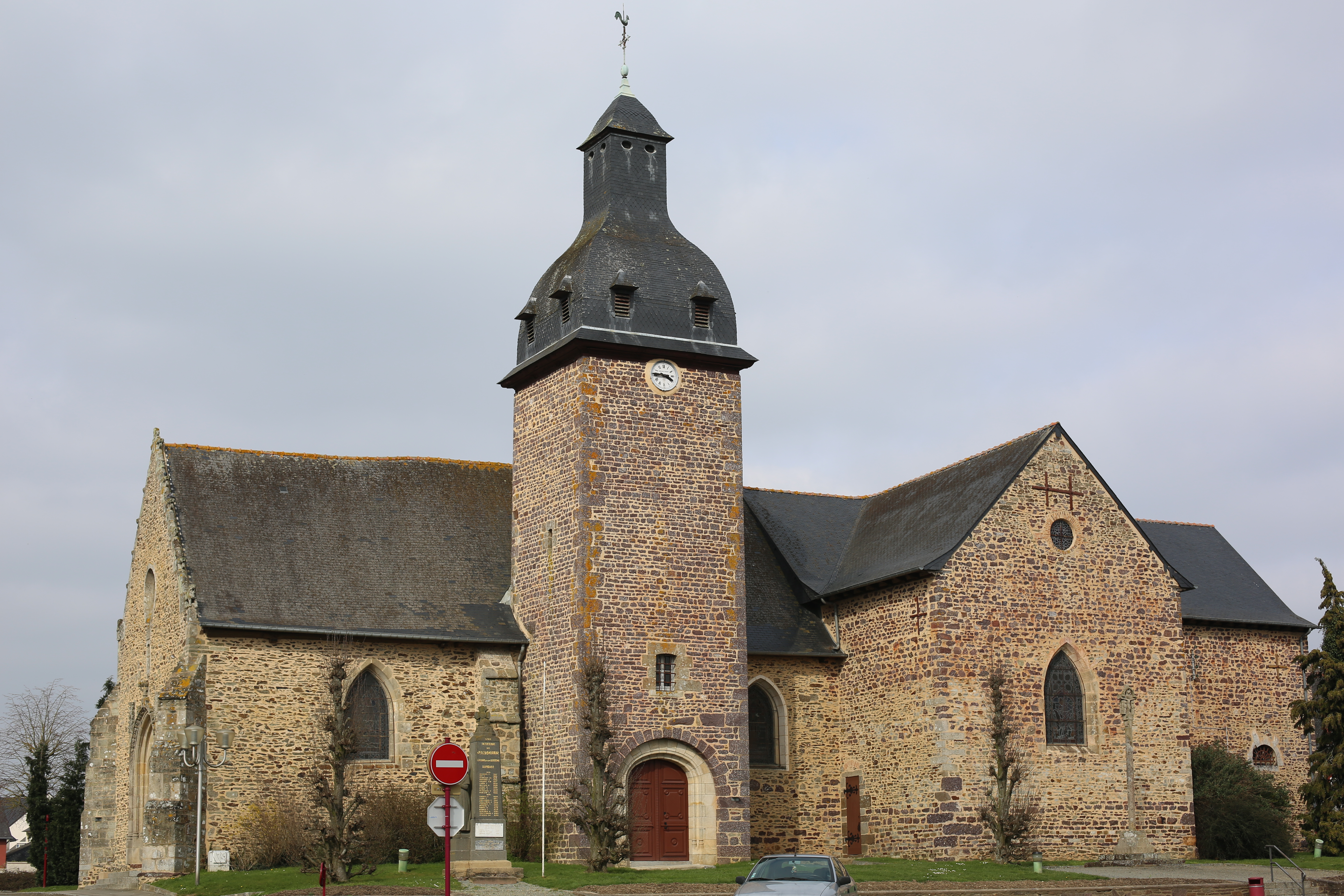
- The church of Saint-Gilles

- Coat of arms
- Location of Saint-Gilles
- Location within France Location within Brittany
- Coordinates: 48°09′16″N 1°49′28″W
- Country: France
- Region: Brittany
- Department: Ille-et-Vilaine
- Arrondissement: Rennes
- Canton: Melesse
- Intercommunality: Rennes Métropole

Government
  - Mayor (2020–2026): Philippe Thébault
- Area^{1}: 20.72 km^{2} (8.00 sq mi)
- Highest elevation: 96 m (315 ft)
- Lowest elevation: 34 m (112 ft)
- Population (2023): 5,576
  - Density: 269.1/km^{2} (697.0/sq mi)
- Time zone: UTC+01:00 (CET)
  - Summer (DST): UTC+02:00 (CEST)
- INSEE/Postal code: 35275 /35590
- ^{1} French Land Register data, which excludes lakes, ponds, glaciers > 1 km^{2} (0.386 sq mi or 247 acres) and river estuaries.

Saint-Gilles (French pronunciation: [sɛ̃ ʒil]; Breton: Sant-Jili-Roazhon; Gallo: Saent-Jill) is a commune in the Ille-et-Vilaine department in Brittany in northwestern France.

== Population ==
Inhabitants of Saint-Gilles are called saint-gillois in French.

Historical population
| Year | Pop. | ±% p.a. |
|---|---|---|
| 1968 | 1,137 | — |
| 1975 | 1,916 | +7.74% |
| 1982 | 2,808 | +5.61% |
| 1990 | 3,059 | +1.08% |
| 1999 | 3,463 | +1.39% |
| 2007 | 3,549 | +0.31% |
| 2012 | 3,848 | +1.63% |
| 2017 | 4,984 | +5.31% |
| 2023 | 5,576 | +1.89% |
Source: INSEE

== See also ==
- Communes of the Ille-et-Vilaine department
- Emmanuel Guérin Sculptor of Saint-Gilles, Ille-et-Vilaine war memorial
