= Jean Beaufils =

French politician (1936–2024)

Deputy of the French National Assembly
- In office 2 July 1981 – 1 April 1993
- Preceded by: Irénée Bourgois
- Succeeded by: Édouard Leveau
- Constituency: Seine-Maritime's 9th constituency (1981–1986); Proportional representation (1986–1988); Seine-Maritime's 11th constituency (1988–1993)

Personal details
- Born: 1 September 1936 Dieppe, France
- Died: 12 September 2024 (aged 88) Dieppe, France
- Party: PS
- Occupation: Schoolteacher

Jean Beaufils (1 September 1936 – 12 September 2024) was a French politician of the Socialist Party.

== Life and career ==
Born in Dieppe on 1 September 1936, Beaufils was first elected to the National Assembly in 1981. He was re-elected in 1986 and 1988. In 1993, he was defeated by Édouard Leveau.

Beaufils died in Dieppe on 12 September 2024, at the age of 88.

== Publication ==
- Les Dieppois et la mer (with Franck Boitell, 2009)
