= Louis Henri Nicot =

French sculptor (1878–1944)

- Born: 12 February 1878; Rennes, France
- Died: 12 July 1944 (aged 66); Paris, France
- Occupations: Sculptor and modeller in ceramics

Louis Henri Nicot (French: [lwi ɑ̃ʁi niko]; 12 February 1878 – 12 July 1944) was a French sculptor.

== Biography ==
Louis-Henri Nicot was born in Rennes on 12 February 1878. His father was a builder. He attended the Rennes École des Murs and in 1886 was enrolled at the Lycée de Rennes, He then joined the École des Beaux-Arts in Rennes and was there for three years. His schooling was interrupted in 1899 when he was called up for military service and joined the 41st Infantry regiment as a "soldat de 2e classe". However being stationed at the Rennes' St Georges barracks meant that he could continue to call in at the École des Beaux-Arts. In November 1902 his term of service over, he was put on the reserve list. He left the army with the rank of sergeant. He now applied to join the Ếcole nationale des Beaux-arts in Paris. His time at the Rennes art school had been a great success and he had studied alongside such Breton sculptors as Pierre Lenoir, Éloi Emile Robert, Émile Jean Armel Beaufils, Emmanuel Guérin, Francis Renaud (sculptor), Albert Bourget and Jean Boucher (artist).

He set off for Paris in April 1899 but was not immediately accepted by the Ếcole nationale des Beaux-Arts and received only "temporary" status in November 1900, November 1901 and May 1902. Once a permanent student at the school, he tried unsuccessfully for the "Prix de Rome" in 1906 and 1908 but did get third prize in the school's "trois-arts" competition and received several other medals and prizes. The Ếcole Nationale des Beaux-Arts in Paris hold ex-pupils works in their archives and the collection includes a 1906 Nicot design which was his entry for the "Figure dessinée d'après l'antique" competition (Bridan prize) held each year by the school. His work "Fauna Borghèse" won the second prize.

On 14 September 1909, one year after leaving the Ếcole des Beaux-arts, he married Jeanne-marie Le gallais at the mairie of Paris' 15e arrondissement and the birth of daughters Monique in 1912 and Yves in 1914 increased the need for Nicot to earn money from his sculpture and during the prewar years he executed many sculptural decorations for buildings, more often than not carving directly into the stone "in situ", and he executed such work in the Rue Frémiet in Passy and the Paris streets of Rue des Eaux, la Rue Renouard, la Rue Fournier, the Avenue Choisy and Avenue Émile-Zola. Most of the decoration involved flowers or animals. He also worked on the decoration of Reims's Palais de justice and the Hôtels de ville of Moÿ-de-l'Aisne and Pont-Sainte-Maxence and the churches of Moÿ-de-l'Aisne and Woirel as well as the "Salle d’honneur" at the Château de Rocheux.

Nicot received his mobilization papers on 2 August 1914 and joined the 2nd Aviation group. He worked as a photographer serving in the General Reserve and in June 1915 was part of F40 squadron. His health began to deteriorate and he suffered from a chronique onset of kidney stones and in May 1917 was hospitalised in Bar-le-Duc, then Charolles and Mâcon. Finally in April 1918 he was back home.

== Main works ==
Nicot's principal works were the following.

=== War memorials ===
Brittany lost some 240,000 men killed in the 1914–1918 war and every family and every commune was touched by that war and as was the case throughout France there was a hunger to mark these losses with some form of memorial. Those left behind felt it a duty to honour those lost in some tangible form and in November 1919, the association "La Bretagne artistique" sent a circular to all Breton Hôtel de ville promising their cooperation in creating sculptural decoration for any of the memorials erected. Nicot was involved in the following war memorials:

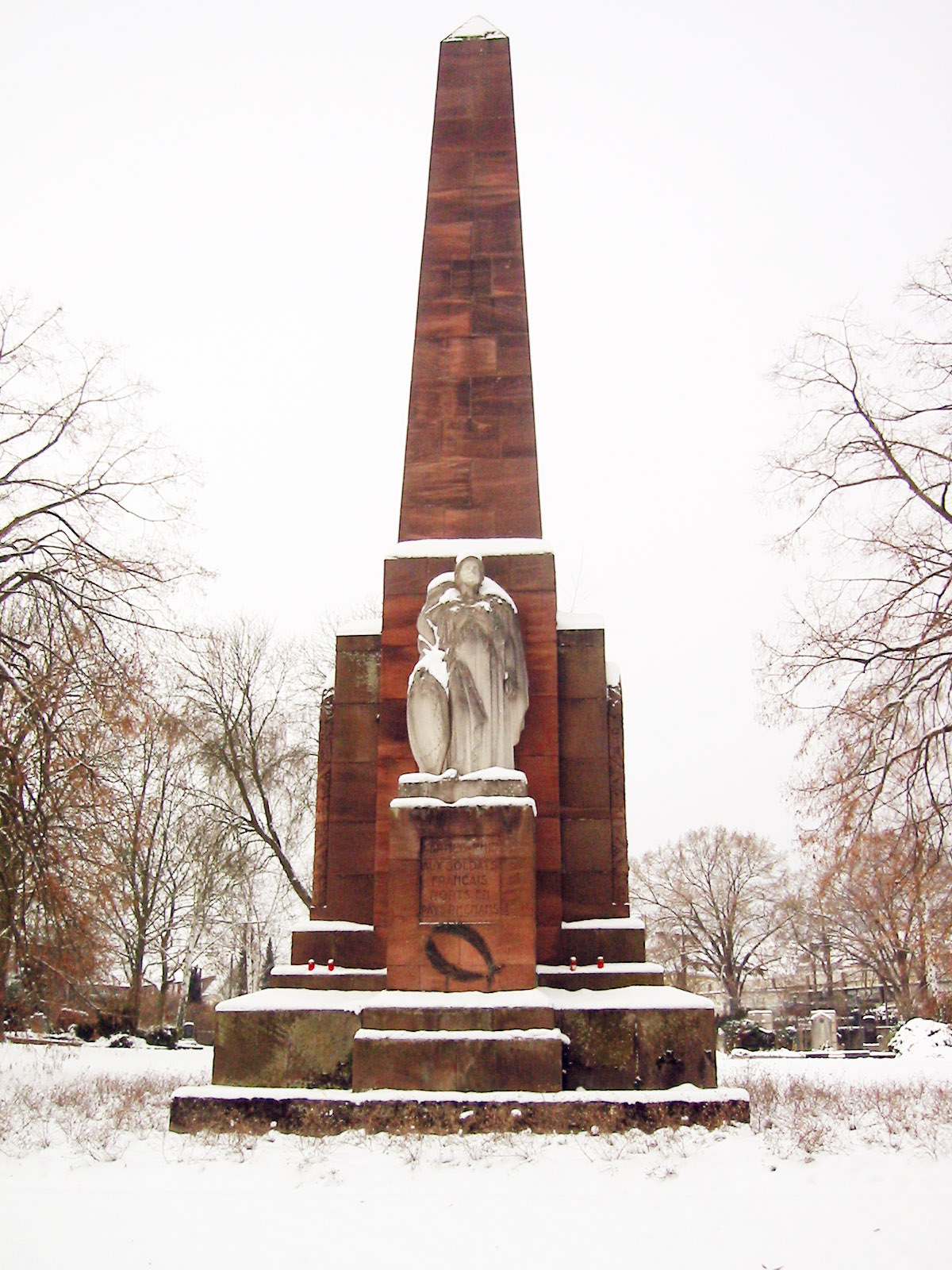
Mainz memorial

- Pleurtuit War Memorial. This memorial was inaugurated on 15 January 1922. Nicot was commissioned to create the sculpture involved and the result was a standing soldier on a pedestal and below a woman looking up to the soldier and overcome by grief a ("Pleureuse"). The soldier was depicted crushing a German eagle and the woman wore a Breton headdress. In 1944 a battle was waged around Pleurtuit from 7 to 13 August and in the fighting Nicot's soldier was destroyed. After the war a replacement soldier was created.
- Paramé War Memorial. For Paramé, Nicot used the same composition as for Pleurtuit. The soldier, representing "Victory" stands on a pedestal, his right foot on a German Imperial eagle and below is a woman of Paramé, her head lowered in grief. Originally it was proposed to have the woman cast in bronze but Nicot opted to have the figure sculpted in Kersanton thus matching the soldier.
- Guémené-Penfao War Memorial. Again Nicot depicts a soldier and grieving woman in Breton dress but in this composition the soldier is dead and the distraught woman looks down at his body lying on the ground before her.
- Montfort-sur-Meu War Memorial. When Nicot put forward his ideas for the design of the Montfort-sur-Meu war memorial, he was proposing a similar composition to that used at Guémené-Penfao, of a "pleureuse" grieving over a dead soldier, but the adjudicating committee thought this too harsh for display in a public place. Nicot then put an alternative to the committee, a composition entitled "La Gloire couronnant le Poilu" and this was adopted in February 1922. The resultant memorial depicts a female allegory for glory ("La Gloire") crowning a soldier.
- Camors War Memorial. For this memorial Nicot changed tack completely and the result was a single standing soldier and two bronze medallions one dated 1914 and the other 1918. They depict a soldier in profile wearing the uniform issued at the beginning of the war and that worn in the final year of the war.
- Etretat War Memorial. Nicot repeated his Camors composition for Etretat but in limestone.
- Saint-Julien-de-Civry War Memorial. Again the Camors' statue but in limestone.
- Cancale War Memorial. This memorial dates to 1931 Nicot working with the architect Bolloré. In Nicot's composition an angel of Victory, her arms crossed and wings spread, has at her feet a soldier and a sailor, the latter leaning on a ship's anchor.
- War Memorial dedicated to the "Dragons". This marble plaque by Nicot was executed in 1939 and can be seen in Paris' Hôtel des Invalides.
- Lozen War Memorial. This memorial in kersantite dates to 1922.
- Memorial in Mainz cemetery. Nicot sculpted an "angel of victory" for this memorial to all French soldiers who lost their lives fighting in the Rhine region.

=== Other work linked to the 1914–1918 war ===
- A plaque to the 10th French army. This marble plaque is located in Rennes and was inaugurated on 25 May 1925 by General Passaga.
- Another marble plaque to the 41st, 241st, 410th Infantry and the 75th RIT (Régiment d'infanterie territoriale) was inaugurated 11 November 1928 at Renne's Palais St Georges. Nicot carved in profile, soldiers from different periods all facing towards a "Victoire" figure.
- Another marble plaque was organised by the "La société des anciens combattants Bretons" to remember those 240,000 Breton men killed in the 1914–1918 war. This was placed in the "Gallerie des maréchaux" in Les Invalides.
- For Rennes' Lycée de garçons Nicot, executed a bronze plaque dedicated to those pupils and staff who died in the war.

=== Other works ===
Apart from the above war memorials, Nicot worked on the following:

- Statue of Théodore Botrel in Pont-Aven. The monument stands in Pont-Aven's square Théodore Botrel. Inaugurated in 1932. Botrel, a famous Breton songwriter, lived in Pont-Aven from 1907 to 1925.
- "Après le bain". This work by Nicot in white marble can be seen in Rennes' Musée des Beaux-arts. The composition was first exhibited as a plaster statuette at the 1904 Salon and a marble version appeared the next year and it was in 1911 that the Rennes municipality finally purchased the piece for the sum of one thousand francs. "Après le bain" heralded a period when Nicot produced several works of a neo-classical nature. At the 1907 Salon des artistes français he exhibited "Orphée" a work in plaster, and in 1908 a study of "Pan and Syrinx", the same work being shown in bronze at the 1911 salon. In 1910, an allegorical study entitled "Le Printemps" was shown at the salon and won a third class medal.
- Plaque to Léon Durocher. This 1937 plaque honouring the French writer and poet can be seen at Trégastel. The plaque was originally meant for the Roche des Poètes in Ploumanac'h but was placed here on a rock near the chapel of Sainte-Anne de Trégastel, where Durocher had built a villa in 1900.
- "La Jeune femme au lévrier". Another neo-classical piece, this work in limestone can be seen in Montreuil's parc de Montreau albeit in poor condition. Rennes' art museum hold a copy of this work.
- "Annaïck Mam Goz". This sculpture is one of Nicot's best known works and was exhibited at the 1935 Salon des artistes français. It depicts a seated and melancholy grandmother (Mam Goz) and is sculpted using sandstone from Kersanton. It is now located near the l'Hôtel-Dieu in Rennes' rue de Saint-Malo. The Musée du Faouët hold a bronze version and one in pottery and a granite maquette is held in the Musée d'art et d'histoire de Saint-Brieuc.
- "Vieille paimpolaise". This bronze by Nicot can be seen in Rennes' Musée des Beaux-Arts.
- Bust of René Pinard. This plaster bust of the French engraver is held in Nantes' Musée des beaux-arts.
- "La Roche des Poètes" in Ploumanac'h. Nicot's 1933 bronze of Charles Le Goffic, the Breton poet, novelist and historian, is part of "La Roche des Poètes" in the Rue des Carrière. The memorial consists of three bronze plaques affixed to a large rock, the plaques honouring Le Goffic, Gabriel Vicaire by the sculptor Pierre Lenoir and Anatole Le Braz by Emile Jean Armel-Beaufils. Over the years the site has been known as the "Roche du Dante", the "Roche des Soupirs", the "Roche des Martyrs" and the "Roche des Poètes".
- Plaster bust "vieille bretonne". This bust by Nicot decorates the Tréguier mairie.
- "Evangeline". A version of this work in the blue granite of Kersanton won the gold medal at the 1933 Salon. Evangeline featured in Longfellow's poetry. The plaster version is held by the Rennes musée des beaux-arts.
- Le Monument néoceltique d’Étampes. In 1925 and for the Exposition des Arts décoratifs et industriels in Paris, one of the pavilions was called the "Pergola de la Douce France". It included sixteen bas-reliefs by some of the leading "art deco" sculptors of the day including Nicot. When the exhibition ended these reliefs were fortunately kept and in 1934 were purchased by Étampes and can now be seen in the gardens of the Tour Guinette. The work comprises four large blocks on which sixteen bas-reliefs have been created by various sculptors using a mixture of Lens and Rupt stone. Louis Nicot was the sculptor of "Le Cerf" and "Taliésin et Ganiéda". Georges Saupique executed the reliefs "Le Saint Graal" and "L’Aurochs". The remaining reliefs Include "Les serpents des druides" executed by members of Pierre Seguin's workshop, a work by Pablo Manès "Lancelot et Guenièvre", "Le Cheval sauvage" by Georges Hilbert, Ossip Zadkine's "Le Dragon", Raoul Lamourdedieu's two works "Merlin et Viviane" and "Joseph d’Arimathie", Joachim Costa's three works called "Tristan et Iseult", " La fée Koridwen" and "Le nain Gwyon ", Jan and Joël Martel's "L’île d’Avalon" and "Le roi Arthur" and François Pompon's "Le Sanglier".

== Ceramics ==
Apart from his sculptures, Nicot created many ceramic figurines ("petites céramiques bretonnes"), working with the famous Henriot factory (La faïencerie Henriot-Quimpe) and with FAB (Faïencerie d’Art Breton). Below, some of Nicot's best known works are listed. Often the preparatory work matched that for a sculpture, a drawing, a model, a maquette, etc. Then the work could be worked up to a full-sized sculpture or a small ceramic figurine.

=== Pottery pieces with Henriot ===
Introduced to the Henriot factory in 1924 by Mathurin Méheut. His work with Henriot included:-

- "Les trois commères" or "Commérages"
- "Vieille femme à la quenouille"
- "Vieille femme de Paimpol"
- "Trégoroise"
- "Annaïc Mam goz du Faouët"
- "Evangéline"
- "Femme de Plonéour Trez au marché".
- "Femme de Pontivy au chapelet"
- "Femme de Pontivy à la pipe"
- "Buste de Bigoudène"
- "Jeune femme de Pont-Aven"
- "L'homme au veau"
- "Chat"

=== Pottery pieces with FAB.Faïencerie d’Art Breton ===
- "L'offrande"
- "Le voeu à Saint Yves"
- "Bigoudène aux paniers"
- "Vieille femme à la quenouille"
- "Bigoudène aux paniers".

== Funerary work ==
Nicot was commissioned to provide sculptural decoration for several tombs, including those detailed below.

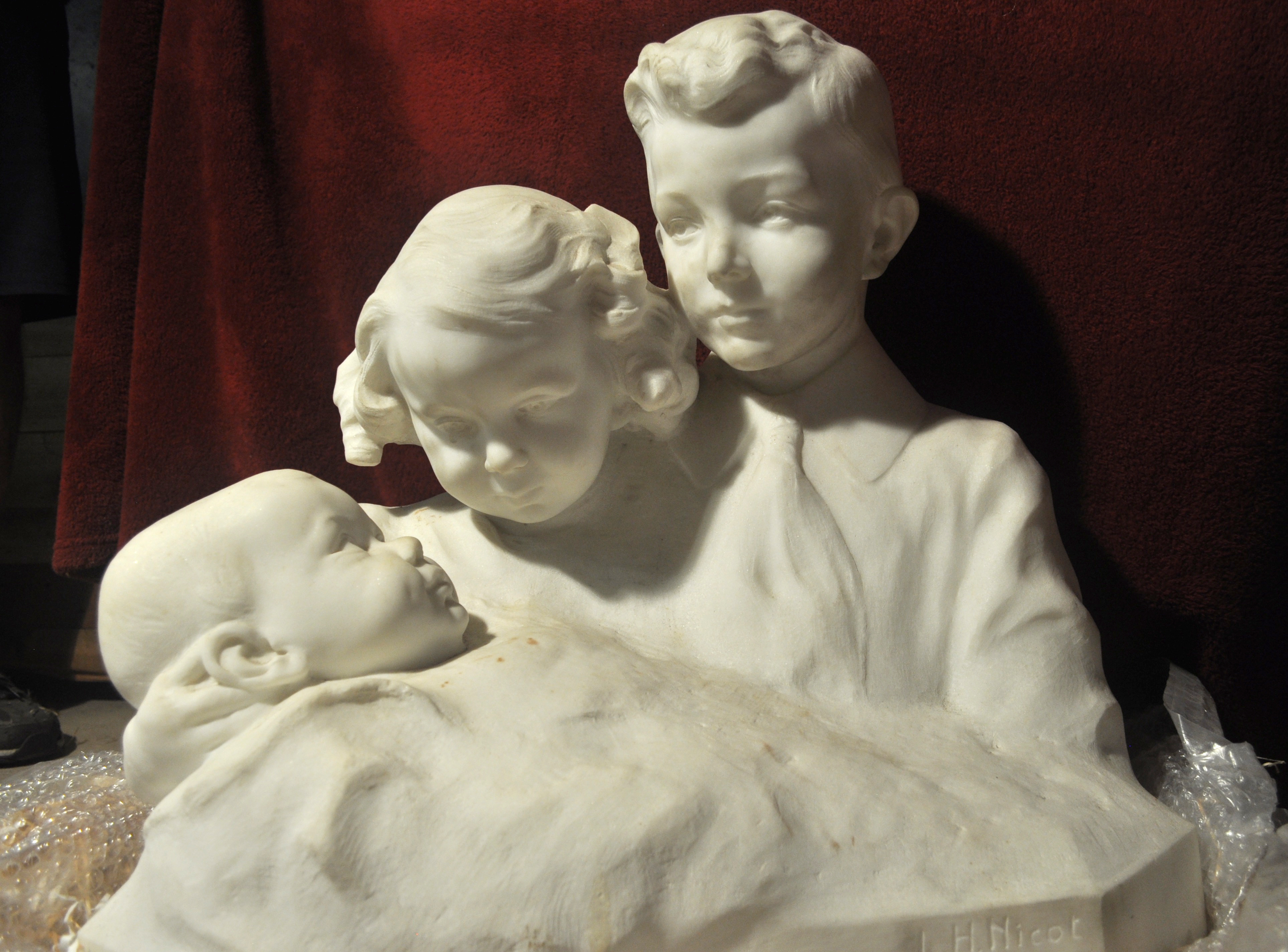

- "L’Hymne à la mort". In 1912 Nicot was commissioned to add sculpture to the tomb of Gilbert Le Lasseur de Ranzay, the aviator and poet killed in a flying accident.
- "l’Évangéline". Commissioned by Mr and Mrs Lucien Daniel for the tomb of their son Jean killed on 24 September 1915.
- Bust of René Pinard. Nicot executed a bronze bust for the tomb of this artist in Nantes.
- Three Children. Commission by Godon Vasnier c.1910

For an exhibition organised in 1903 by the "Association artistique de Bretagne", Nicot exhibited a marble medallion depicting his uncle, the painter J.B. Cacheux, and a bust of the Rennes painter C. Nitsch, and in the years to follow, Nicot was to create medallion portraits of many artists and contemporaries. These include the designer Benjamin Rabier, the architect Jules Longuet, the aviator Alfred Leblanc, the sculptors Florenza and Lavieuville, Sir John Woodyatt, Bertrand d’Aramon, Edmond Teulet, Achille Philip, Admiral Guépratte, Louis Beaufrère, Jules Henriot, the Marquis de l'marquis de l'Estour-Beillon, Eugène Le mouël, Léon Berthaut and Auguste Dupouy, and Lucien Daniel.
