= Pierre Charles Lenoir =

French sculptor (1879–1953)

Pierre Charles Eugène Lenoir
- Born: 23 May 1879; Paris
- Died: 9 September 1953 (aged 74)
- Education: École régionale des beaux-arts de Rennes and École nationale supérieure des beaux-arts de Paris
- Occupation: Sculptor

Pierre Lenoir (French pronunciation: [pjɛʁ lənwaʁ]; 23 May 1879, in Paris – 9 September 1953, in Paris) was a French sculptor.

== Biography ==
Pierre Lenoir was a French sculptor and medallist and was one of the Breton sculptors born in the 1880s who studied together at the École régionale des Beaux-Arts in Rennes; Jean Boucher, Louis-Henri Nicot, Armel-Beaufils, Paul Le Goff, Eloi Robert, Albert Bourget and Francis Renaud. He was the son of the sculptor Charles Joseph Lenoir. He married the painter Mathilde Berthe Thorel who also used the name Mathilde Lenoir. He studied at the École des beaux-arts de Rennes and the École des beaux-arts de Paris. He became the director of the École des beaux-arts de Rennes and in 1931 he was made a Chevalier de la Légion d'honneur. He died on 9 September 1953 and is buried in the Thorel family grave in the Père-Lachaise cemetery. A plaque marks his residence between 1914 and 1953 at 12 rue d'Auteuil in Paris.

== Main works ==
Lenoir's main works were:-

== War memorials ==
Brittany lost some 240,000 men killed in the 1914-1918 war and every family and every commune was touched by that war, and as was the case throughout France, there was a hunger to mark these losses with some form of memorial. Those left behind felt it a duty to honour those lost in some tangible form and in November 1919 the association "La Bretagne artistique" sent a circular to all Breton Hôtel de ville promising their cooperation in creating sculptural decoration for the memorials erected.

- Penmarc'h War Memorial. For this memorial Lenoir sculpted a widow shrouded in a Breton cloak. The effect is most dramatic! It was originally intended to depict two women, one standing and the other on her knees but only one was completed.
- Briec War Memorial. This memorial dates to 1922 and has Lenoir sculptures in kersantite. The figure of the soldier and the small "pietà" on one side of the obelisk were based on models by Lenoir but the actual carving was carried out by Jean Joncourt.

== Medals ==
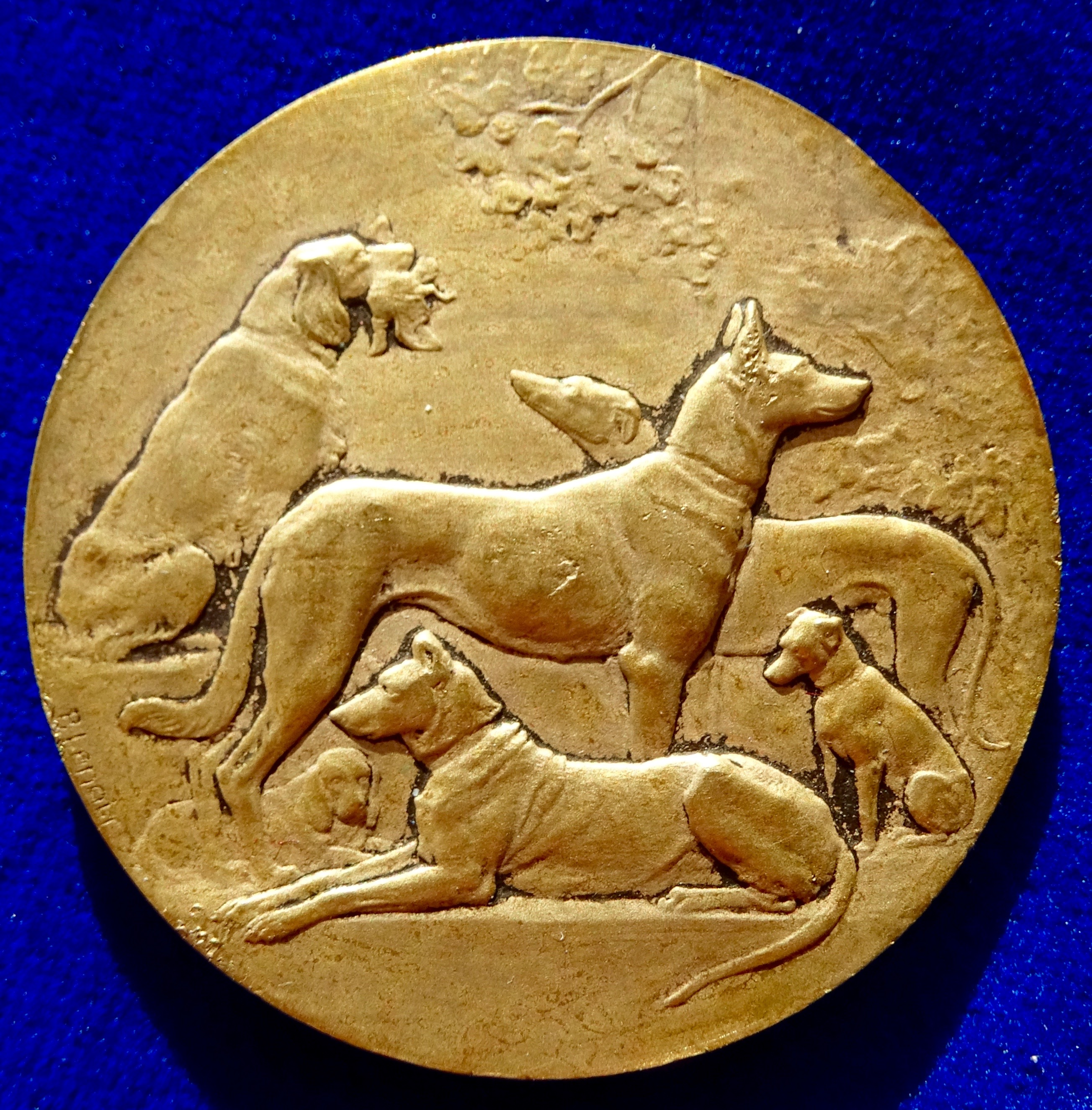
France. Canine commercial prize medal with 6 Dogs, obverse

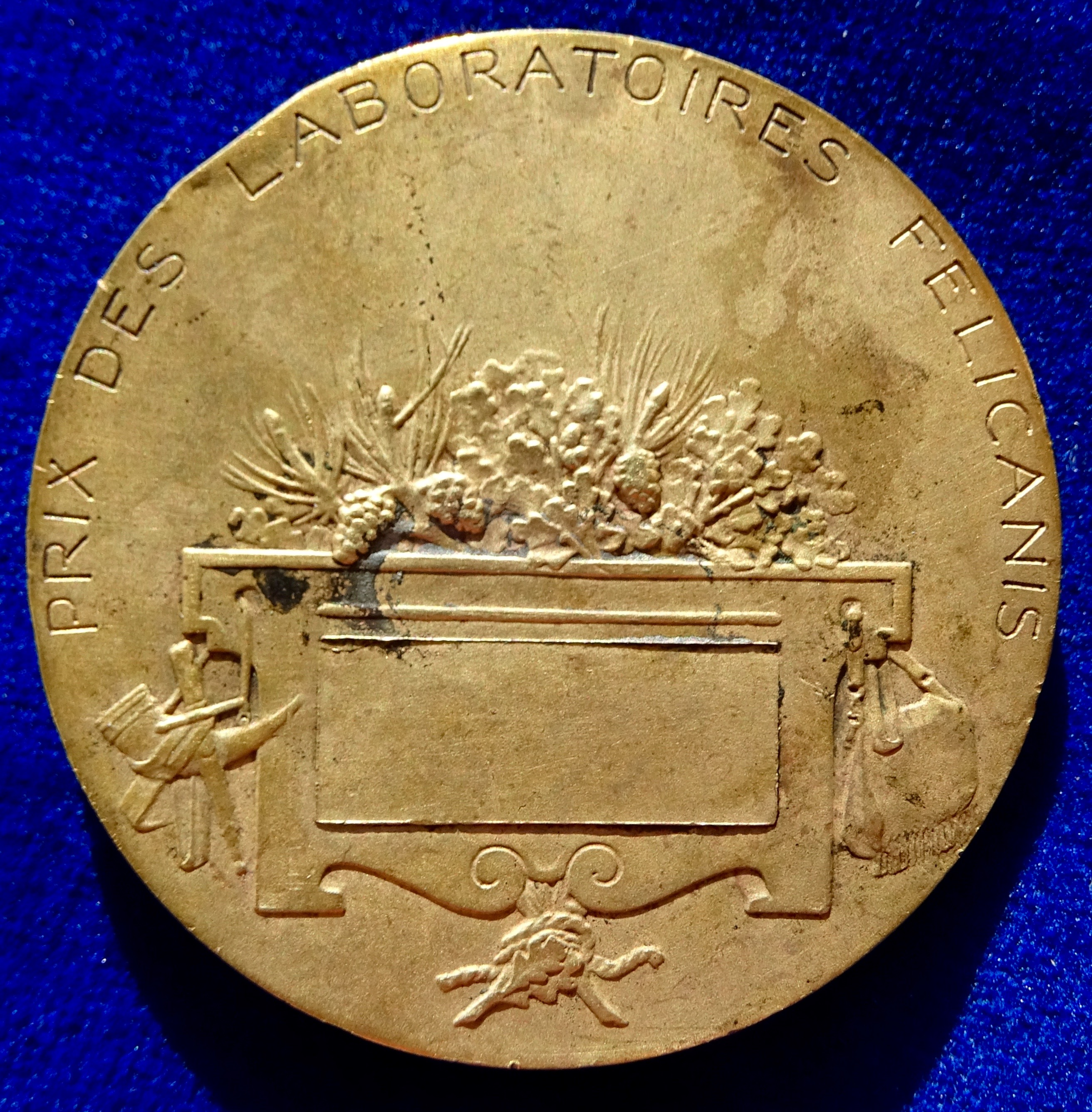
The reverse of this medal without engraving of a recipient

Lenoir created many medals and plaquettes.

== Other works ==
- "Woman smoking". This 1931 Lenoir bronze plaquette is held in the Victoria and Albert Museum. The museum states:
  "Art Deco medals and plaquettes reflected changes within society. Here a half-dressed woman smoking a cigarette suggests modernity and a hedonistic approach to life"
- Stendhal. This plaster bust is to be seen in Grenoble's mairie. A version in marble is located in Grenoble's "House of Stendahl".
- "Trois Fillettes". A bronze bas-relief in Rennes' Musée des beaux-arts.
- "Le Lait". A bas-relief in copper held in Rennes' Musée des beaux-arts.
- "Le Beurre". A bas-relief in copper. Held in Rennes' Musée des beaux-arts.
- "Les Laveuses". Another copper bas-relief in Rennes' Musée des beaux-arts.
- "Breton assis". This bronze study of a seated Breton is held in the Rennes Musée des beaux-arts.
- A bronze allegory:"La Municipalité Rennaise 1914". Held by Rennes Musée des beaux-arts. A plaque marking the 1914 inauguration of Rennes' town hall.
- Adolphe Beaufrere. This 1918 work is held in Rennes' Musée des beaux-arts. Beaufrere was a French painter and engraver.
- "La Pomme de Terre". A bas-relief held by Rennes' Musée des beaux-arts.
- "Femmes en Deuil". This study of women in mourning, a terracotta bas-relief held by Rennes' Musée des beaux-arts.
- "Femme assise". Bronze bas-relief on medallion held by Rennes' Musée des beaux-arts. Work dates to around 1919.
- "L'Ancêtre". This study of a Breton wearing a hat dates to around 1920. Held in Rennes' Musée des beaux-arts.
- "La Source". This statue stands in Clamart's Parc Maison Blanche.
- Richelieu. This work is held in Luçon's mairie.
- "Tête de Vieille Femme". A work in marble held in Rennes' Musée des beaux-arts.
- "Tête de Fillette". A 1929 work in marble.
- "Le Potier de la Poterie". Bronze bas-relief in Rennes' Musée des beaux-arts.
- Medallion depicting Charles Lenoir. Charles Lenoir was Pierre's father and this 1954 terracota commemorative medallion depicting Charles in bas-relief is held in the collection of the Rennes' musée des beaux-arts. Charles was an accomplished sculptor. Work in terracotta held by Rennes' Musée des beaux-arts.
- A "sacred heart" statue in Caniço in Madeira. Lenoir worked with fellow sculptor Georges Serraz on the sacred heart/Cristo Rei, Madeira statue in 1927 which is 14 metres high.
- Monument to Théodore Botrel. This 1928 monument is located in Paimpol's Place de Verdun. Botrel was a French singer-songwriter, poet and playwright. The monument involves a large piece of granite on which there is a bronze medallion depicting Botrel and on either side reliefs one of which depicts two women in Breton dress (La Paimpolaise gazing out to sea from the imaginary cliff) whilst the other depicts a group of three men. The monument was inaugurated on 15 July 1928. The words of the 1895 song "La Paimpolaise" are inscribed on the monument:
  "J'aile parfum de la Paimpolaise/Son église et son grand pardon/J’aime surtout la Paimpolaise/Qui m’attend au pays breton"
- Monument to Gabriel Vicaire. This monument to the French poet stands in Ploumanac'h's Rue des Carrières and on what is known as "La Roche des Poètes" and is a bronze plaque depicting Vicaire this fixed to a huge rock. It was in 1910 that the Perros-Guirec tourist office had the idea of devoting an area between La Clarté and Ploumanac'h in which to create a tribute to various "men of letters" who came from this part of Brittany. Apart from Lenoir's Vicaire, the writer Anatole Le Braz was remembered with a bronze portrait plaque the work being by the sculptor Armel-Beaufils and on a third rock Charles Le Goffic was honoured with a bronze portrait plaque by Louis Henri Nicot. The medallion of Gabriel Vicaire includes the representation of l'ajonc recalling Vicaires "Au Pays des Ajoncs" and the inscription "Gabriel Vicaire, 1848-1900".
- Memorial to the pupils of the Paris conservatoire. This 1927 plaster memorial to the pupils of the Paris conservatoire national de la musique who gave their lives in the 1914-1918 war is conserved in the Le Mans Mairie.
- "jeune fille à la sandale". This Lenoir sculpture stands in Bois-Colombes's square de l'Hôtel de Ville.
- "La Jeunesse". This marble bust of Madeleine Lenoir, the sculptor's daughter, is held by the Rennes Musée des beaux-arts.
- "La Rivière". This sculpture carved from Senozan stone can be seen in the Parthenay mairie.
