= Armel Beaufils =

French sculptor (1882–1952)

Émile Jean Armel-Beaufils
- Born: 1882; Rennes
- Died: 1952 (aged 69–70)
- Education: École régionale des beaux-arts de Rennes and École nationale supérieure des beaux-arts de Paris
- Occupations: Sculptor and maker of ceramic figures

Émile Jean Armel-Beaufils was a French sculptor born in Rennes in 1882 and who died in Saint-Briac in 1952.

== Biography ==
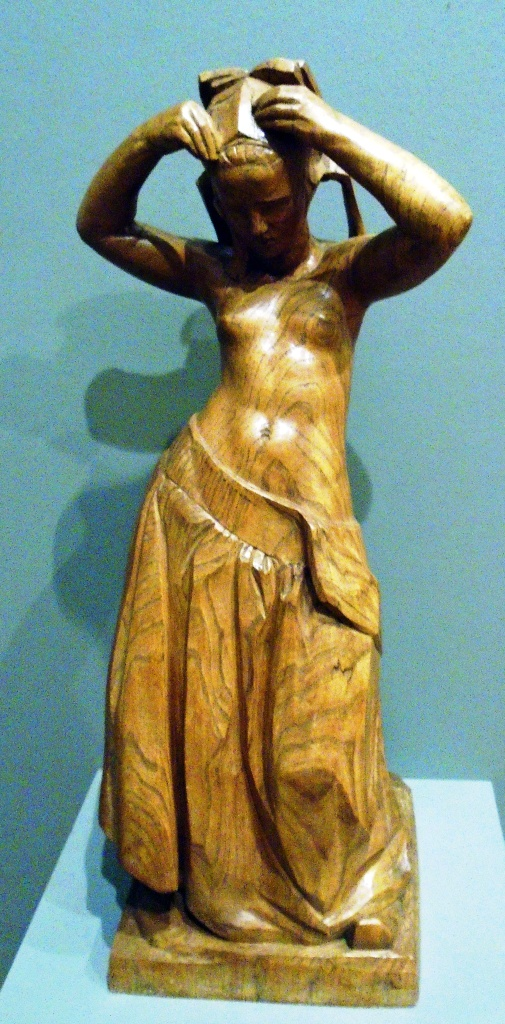
"Après le pardon" in the Musée des beaux-arts de Rennes

Émile Jean Armel-Beaufils started his schooling in Fougères then at a lycée in Rennes. He studied law and then literature but attended evening classes at the Rennes Ếcole des Beaux-Arts. He then attended the Rennes Ếcole des Beaux-Arts on a full-time basis from 1902 to 1905 moving then to the Ếcole nationale supérieure des Beaux-Arts in Paris where he studied under Luc-Olivier Merson, Antonin Mercié and Jules Jacques Labatut. On leaving art school he began to exhibit his work at the Salon des artistes français and in 1914 won their bronze medal. He was to be awarded a silver medal in 1921 and continued to exhibit every year until 1951. He was served with mobilization papers when war broke out in 1914, but then released on health grounds. Between 1917 and 1920 he worked on several war memorials in the Brittany region. Also, he worked on several commemorative memorials such as that to Anatole Le Braz in Perros-Guirec and to Aristide Briand in Saint-Briac. He also worked with the Henriot factory from 1929 onwards producing porcelain figures. With his wife and fellow sculptor Zannic Beaufils he spent much of his time in Saint-Briac-sur-Mer (Note: Zannic Beaufils was the name often used by Susanne Duvivier, Émile's partner and also an accomplished sculptor. Often they worked together on sculptures but she executed many without involving her husband. Many of these works are held in the Saint Briac-sur-Mer mairie including "Nativité", "Portrait de femme", "Sainte Barbe, "Vierge aux Roses", "Coiffe de Pont l'Abbé", "L'enfance de la Vierge", "Nicole", "Petite fille", "Sophinka", "Portrait de Jérôme Lallement" and "Tête de Bébé". She also worked on the tomb of the Dusuzeau family in Saint Briac-sur-Mer and a sculpture for her husband's grave.) Her best-known solo work is the granite monument in Saint-Brieuc entitled "Anatole Le Braz écoutant Marc'harit Fulup". Marc'harit Fulup was a Breton storyteller.

== Main works ==
Émile Jean Armel-Beaufils' main works are listed below.

=== Works in the Musée des beaux-arts de Rennes ===
This art gallery holds the following Armel-Beaufils works:-

"La Fée des grèves". This bronze dates to around 1942.

"Buste de jeune fille-Mademoiselle Lecourbe". A marble bust dating to 1932.

"Après le pardon". This statuette in wood dates to around 1942 and was purchased by the French State from the "Éxposition d'art régional breton" held in Rennes from 17 October 15 November 1942

"Le Procès de Jeanne d’Arc". This bronze statuette dates to 1942.

=== "Les rameaux" ===
This Armel-Beaufils marble work is held by the Rennes' Hôtel de la préfecture d'Ille-et-Vilaine

=== Works in the Saint-Briac-sur-Mer mairie ===
There are many Armel Beaufils works in the town hall at 18 rue de la Mairie in Saint-Briac-sur-Mer. These include:-

Work	Date	Notes	References
La danse	1936	Work in plaster said to be based on Irina Vinogradova.	
Le loup de Mer	1936	Work in plaster said to be based on Irina Vinogradova.	
Soizic jeune Ouessantine	1926		
Poilu pour le monument d'Anet	1921	A plaster model of the soldier to be used for the Anet war memorial.	
Hésitation		This work was presented to the Salon des Artistes Français in 1952.	
Enfant de Plougastel	1927		
Nu assis tête penchée		Date unknown.	
La Pennhérès, dit aussi L'héritière ou La fille unique		Work executed with his wife Zannic.	
Ange assis		An undated work.	

== Other works ==
=== "La conquête des connaissances universelles, ou Science et navigation" ===
This 1931 plaster relief was purchased by the French government for the main entrance to the then Merchant Navy (La Marine marchande) Ministry building at 3 place Fontenay in Paris and in 1933 another version was purchased for the new Hôtel de ville in Perros-Guirec where it can be seen in the "salle des conseils".

=== "Monument Victoria" ===
Located in Saint-Briac-sur-Mer's boulevard de la Mer, this 1937 bronze plaque by Armel Beaufils depicts the Russian aristocrat Victoria Melita (Princess Victoria Melita of Saxe-Coburg and Gotha), a friend of Jacques Nozal who lived in Saint-Briac-sur-Mer's villa des Emaux.

=== "Quimper ou Les Trois Bretonnes" ===
This plaster model dating to 1930 is held in Quimper's Musée des beaux-arts. In his composition Armel-Beaufils presents us with three faces of the region of Finistère showing the different types of caps worn by the women of the region. The woman to the left wears the cap worn in Plougastel-Daoulas, the woman to the right the cap worn in Rosporden and the woman in the centre the cap and neckwear of a woman in Bigouden. The work was for a proposed monument for Quimper railway station.

=== "Jeune Trégorroise en costume" ===
This statuette is held in the Perros-Guirec hôtel de ville. A woman in Breton costume carries a book in her left hand and a bunch of flowers. The work had been presented to the Perros-Guirec museum in 1936.

=== Monument to François-René de Chateaubriand ===
This 1948 monument with sculpture by Armel Beaufils stands on the old ramparts of Saint Malo, Chateaubriand's birthplace. It was erected to celebrate the centenary of Chateaubriand's death. Saint Malo is rich in sculpture and has works on public display by Francis Pellerin, André Bizette-Lindet, Eugène Dodeigne, Henri Chaumont, René Quillivic and many others. Armel-Beaufils had already of course worked on the Saint-Malo and Saint-Servan war memorials. The municipal library of Fougères hold the 1948 plaster maquettes of the statues of Velleda and Cymodocée which were intended to decorate the Chateaubriand monument but never used. There had been a bronze statue of Chateaubriand in Saint Malo by Aimé Millet dating back to 1875 but this had been dismantled by the occupying Germans in 1942 to satisfy their thirst for bronze to manufacture weaponry.

=== Saint-Briac-sur-Mer Post Office ===
The front of the post office has a relief by Armel Beaufils.

=== "Le Pardon" ===
This 1949 Armel Beaufils work in granite is located in Saint-Cast-le-Guildo at the Pointe du Loup and what is known as the "Oratoire Notre-Dame de la Garde". The oratory of Notre-Dame-de-la-Garde is dedicated to the people of Saint-Cast-le-Guildo who survived the bombings of August 1944 and the subsequent liberation. The statue of the Virgin Mary "Notre-Dame-de-la-Garde" on the top of the oratory is the work of Armel Beaufils and his wife Zannic.

=== "Promenade au Clair de Lune" Dinard ===
This public walkway in Dinard is decorated with various sculptures including busts of Paul Crolard and Jules Boutin and a 1937 bas-relief by Armel Beaufils entitled "Le débarquement de jean iv de bretagne en 1379".

=== Monument to Aristide Briand ===
The monument to Aristide Briand, originally known as the "Pierre du Souvenir", is located in Trébeurden. At the top of the monument there is an Armel-Beaufils medallion containing a bas-relief profile portrait of this French politician and below this a bronze sculpture of a young boy. The front of the monument carries the inscription

"Il voulut pour nous La Paix"

continued on the back

"Jamais je n'aurai eu cet idéal si je n'avais eu la foi du celte. A. Briand"

It was the left-liberal Breton faction "Les Bleus de Bretagne" who were behind the idea of setting up the monument and Trébeurden was chosen as Briand was a regular visitor to the resort from 1919 to 1928 and had a house there. The sculpture of the young man, entitled the "Gamin de Trébeurden" had been cast in bronze by the Paris founder H. Rouard and shown at the 1933 Paris salon before being used at Trébeurden.

=== "La dernière épingle" ===
This sculpture can be seen in the mairie of Tréguier.

=== "Torse de femme" ===
This 1922 Armel Beaufils marble sculpture is held in the Paris Sénat.

=== "Jeune femme" ===
A work in marble dating to 1912 and held in the Ministère de l'éducation nationale, de la recherche et de la technologie in Paris.

=== "paysanne du Trégor" ===
This 1932 sculpture can be seen in the Perros-Guirec mairie.

=== "La paysanne et le paysan de Pontivy" ===
Two sculptures can be seen in Pontivy at the junction of the Avenue Napoléon I and the Boulevard Alsace-Lorraine. One is by Émile Armel-Beaufils and depicts a Pontivy woman whilst René Quillivic has sculpted a Pontivy man. Both wear regional dress and Quillivic's work is called "Le Mouton Blanc".

=== Monument to Anatole Le Braz ===
This monument stands in Perros-Guirec's rue Gabriel-Vicaire and is what is known as "La Roche des Poètes" and there is a bronze plaque depicting Anatole Le Braz attached to a huge rock. The idea was born in 1910 and the Perros-Guirec tourist office had the idea of devoting an area between La Clarté and Ploumanac'h to contain a tribute to "men of letters" who came from this part of Brittany and the tribute to the writer Anatole Le Braz was Émile Jean Armel-Beaufils's contribution. There are three medallions attached to the rock, that depict Anatole Le Braz and two others, a portrait of the poet Gabriel Vicaire by Pierre Charles Lenoir and of Charles Le Goffic by Louis Henri Nicot.

== War memorials ==
Brittany lost some 240,000 men killed in the 1914-1918 war and every family and every commune was touched by that war and as was the case throughout France there was a hunger to mark these losses with some form of memorial. Those left behind felt it a duty to honour those lost in some tangible form. In November 1919 the association "La Bretagne artistique" sent a circular to all Breton Hotel de ville promising their cooperation in creating sculptural decoration for the erected memorials.

Location		Notes	Ref.
Saint-Briac-sur-Mer	48.618828°N 2.133908°W	This memorial stands in the rue du Nord and is inscribed "aux enfants de Saint-Briac morts pour la France". A granite pillar has two bas-reliefs by Armel-Beaufils. One depicts in profile the heads of a soldier and a sailor and the second a young Breton girl on her knees grieving the dead.	
Fougères	48.354361°N 1.201804°W	Armel-Beaufils' memorial to the dead of the 1914-18 war stands in Fougères' Place Aristide Briand and dates to 1920. The memorial comprises a menhir with Armel-Beaufils bronze sculptures standing on either side. One of the bronzes depicts a woman in mourning. She is an allegory for France and carries a wreath of laurel, the symbol of immortality, and holds a shield bearing the coat of arms of Fougères. The other bronze depicts a boy writing on the menhir the words "A mes Ainés qui ont combattu pour moi". The boy holds a Breton hat and wears a shoemaker's apron. Thus Armel-Beaufils, by depicting a widow and a child reminds us of the two sections of society left to mourn those taken by the war and by centering his composition around a menhir, Armel-Beaufils puts such losses into the context of Brittany. The names of the dead are listed below the menhir. 710 men of Fougères lost their lives in the 1914-1918 war. The inauguration took place on 10 October 1920.	
Rosporden	47.959653°N 3.827144°W	Armel Beaufils executed the sculpture of a soldier which is part of this memorial inaugurated on 12 November 1922. The same sculpture can be seen on the war memorial at Anet and the plaster model is held in Saint-Briac-sur-Mer's Mairie.	
Saint-Malo	48.650036°N 2.026252°W	This granite memorial dates to 1923 and stands in Saint Malo's Enclos de la Résistance. Armel Beaufils sculpted a relief depicting the heads of a soldier and a sailor and this is placed at the very top of the monument whilst Armel Beaufils' statue of a widow and her son stand to the side of the monument. The inscription reads "aux enfants de saint-malo morts pour la france 1914 - 1918".	
Saint-Servan	48.635229°N 2.015485°W	This 1922 war memorial is nearby Saint Malo and stands at the intersection of the boulevard Porée and the boulevard Gouazon and in front of the parc Bel Air. Since 1967 Saint-Servan-sur-Mer has in fact been merged with the commune of Saint-Malo. On the monument there is a bas-relief profile of a soldier and a sailor, as with Saint Malo, and a widow in mourning clothes stands in front of the monument with her head bowed. The Croix de Guerre is carved above the bas-relief profile. On either side of the main monument are two black marble stones listing the names of those honoured. 353 men were killed in the two World Wars.	
Saint-Cast-le-Guildo		In Armel-Beaufils' composition, a woman in Breton dress stands next to a pedestal listing the names of the men of Saint-Cast-le-Guildo killed in the two World Wars.	
Ploaré	48.087770°N 4.324530°W	This 1922 war memorial stands at the entrance to Ploaré's cemetery. It comprises an elaborate archway and Armel-Beaufils sculpted a bas-relief profile of a young girl in mourning which is fixed to the central support of the arch. 122 men of Ploaré were killed in the 1914-1918 war.	

=== Monument celebrating the liberation of Saint-Briac-sur-Mer in 1944 ===
Armel-Beaufils decorates the memorial with a bronze medallion of a helmeted "GI" in profile. The liberation of Saint-Briac-sur-Mer by the Americans in August 1944 is celebrated.

== Funerary sculpture ==
Armel-Beaufils' work included the following works of a funerary nature:-

Work	Date	Notes	Ref.
The tomb of Jean V de Bretagne in Tréguier cathedral		Armel Beaufils executed a sculptural decoration for this tomb.	
The tomb of Maxime Bunel		This tomb is located in Lohéac and has a bronze medallion depicting Bunel sculpted by Armel Beaufils.	
Statuette for the tomb of Paul Grandhomme	1934	The bronze statuette involved was executed by Armel-Beaufils and his wife Zannic Armel-Beaufils and decorates Grandhomme's tomb in Saint-Briac-sur-Mer's cemetery. The plaster version from which the bronze was cast can be seen in Saint-Briac's mairie.	

== Literature ==
- Prevel, Corinne, La démarche régionaliste d'Armel Beaufils, in: Delouche Denise. La création bretonne 1900-1940. Arts de l'Ouest. Rennes : P.U.R., 1995, p. 81-92.
- Dressaye, Catherine, Devaux, Anne-Louise and Yves (dir.). Armel et Zannic Beaufils. Saint-Briac-sur-Mer : Association Namasté, 1996.
