= André Suarès =

French poet and critic

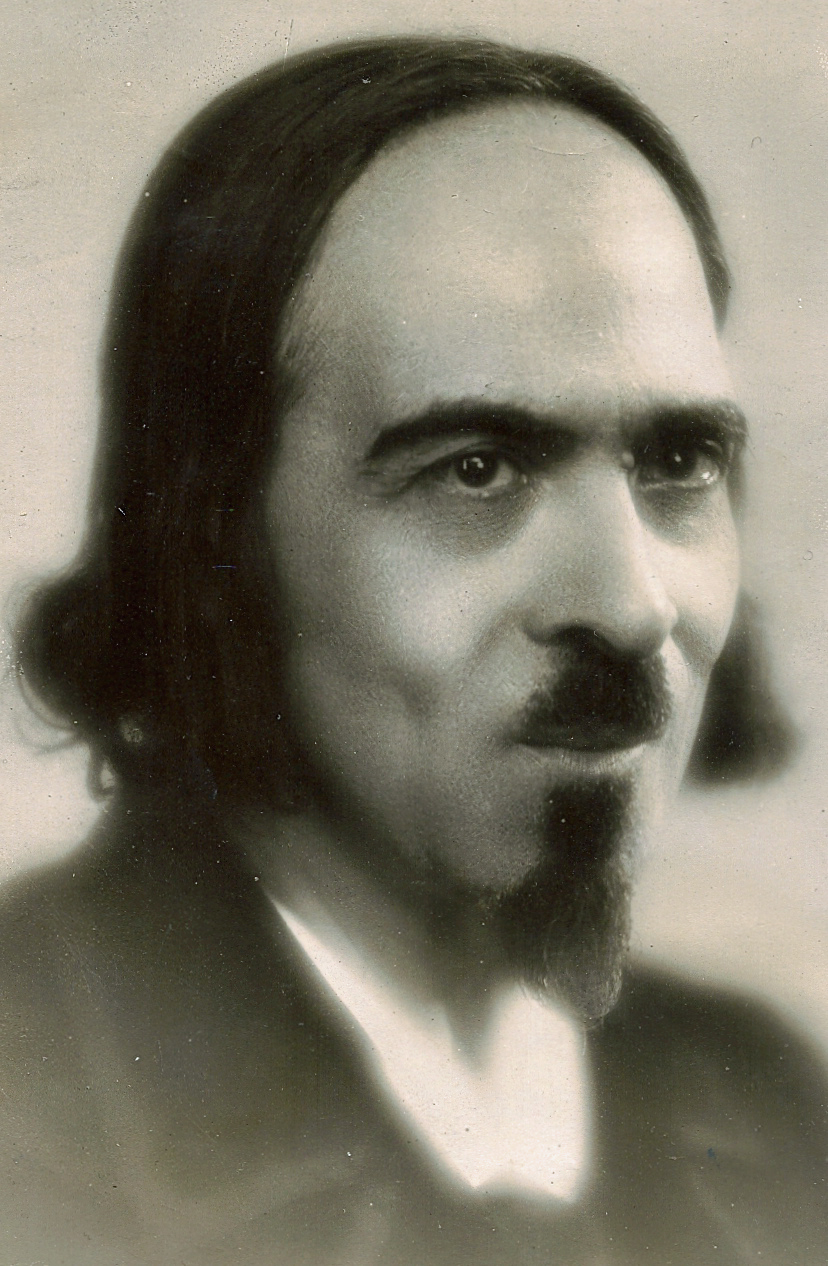
- Born: Isaac Félix Suarès; 12 June 1868; Marseille, Bouches-du-Rhône, France
- Died: 7 September 1948 (aged 80); Saint-Maur-des-Fossés, Val-de-Marne, France
- Occupations: Poet, critic

André Suarès, born Isaac Félix Suarès (12 June 1868, Marseille – 7 September 1948, Saint-Maur-des-Fossés) was a French poet and critic.

From 1912 onwards, he was one of the four "pillars" of the Nouvelle Revue Française, along with André Gide, Paul Claudel and Paul Valéry.

In 1931, he contributed to a book entitled Marsiho. In this work, written in Paris, he revealed his true feelings about his hometown (Marseille).

André Suarès died in 1948, aged 80.

== Bibliography ==
=== Literature ===
- Lettres d'un solitaire sur les maux du Temps (1899)
- Images de la grandeur (1901)
- Le Livre de l'émeraude (1902)
- Sur la mort de mon frère (1904)
- Xénies (1923)
- Saint-Juin de la Primevère (1926)
- Clowns (1927)
- Marsiho (1931)
- Cirque (1932)
- Le Voyage du condottière (1932)
- Cité, nef de Paris (1933)
- Le Crépuscule sur la mer (1933), réédition partielle du Livre de l'émeraude
- Temples grecs, maisons des Dieux (1937)
- Cantique des cantiques (1938)
- Passion (1939)
- Paris (1950), posthume
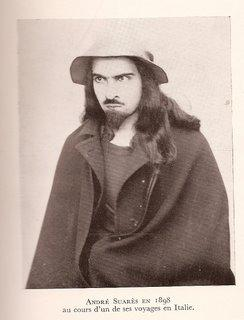
- André Suarès in 1898
  Rosalinde sur l'eau (1950), posthume
- Le Paraclet (1976), posthume
- Vita-Nova (1977), posthume
- Talisman d'Avila (1980), posthume
- Ce Monde doux-amer (1980), posthume
- Don Juan (1987), posthume
- Landes et marines (1991), posthume
- Provence (1993), posthume
- Rome (1998), posthume

=== Poetry ===
- Éloge d'Homère par Ronsard (1886)
- Airs (1900)
- Bouclier du zodiaque (1907)
- Lais et sônes (1909)
- Amour (1917)
- Sous le pont de la Lune (1925)
- Haïkaï de l'occident (1926)
- Soleil de Jade (1928)
- Poèmes du temps qui meurt (1929)
- Rêves de l'ombre (1937)
- Antiennes du Paraclet (1976), posthume
- Caprices (1977), posthume
- Poétique (1980), posthume

=== Theater ===
- Les Pèlerins d'Emmaüs (1893)
- La Tragédie d'Élektre et Oreste (1905)
- Cressida (1913)
- Les bourdons sont en fleur (1917)
- Polyxène (1925)
- Hélène chez Archimède (1949), posthume
- Minos et Parsiphaé (1950), posthume
- Ellys et Thanatos (1978), posthume
- Vues critiques
- Tolstoï (1899)
- Wagner (1899)
- Le portrait d'Ibsen (1908)
- Visite à Pascal (1909)
- Tolstoï vivant (1911) - réédition enrichie de l'édition de 1899
- Dostoïevski (1911)
- Trois Hommes : Pascal, Ibsen, Dostoïevski (1913)
- François Villon (1914)
- Chroniques de Caërdal : Portraits (1914)
- Péguy (1915)
- Cervantès (1916)
- Poète tragique : portrait de Prospero - sur Shakespeare (1921)
- La Bièvre, Delvau, Huysmans, Mithouard (1922)
- Puissance de Pascal (1923)
- Stendhal, Verlaine, Baudelaire, Gérard de Nerval et autres gueux (1923)
- Goethe le grand Européen (1932)
- Portraits sans modèle (1935)
- Trois Grands Vivants, Cervantès, Tolstoï, Baudelaire (1937)

=== Essais et pamphlets ===
- Chroniques du Lieutenant X (1900)
- Voici l'homme, (1906)
- Sur la vie Tome I (1909), Tome II (1910), Tome III (1912)
- De Napoléon (1912)
- Idées et Visions (1913)
- Chroniques de Caërdal : Essais (1913)
- Commentaires sur la guerre des boches : Tome I, Nous et eux (1915), Tome II, C'est la guerre (1915), Tome III Occident (1915), Tome IV, La nation contre la race, la fourmilière (1916), Tome V La nation contre la race, République et barbares (1916)
- Remarques (1917–18)
- Tombeau de Jean Letellier, un jeune soldat de la grande guerre (1920)
- Debussy (1922)
- Présences (1925)
- Musique et poésie (1928)
- Variables, (1929)
- Le martyre de Saint-Augustin (1929)
- Musiciens (1931)
- Vues sur Napoléon (1933)
- Vues sur l'Europe (1936)
- Valeurs, (1936)
- Remarques
- Présentations de la France 1940-44 (1951), posthume
- Pour un portrait de Goya (1983), posthume
- Âmes et visages (1989), posthume
- Portraits et préférences (1991), posthume
- Idéées et visions (2002), posthume - anthologie coll. Bouquins Tome I
- Valeurs (2002), posthume - anthologie coll. Bouquins Tome II

=== Letters ===
- Correspondence avec Paul Claudel (1951)
- Correspondance avec Romain Rolland (1954)
- Ignorées du destinataire (1955)
- Correspondance avec Antoine Bourdelle (1961)
- Correspondance avec Charles Péguy (1961)
- Correspondance avec André Gide (1963)
- Correspondance avec Georges Rouault (1969)
- Correspondance avec Jacques Copeau (1982)
- L'art et la vie, correspondances diverses (1984)
- Correspondance avec Yves Le Febvre (1986)
- Correspondance avec Jean Paulhan (1987)
- Le Condottière et le Magicien, correspondance avec Jacques Doucet (1994)

This article was translated from the French Wikipedia
