= Bleus de Bretagne =

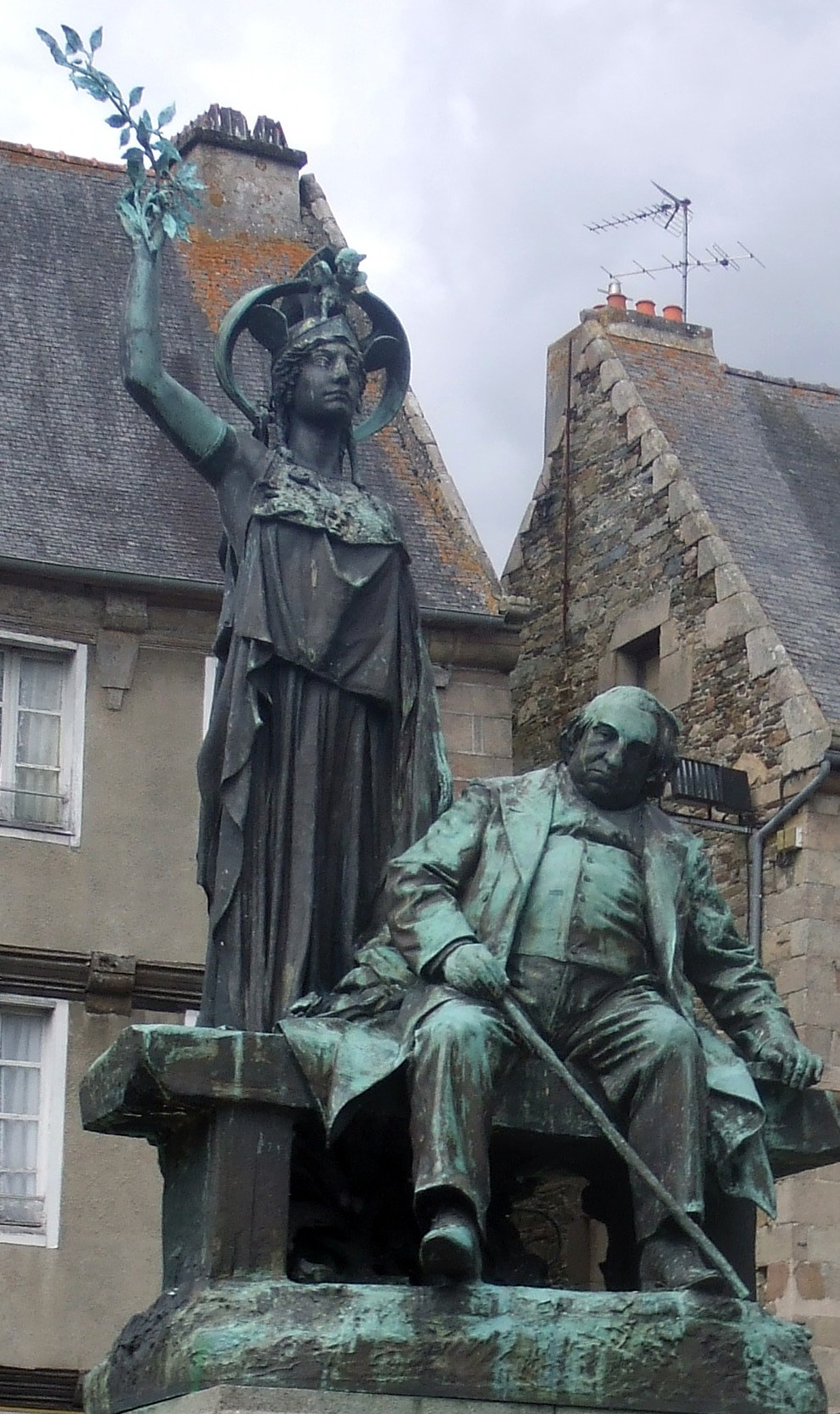
Statue of Ernest Renan, put up by the Bleus de Bretagne

The Ligue des bleus de Bretagne (League of Breton Blues) was a liberal organisation in Brittany founded in 1899, dedicated to promoting the ideals of the Enlightenment and the French Revolution in Brittany, and combating the influence of the aristocracy and clergy. The colour blue was chosen to contrast with the conservative "whites" and to emphasise their distinction from the Communist "reds". The term dates back to the Revolt in the Vendée when the counter-revolutionary Whites called the troops of the revolutionary government "the blues" (because of their uniforms).

The organisation arose from the Bretons de Paris, established by Armand Dayot and Ary Renan (son of Ernest Renan). It grew in Brittany from dissatisfaction with the conservative and clerical bias of the existing Breton Regionalist Union, founded a few months earlier. It was centred in the French-speaking east of Brittany and was strongest among the urban middle-class of the larger east-Breton towns. However it established branches throughout Brittany.

It included a number of influential writers, artists and politicians. Notable members were Yves Le Febvre, Jean Boucher, Armel Beaufils, Anatole Le Braz, Pierre-Paul Guieysse and Jean-Bertrand Pégot-Ogier. The organisation worked to emphasise modernity and French identity, in contrast to the emphasis being placed by some Breton nationalists on the traditional Breton peasant Catholic culture and the preservation of the Breton language. The group promoted the commemoration of liberal and revolutionary heroes, organizing the creation of statues of Lazare Hoche in Quiberon and Ernest Renan in Tréguier.

After 1905 its activity shifted to annual congresses, held across the major Breton towns. It also published the journal Araok!: La Bretagne Nouvelle (Forward!: the New Brittany).
