= Ary Renan =

French painter (1857–1900)

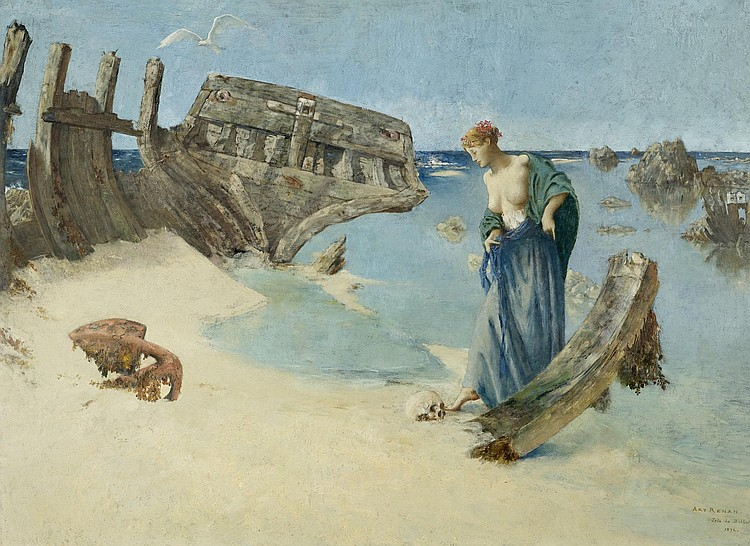
Jeune fille contemplant un Crâne près d'un Bateau naufragé au Bord de la Mer - Ile de Bréhat (1892) by Ary Renan

Cornelius Ary Renan (1857 – 4 August 1900) was a French Symbolist painter and anti-clerical social activist.

== Career ==
Renan was the son of the Breton scholar Ernest Renan, who pioneered modern secular study of the life of Jesus. His mother was the daughter of painter Hendrik Scheffer and the niece of painter Ary Scheffer, after whom he was named. Renan followed his grandfather and great-uncle into a career as an artist, becoming associated with the Symbolist movement. He studied with Elie Delaunay and Pierre Puvis de Chavannes (a one time student of his grandfather). He also became a close friend of Gustave Moreau.

Ary Renan travelled widely, to Asia and Algeria, while having a physical disability. He also spent a lot of time in Brittany. He exhibited work from 1880. His works are influenced by his travels and by Symbolist poetry.

The Musée de la Vie Romantique in Paris holds a significant number of his works. His Symbolist masterwork The Diver – The Coral Fisherman dating to 1882, was purchased by the Columbus Museum of Art in Ohio in 2014.

He died on 4 August 1900.

== Political activity ==
Renan followed his father as a leader of the secularist movement in Brittany. He co-founded the organisation Bretons de Paris, along with Armand Dayot. It evolved into the Ligue des bleus de Bretagne which grew in Brittany from dissatisfaction with the conservative and clerical bias of the existing Breton Regionalist Union, founded a few months earlier. However, Renan died shortly after its foundation.

== Sources ==
- "Renan, (Cornelis-)Ary". Grove Art Online. 2003.
