= Febvre =

Febvre resp. Le Febvre is a French surname. Notable people with the surname include:

- Antoine Lefèbvre de La Barre (1622–1688), Governor of New France from 1682 to 1685
- Frédéric Febvre (1835–1916), French actor
- Yves Le Febvre (1874-1959), leftist and anticlerical Breton writer and politician
- Lucien Febvre (1878-1956), French historian and encyclopaedist
- Romain Febvre (born 1991), French professional motocross racer

== See also ==
- Nicasius le Febure
