= Jean-Bertrand Pégot-Ogier =

French painter and cyclist

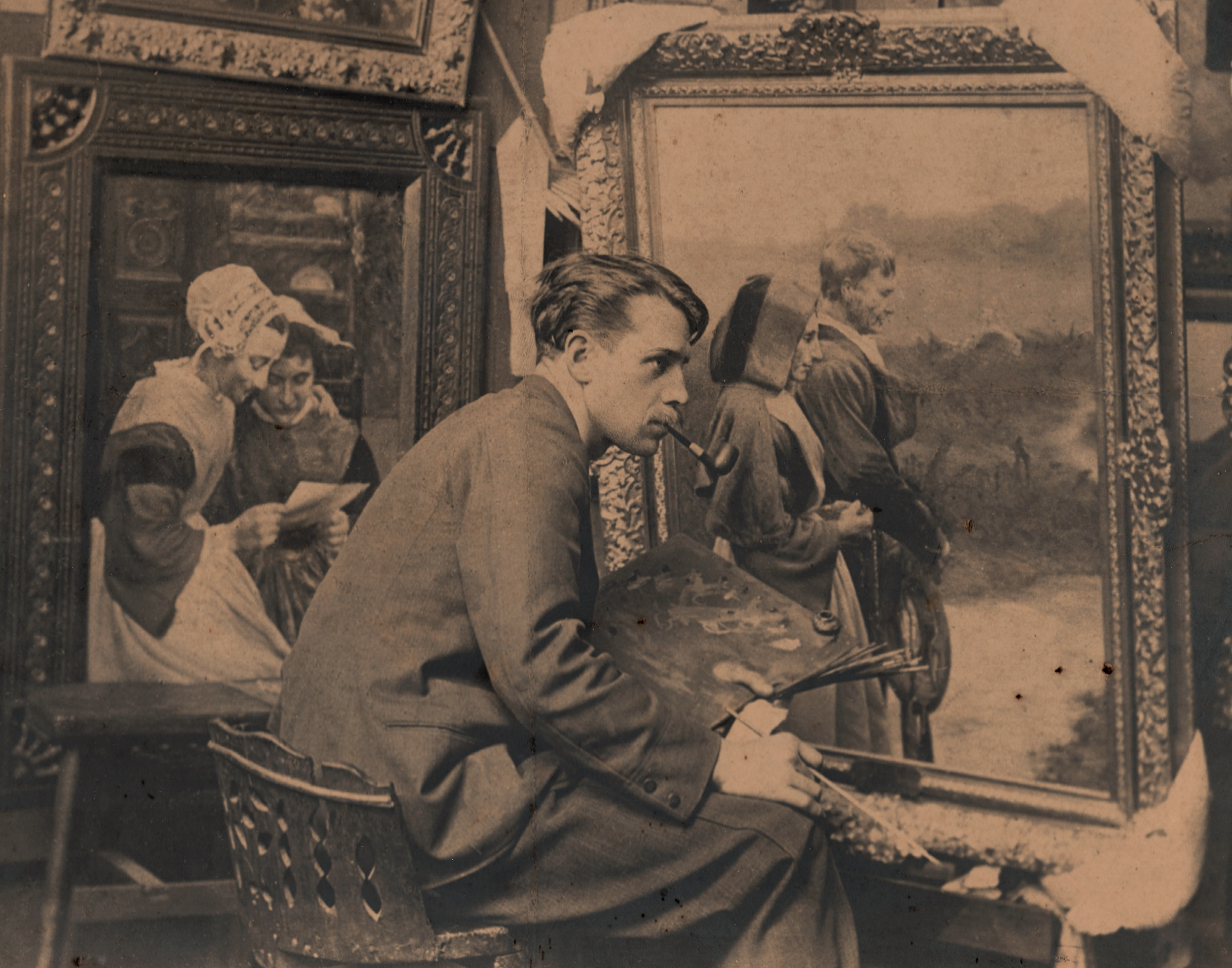
- Jean-Bertrand Pégot-Ogier in his studio, circa 1903
- Born: 7 May 1877; Salamanca, Spain
- Died: 2 October 1915 (aged 38); Moulin-sous-Touvent, Oise, France
- Occupations: Painter, engraver, illustrator, photographer, writer and cyclist

Jean-Bertrand Pégot-Ogier, or Jean-Bertrand Alexis Pégot-Ogier, sometimes shortened to Jean Pégot-Ogier, and known as Jean Pégot as an athlete (French: [ʒɑ̃ bɛʁtʁɑ̃ peɡo ɔʒje]; 7 May 1877 – 2 October 1915), was a Spanish-born French painter, engraver, illustrator, photographer, writer and road cyclist.

== Biography ==
Jean-Bertrand Pégot-Ogier's grandfather, Jean-Baptiste Pégot-Ogier, was Commissioner of the Republic in the Gers and a deputy for Haute-Garonne from 23 April 1848 to 26 May 1849. He subsequently became a determined opponent of the 1851 French coup d'état by Louis-Napoleon Bonaparte. This led to his being proscribed and going into exile in Spain.

Jean-Bertrand's father, Eugène Pégot-Ogier, was a writer, businessman, banker, traveller, publisher, journalist, polyglot, photographer, amateur painter, collector and scholar. He belonged to the circle of intellectuals around Victor Hugo during Hugo's exile in Guernsey. Eugène married, as his second wife in 1877, Jean Airlie Euphenia Géraldine Fitzgerald, born in Hastings, England, the daughter of a marshal and, through her mother, the great-granddaughter of a Scottish lord. They had two sons, Jean-Bertrand, born in Salamanca on 7 May 1877, and Ferdinand, born on Jersey on 17 November 1878.

Around 1879, the Pégot-Ogier couple acquired a property in Hennebont, the Belle-Vue or Bellevue villa, called the "Château de Bellevue" by Eugène Pégot-Ogier.

The Pégot-Ogier couple educated their children in science and the arts, particularly music and painting, as well as photography and literature. The house and its surrounding gardens had a view of the banks of the Blavet.

Jean-Bertrand and Ferdinand Pégot-Ogier studied in Hennebont and at the lycée in Lorient, where they obtained their baccalaureate.

Jean-Bertrand trained as a painter under his father. He received a bourgeois education, and the family property of Belle-Vue or Bellevue became a refuge for idealists and the well-to-do society of the area.

The death of his father in 1895 forced Jean-Bertrand to work more systematically, and he subsequently became involved with the École de Concarneau.

On 30 May 1902, his mother, Géraldine Fitzgerald, died at 52, leaving Jean-Bertrand distraught and revealing his hypersensitive character tinged with pessimism. This sudden solitude led him to reflect on his personal and artistic abilities. It was at this time that he took on a pupil who would remain his friend, Pierre Bertrand.

During the summer of 1903, Pégot-Ogier met Marie Joséphine Ross, a young musician on holiday in Doëlan. She was 15, and they married civilly in Montrouge on 26 December 1905.

As a candidate for the 265th Infantry Regiment, Jean-Bertrand Pégot-Ogier was killed on 2 October 1915 at the front at Attichy in the Oise.

=== Painter ===
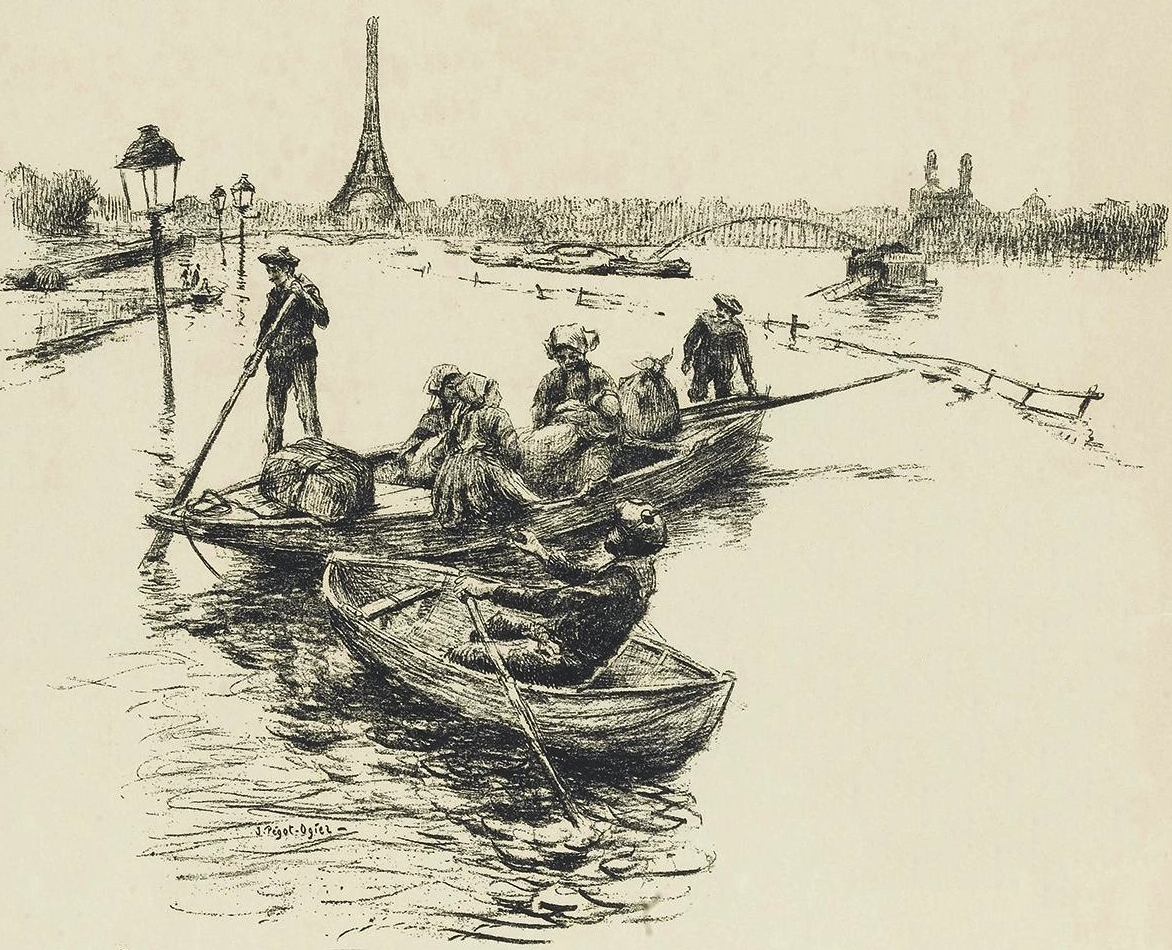
Souvenir des inondations de Paris 1910, lithograph, Marseille, Musée des Civilisations de l'Europe et de la Méditerranée.

While on holiday in Concarneau, he met two folklorists, Théophile Deyrolle and Alfred Guillou, the inspirations behind the École de Concarneau, who awakened in him a sensitivity to Brittany and taught him.

He began painting during stays on the island of Groix.

In 1900, he exhibited in Paris at the Salon des artistes français, with the support of Alfred Guillou and Théophile Deyrolle. He became a member of the Société des artistes français. In 1901, he again exhibited in Paris at the Salon des artistes français.

In 1904, he exhibited two works in Nantes. He also went to Port-Blanc with his brother Ferdinand at the invitation of Anatole Le Braz. He was a member of the association des bleus de Bretagne. In 1905, he exhibited two works in Rennes.

He divided his time between Hennebont and Paris. He became an artistic contributor to the newspaper Le Breton de Paris, secretary of the Association des Morbihannais de Paris, and subsequently secretary of the Fédération des Bretons de Paris.

His works were strongly inspired by Brittany. He was part of the École de Concarneau and established a drawing school in Lorient. He stayed several times in Le Faouët, where he made several paintings and, moved by the deterioration of the Saint-Fiacre chapel and its rood screen, published articles in Le Breton de Paris to alert the authorities.

He married Marie-Joséphine Ross on 26 December 1905 in Montrouge. She was a pianist of Austrian origin and a student at the Conservatoire de Paris. In his correspondence with his friends, including Pierre Bertrand, and in the titles of some works, she was always nicknamed "le Lippon". The marriage, which was solely civil, and the foreign origin of his wife were poorly accepted by some inhabitants of Hennebont, to the point that he returned there increasingly rarely.

In 1907, he organized a major exhibition in Lorient under the patronage of the Sauveteurs bretons and the Navy. In March 1908, the Société lorientaise des beaux-arts was founded, and he became its vice-president. That same month, needing money urgently to satisfy his creditors, he opened a drawing and painting class on Rue Renan in Lorient; but, because of an insufficient number of students, he had to close it a few months later.

In August 1909, he sold all the furniture from his Belle-Vue house in Hennebont in the hope of improving his financial situation and had his entire studio sent to Paris. He found a tenant in October. The same year, he held an exhibition in Cologne, Germany.

From 1910 onward, the couple experienced financial difficulties, leading them to sell two paintings by Paul Gauguin that Gauguin had given them.

Pégot-Ogier's painting was marked at times by Impressionism and at other times by Synthetism.

Thanks to the research by Marie-Christine Train, conducted in 1990, under the direction of Denise Delouche, which led to the rediscovery of the painter (whose work had been somewhat forgotten since the 1930s), an exhibition was organized at the Musée de Pont-Aven from 26 June to 27 September 1993. This led to the publication of a catalogue, Jean Pégot-Ogier 1877–1915, which had illustrations of around fifty works.

Six works were presented in the exhibition L'âge d'or de la peinture en Bretagne at the Musée de la Cohue in Vannes, from 23 June to 28 October 2001, including the diptych Matin de pardon and Soir de pardon, belonging to the collection of the City of Lorient. These two paintings, purchased directly from the painter in 1907, are characteristic of the artist's synthetist style, with areas of pure colour, simplified and refined forms outlined by a black or dark-blue line, directly inspired by the principles developed by Paul Gauguin, Émile Bernard, Paul Sérusier and their friends of the Pont-Aven school.

Other works, such as Rentrée des bateaux. Étude à Douëlan [sic] from 1895, the earliest known painting by the artist, or Le Ramassage du goémon à Doëlan, in which a fragmented and divided brushstroke made up of small, elongated, parallel and oblique strokes can be observed, were strongly inspired by the work of Henry Moret (1856–1913), whom Pégot-Ogier considered one of his masters. These paintings illustrate his association with the post-impressionist movement.

A painting by Pégot-Ogier was included in the major 2003 exhibition L'aventure de Pont-Aven et Gauguin, organized for the centenary of the death of Paul Gauguin at the Musée du Luxembourg in Paris and subsequently at the Musée des Beaux-Arts de Quimper.

The Musée du Faouët, in Morbihan, devoted a major retrospective exhibition to Pégot-Ogier from 27 June to 11 October 2015, to revive his work and honour his memory on the centenary of his death. More than 130 works, including oils, gouaches and drawings, were presented to the public. A catalogue was published for the occasion, Jean-Bertrand Pégot-Ogier 1877–1915, by Liv'Éditions and the two authors Jean-Marc Michaud and Christian Bellec. A first digital version of a catalogue raisonné, listing 570 works, including oils on all supports and works on paper, was produced by Bellec with the agreement of the artist's heirs.

The journal of the Société d'études de Brest et du Léon, Les Cahiers de l'Iroise, published a long article at the end of 2015, "Jean-Bertrand Pégot-Ogier : un illustrateur oublié".

=== Photographer ===
From 1902, disappointed by the image of a picturesque Brittany emptied of its soul, Pégot-Ogier broke with the École de Concarneau and isolated himself. He somewhat abandoned painting in favour of photography and cycling.

=== Cyclist ===
Pégot-Ogier was also a prominent athlete. In 1904 he was a controller for a gymnastics society in Hennebont and was a cycling champion.

At the end of the 1890s, he competed in bicycle races.

On 4 September 1898, he took part in Châteaulin in the two traditional races of the local patronal festival: the first was a 9 km race on the road to Quimper, with nine riders at the start, and the second a 5 km race on the road to Port-Launay, organized by the UVB, Union vélocipédique bretonne, which constituted the official Brittany road championship.

The races were:

- First race classification: 1st Gaby (Rennes), 2nd Henri Auffret (Brest), 3rd Jean Pégot (Lorient), 4th Léon Rannou (Le Faou).
- Second race classification: 1st Jean Pégot (Lorient), 2nd Léon Rannou (Le Faou) and Henri Auffret (Brest), tied. J.-B. Pégot-Ogier thus became the official Brittany road champion for 1898.

In 1899, he won races in Auray and continued to compete in cycling for several seasons.

== Works ==
=== Paintings ===
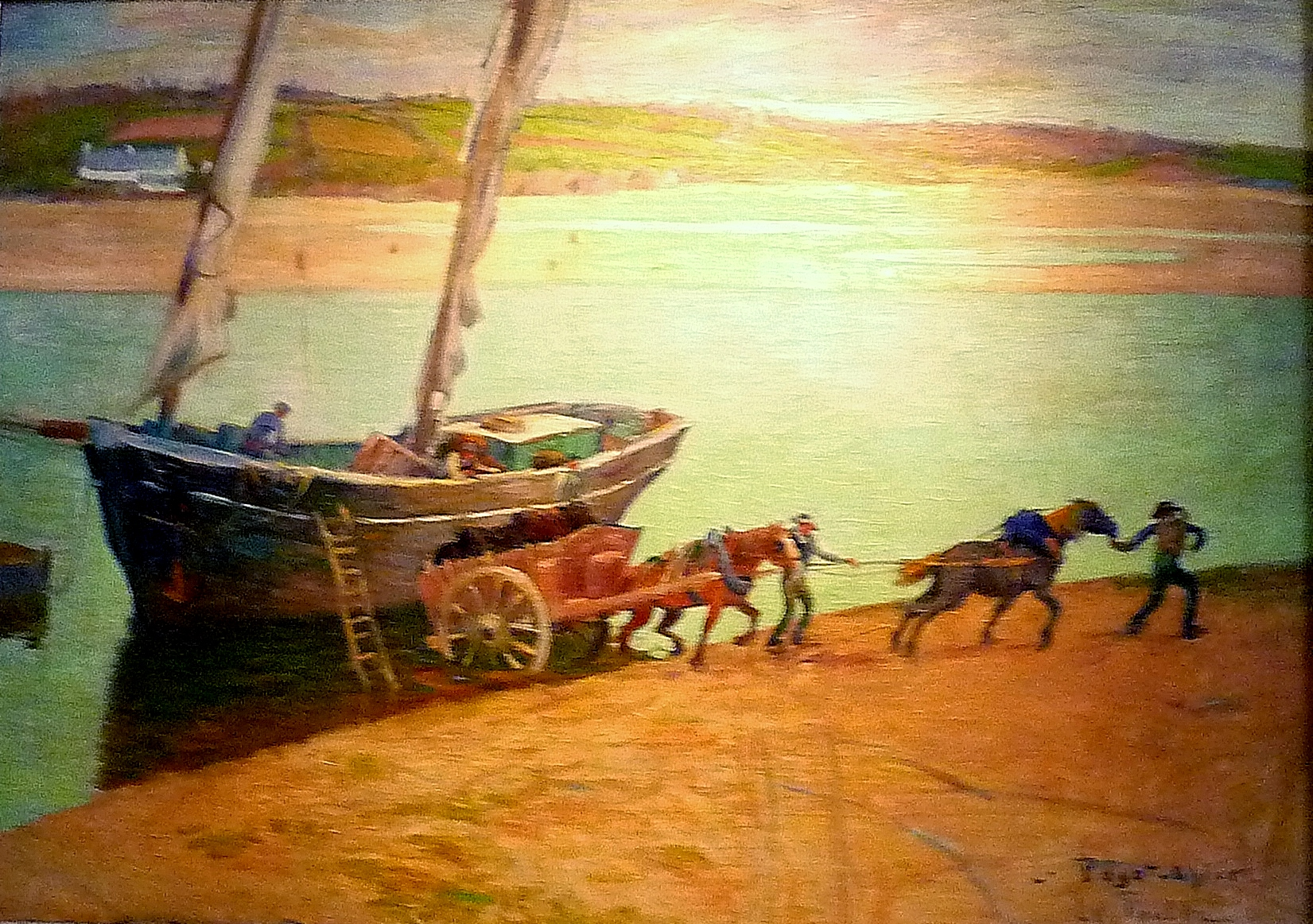
Chasse-marée au Pouldu (attribution), location unknown.

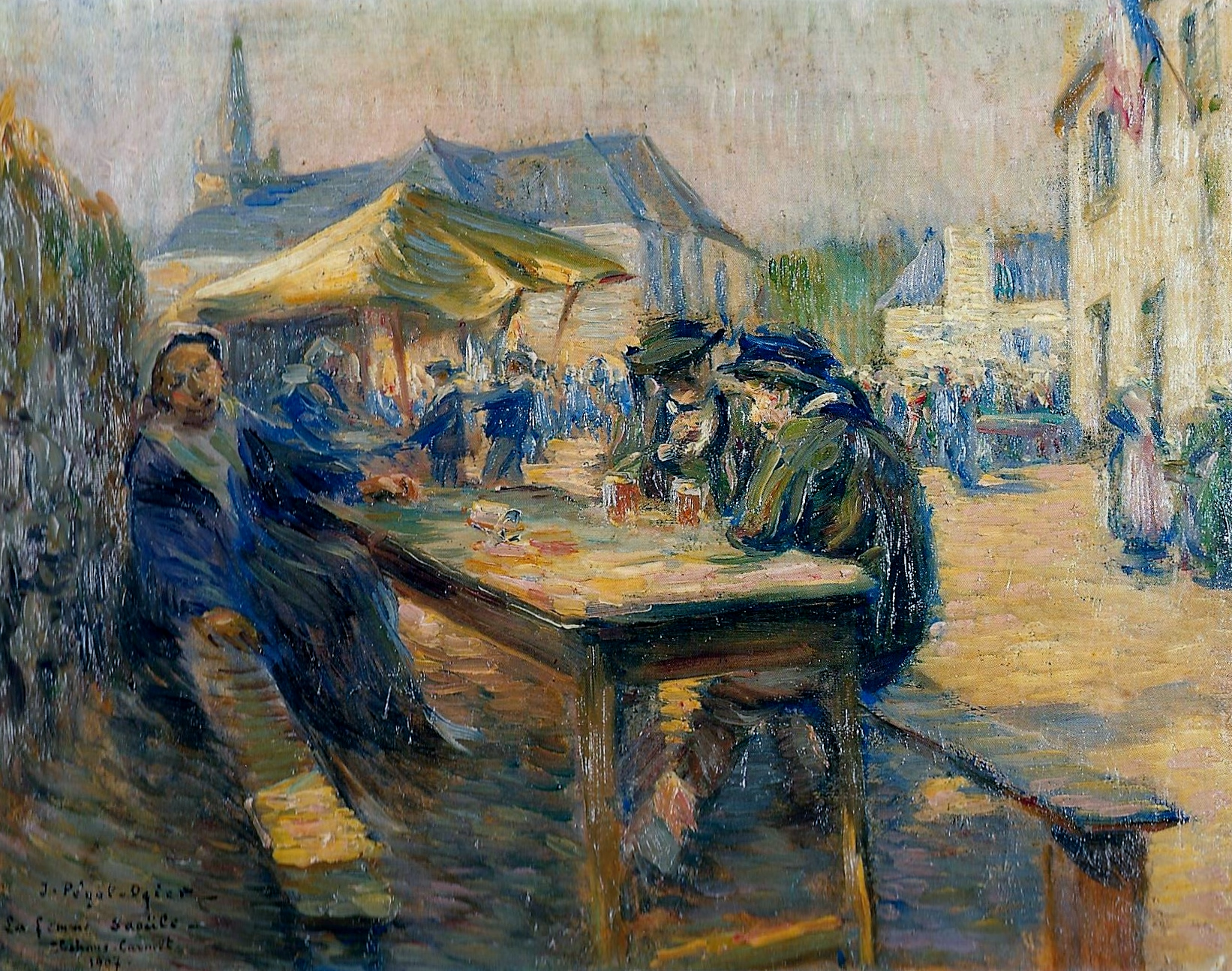
La Femme saoule. Clohars-Carnoët (1907), location unknown.

- Chasse-marée au Pouldu (1898).
- Le Pouldu. Marianne Landeau.
- Rivière bretonne (1897).
- Séchage du linge près de la rivière (1898).
- Paysage (1898).
- Propos de buveurs (1900), exhibited at the Salon des artistes français.
- Éloge du cidre (1900), exhibited at the Salon des artistes français.
- Le Cidre répandu (1901), exhibited at the Salon des artistes français.
- Étude de neige (1904).
- Le Chapelet (1905).
- La Procession (1905), oil on canvas, 46 × 55 cm, sold for €3,600 in Brest on 22 July 2023.
- Nu (1905).
- Deux pivoines (1905).
- Les Grèves des forges en 1906 (1906), Hennebont town hall.
- À Sainte-Anne-d'Auray (1907), exhibited in April in Rennes at the exhibition of the Association artistique et littéraire de Bretagne.
- Matin de mai (1907), exhibited in April in Rennes at the exhibition of the Association artistique et littéraire de Bretagne.
- L'Attente au pied du phare de Doëlan (1907), exhibited in April in Rennes at the exhibition of the Association artistique et littéraire de Bretagne.
- La Vigne vierge (1907), exhibited in April in Rennes at the exhibition of the Association artistique et littéraire de Bretagne.
- Odette au chapeau (1907).
- Étude de femme au bord de la mer (1907), exhibited in October in Paris at the Salon d'automne.
- Un effet de soleil à tout casser sur des laveuses (1908).
- Les Barques au sec (1908), exhibited in March in Paris at the Salon des indépendants.
- Les Laveuses (1908), exhibited in March in Paris at the Salon des indépendants.
- Sainte-Anne-d'Auray (1908), exhibited in March in Paris at the Salon des indépendants.
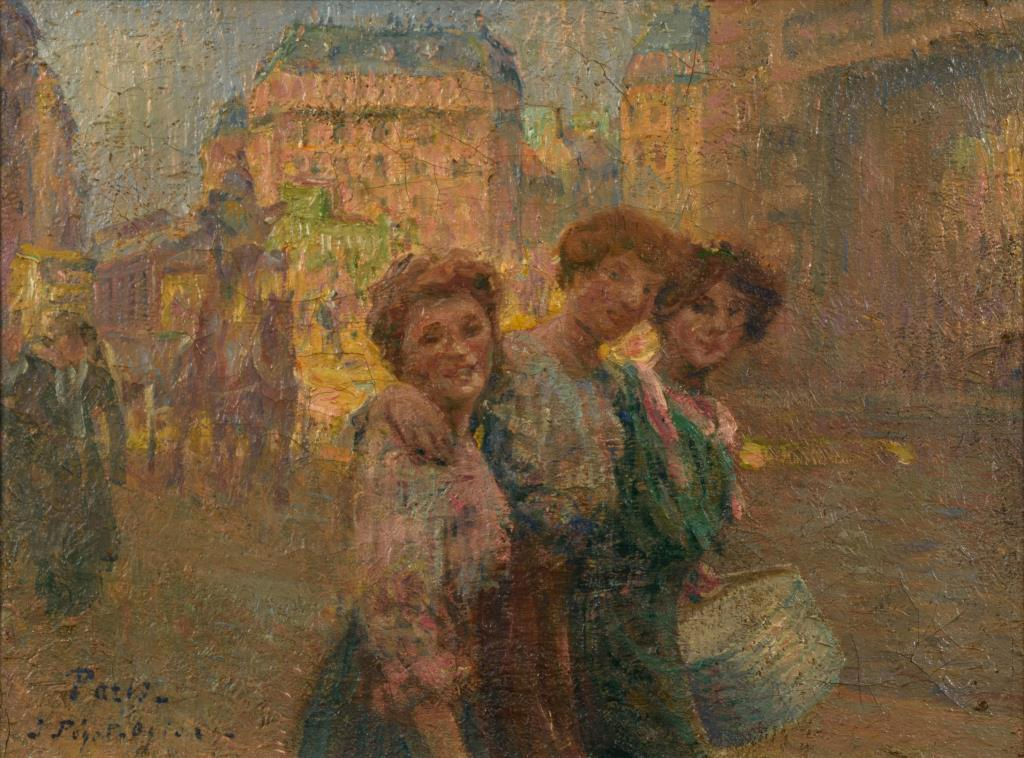
- Jean-Bertrand Pégot-Ogier: Trois femmes à Paris (oil on canvas, before 1915)
  Étude de Bretonnes (1908), exhibited in March in Paris at the Salon des indépendants.
- Sardinières de Doëlan (1908), exhibited in March in Paris at the Salon des indépendants.
- Marché à Hennebont (1908), exhibited in March in Paris at the Salon des indépendants.
- Paysage breton, le Blavet (1908), exhibited in October in Paris at the Salon d'automne, acquired by the Musée de Lorient.
- Les quatre saisons (1908), screen.
- Paysage à vaches (1908).
- Triptyque de fleurs (1908).
- Fleurs sur la terrasse (1909), exhibited in March in Paris at the Salon de la Société nationale des beaux-arts.
- Les Choux (1909), exhibited in March in Paris at the Salon des indépendants.
- Bretonne à la poupée (1909), exhibited in March in Paris at the Salon des indépendants.
- Fleurs sur la terrasse (1909), exhibited in November in Paris at the Salon d'automne.
- Blavet (marée haute) (1909), exhibited in November in Paris at the Salon d'automne.
- Pardon de Saint-Philibert (1909), pastel, exhibited in December in Nantes at the Société des artistes bretons.
- Noël breton (1909).
- Pour les matelots bretons (1910), a lithograph made on the occasion of the 1910 Paris flood and published by Le Breton de Paris.
- Soir en Bretagne, bateaux de pêche (1910), exhibited in February in Nantes at the Amis des Arts.
- La Robe rouge (1910), exhibited in February in Nantes at the Amis des Arts.
- La Moisson (1910), exhibited in March in Paris at the Salon des indépendants.
- La Danse (1910), exhibited in March in Paris at the Salon des indépendants.
- Le Lavoir (1910), exhibited in March in Paris at the Salon des indépendants.
- Le Pardon (1910), exhibited in March in Paris at the Salon des indépendants.
- Le Jardin (1910), exhibited in March in Paris at the Salon des indépendants.
- Matin de mai (1911), exhibited in April in Paris at the Salon des indépendants.
- Procession bretonne (1911), exhibited in April in Paris at the Salon des indépendants.
- Pardon breton (1911), exhibited in April in Paris at the Salon des indépendants.
- Paysage breton (1911), exhibited in April in Paris at the Salon des indépendants.
- Moissonneurs (1911), exhibited in April in Paris at the Salon des indépendants.
- Femmes dans un jardin (1911), exhibited in April in Paris at the Salon des indépendants.
- L'Arrosage du potager (1911), exhibited in October in Paris at the Salon d'automne.
- Paysage au Pouldu, Bretagne (1) (1912), exhibited in April in Paris at the Salon des indépendants.
- Paysage au Pouldu, Bretagne (2) (1912), exhibited in April in Paris at the Salon des indépendants.
- Paysage au Pouldu, Bretagne (3) (1912), exhibited in April in Paris at the Salon des indépendants.
- Moisson en Bretagne or Maison en Bretagne (1911).
- Lavoir de Sherbilling, Pouldu (1911), exhibited in October in Paris at the Salon d'automne.
- La Cale du Pouldu (1911), exhibited in October in Paris at the Salon d'automne.
- Jeune breton au panier. À l'ami Maxence (1911).
- Scène bretonnes (1913), exhibited in April in Paris at the Salon des indépendants.
- Le Pouldu, Finistère (1) (1913), exhibited in April in Paris at the Salon des indépendants.
- Le Pouldu, Finistère (2) (1913), exhibited in April in Paris at the Salon des indépendants.
- Bretagne, triptyque (1913), exhibited in October in Paris at the Salon d'automne.
- Marine au Pouldu (1913), exhibited in October in Paris at the Salon d'automne.
- Paysage au Pouldu (1) (1913), exhibited in October in Paris at the Salon d'automne.
- Paysage au Pouldu (2) (1913), exhibited in October in Paris at the Salon d'automne.
- Pardon de la Pitié, Pouldu (1913).
- Le Pouldu, Marianne Landeau (c. 1913).
- Lecture (1913), drawing, wash and ink, exhibited in October in Paris at the Salon d'automne.
- À Concarneau (1913), pen drawing with highlights, exhibited in October in Paris at the Salon d'automne.
- Procession au Pouldu (1914), exhibited in April in Paris at the Salon des indépendants.
- Jeune bretonne d'Hennebont (1914), exhibited in April in Paris at the Salon des indépendants.
- Pardon en Bretagne (1914), exhibited in April in Paris at the Salon des indépendants.
- Fleurs sur la terrasse (1914), exhibited in April in Paris at the Salon des artistes français.
- Le Pouldu, Finistère (1914), watercolour, exhibited in April in Paris at the Salon des artistes français.
- Le vieux pont, Pont-Scorff (1914).
- La Gavotte, Morbihan (1914).
- Le Scorff à Pont-Scorff (1914), oil on canvas, 46 × 65 cm, private collection.

Undated works

- Bretonnes assises au Lohic, oil on wood. Le Lohic is a district of Port-Louis.
- La Dame au chapeau vert, watercolour, Hennebont town hall.
- Le Grazelou au Pouldu, Lorient, Musée national de la Marine at Port-Louis.
- L'Artiste dans la chapelle, Musée du Faouët.
- Fermes dans un paysage de Bretagne, Musée des Beaux-Arts de Rennes.
- Le Mousse aux deux canots (oil on cardboard, private collection).
- Bretonne assise, Doëlan.
- Jeune bretonne allongée.
- Jeunes filles bretonnes en prière.
- Jeune Bretonne de Pont-Scorff, jour de printemps.
- Bords de l'Aven synthétistes, oil on canvas, 65 × 50 cm, sold for €5,400 in Brest on 22 July 2023.
- Portrait de femme, oil on cardboard, 46 × 36 cm, sold for €1,000 in Brest on 22 July 2023.
- Autoportrait, oil on cardboard, 48 × 58 cm, sold for €1,000 in Brest on 22 July 2023.

=== Drawing and book illustration ===
Undated works

- Hameau inconnu, Hennebont municipal archives.
- Merlevenez, Hennebont municipal archives.
- Élégante au chapeau vert, Hennebont municipal archives.

== Publications ==
- "Nos compatriotes : Paul Sérusier". Le Breton de Paris (in French). February 1909.
- "Nos compatriotes : Ulman". Le Breton de Paris (in French). March 1909.
- "La Bretagne au Salon : Société des artistes français". Le Breton de Paris (in French). May 1909.
- "Exposition des 100 portraits de femmes". Le Breton de Paris (in French). July 1909.
- "Morbihan : exposition à Lorient". Le Breton de Paris (in French). July 1909.
- "La Bretagne au Salon d'automne". Le Breton de Paris (in French). October 1909.
- "M. Guillevic, peintre et sculpteur". Le Breton de Paris (in French). November 1909.
- "15e exposition des Artistes Bretons, Nantes". Le Breton de Paris (in French). December 1909.
- "Exposition Maxime Maufra, chez Durand-Ruel, rue Lafitte". Le Breton de Paris (in French). November 1910.
- "Exposition de peintres bretons : Yann d'Argent, Lucas, Cottet, Simon, d'Estienne, Lemordant". Le Breton de Paris (in French). June 1911.
- "Un artiste breton : Henry Moret". Le Breton de Paris (in French). May 1913.
- "Exposition "Jeune Bretagne"". Le Temps (in French). November 1913.
- Exposition Galerie Artes, 8, rue Tronchet, Paris, from June 1921 to 4 July 1921, L'Art et les Artistes, 18 June 1921, p. 377.
