= Influence of the French Revolution =

Impact of 1789–1799 sociopolitical change

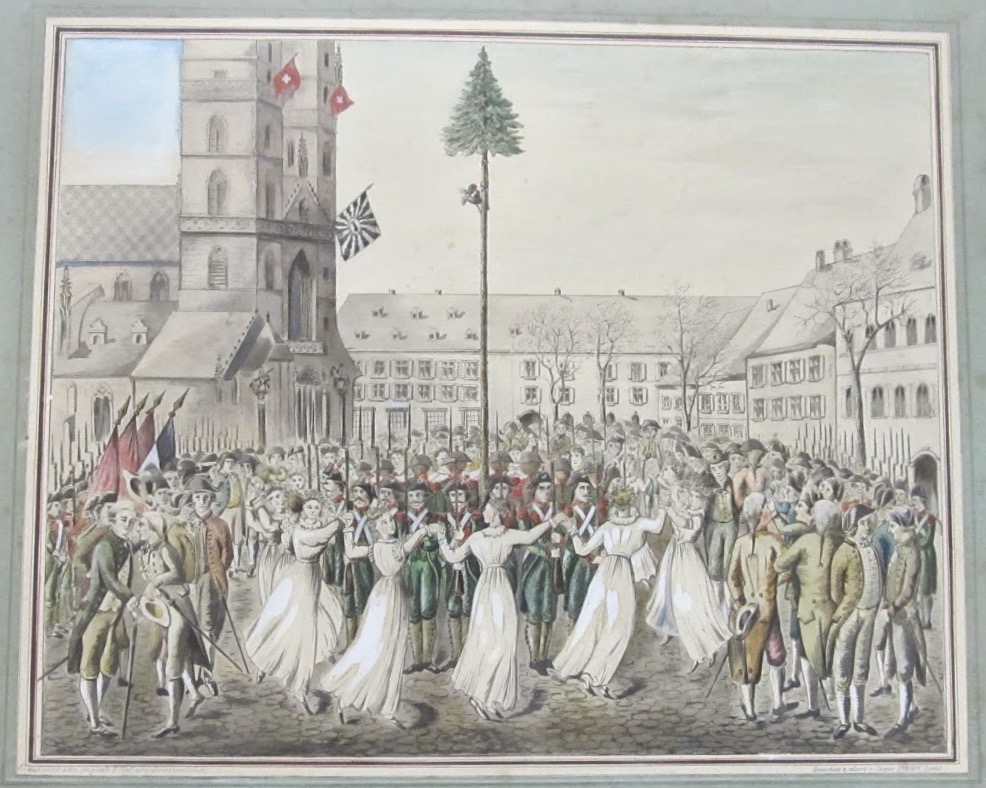
Liberty Tree in Basel, January 1798

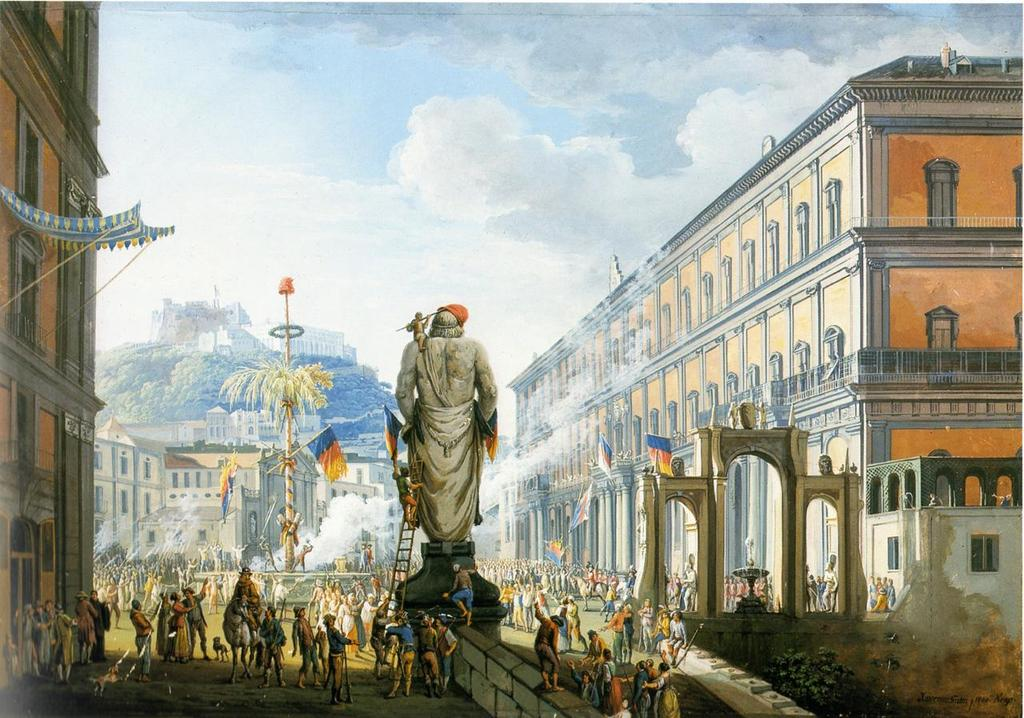
Naples during the Parthenopean Republic, 1799

The French Revolution had a major impact on Europe and the New World. Historians widely regard the Revolution as one of the most important events in European history. In the short-term, France lost thousands of its countrymen in the form of émigrés, or emigrants who wished to escape political tensions and save their lives. A number of individuals settled in the neighboring countries (chiefly Great Britain, Germany and Austria), while some settled in Russia, and many also went to Canada and the United States. The displacement of these Frenchmen led to a spread of French culture, policies regulating immigration, and a safe haven for Royalists and other counterrevolutionaries to outlast the violence of the French Revolution. The long-term impact on France was profound, shaping politics, society, religion and ideas for more than a century. The closer other countries were, the greater and deeper was the French impact, bringing liberalism, but also practices such as direct democracy and revolutionary terror along with the end of many feudal or traditional laws and practices. However, there was also a conservative counter-reaction that defeated Napoleon, reinstalled the Bourbon kings, and in some ways reversed the new reforms.

Most of the new nations created by France were abolished and returned to prewar owners in 1814. However, Frederick Artz overly emphasizes the benefits the Italians gained from the French Revolution:

For nearly two decades the Italians had the excellent codes of law, a fair system of taxation, a better economic situation, and more religious and intellectual toleration than they had known for centuries.... Everywhere old physical, economic, and intellectual barriers had been thrown down and the Italians had begun to be aware of a common nationality.

Likewise in Switzerland the long-term impact of the French Revolution has been assessed by Martin:

It proclaimed the equality of citizens before the law, equality of languages, freedom of thought and faith; it created a Swiss citizenship, basis of our modern nationality, and the separation of powers, of which the old regime had no conception; it suppressed internal tariffs and other economic restraints; it unified weights and measures, reformed civil and penal law, authorized mixed marriages (between Catholics and Protestants), suppressed torture and improved justice; it developed education and public works.

The greatest impact came in France itself. In addition to effects similar to those in Italy and Switzerland, France saw the introduction of the principle of legal equality, and the downgrading of the once powerful and rich Catholic Church to just a bureau controlled by the government, power became centralized in Paris, with its strong bureaucracy and an army supplied by conscripting all young men. French politics were permanently polarized—'left' and 'right' were the new terms for the supporters and opponents of the principles of the Revolution.

== Impact on France ==
The changes in France were enormous; some were widely accepted and others were bitterly contested into the late 20th century. Before the Revolution, the people had little power or voice. The kings had so thoroughly centralized the system that most nobles spent their time at Versailles, and played only a small direct role in their home districts. Thompson says that the kings had: "ruled by virtue of their personal wealth, their patronage of the nobility, their disposal of ecclesiastical offices, their provincial governors (intendants), their control over the judges and magistrates, and their command of the Army."

After the first year of revolution, this power had been stripped away. The king was a figurehead, the nobility had lost all their titles and most of their land, the Church lost its monasteries and farmlands, bishops, judges and magistrates were elected by the people, the army was almost helpless, with military power in the hands of the new revolutionary National Guard. The central elements of 1789 were the slogan "Liberté, égalité, fraternité" and the Declaration of the Rights of Man and of the Citizen, which Lefebvre calls "the incarnation of the Revolution as a whole."

The long-term impact on France was profound, shaping politics, society, religion and ideas, and polarizing politics for more than a century. Historian François Aulard writes:

From the social point of view, the Revolution consisted in the suppression of what was called the feudal system, in the emancipation of the individual, in greater division of landed property, the abolition of the privileges of noble birth, the establishment of equality, the simplification of life.... The French Revolution differed from other revolutions in being not merely national, for it aimed at benefiting all humanity."

== Impact on Europe ==
Europe was wracked by two decades of war revolving around France's efforts to spread its revolutionary ideals, and the opposition of reactionary royalty by the members of the anti-French coalitions. Napoleon was finally defeated and reactionaries took over France. Even so, there were many deep results in terms of political ideas and institutions.

=== French emigration ===
To escape political tensions and save their lives, a number of individuals, mostly men, emigrated from France. Many settled in neighboring countries (chiefly Great Britain, Germany, Austria, and Prussia), and quite a few went to the United States. The presence of these thousands of Frenchmen of varying socioeconomic backgrounds who had just fled a hotbed of revolutionary activity posed a problem for the nations that extended refuge to the migrants. The fear was that they brought with them a plot to disrupt the political order, which did lead to increased regulation and documentation of the influx of immigrants in neighboring countries. Still, most nations such as Britain remained magnanimous and welcomed the French.

=== French conquests ===
In foreign affairs, the French Army at first was quite successful. It conquered the Austrian Netherlands (approximately modern-day Belgium) and turned it into another province of France. It conquered the Dutch Republic (the present Netherlands), and made it a puppet state. It took control of the German areas on the left bank of the Rhine River and set up a puppet regime. It conquered Switzerland and most of Italy, setting up a series of puppet states. The result was glory for France, and an infusion of much needed money from the conquered lands, which also provided direct support to the French Army. However the enemies of France, led by Britain and funded by the British Treasury, formed a Second Coalition in 1799 (with Britain joined by Russia, the Ottoman Empire, and Austria). It scored a series of victories that rolled back French successes, and the French Army became trapped in Egypt. Napoleon himself slipped through the British blockade in October 1799, returning to Paris.

Napoleon conquered most of Italy in the name of the French Revolution in 1797–99. He consolidated old units and split up Austria's holdings. He set up a series of new republics, complete with new codes of law and abolition of old feudal privileges. Napoleon's Cisalpine Republic was centered on Milan. Genoa the city became a republic while its hinterland became the Ligurian Republic. The Roman Republic was formed out of the papal holdings while the pope himself was sent to France. The Neapolitan Republic was formed around Naples, but it lasted only five months before the enemy forces of the Coalition recaptured it.

In 1805 he formed the Kingdom of Italy, with himself as king and his stepson as viceroy. In addition, France turned the Netherlands into the Batavian Republic, and Switzerland into the Helvetic Republic. All these new countries were satellites of France and had to pay large subsidies to Paris, as well as provide military support for Napoleon's wars. Their political and administrative systems were modernized, the metric system introduced, and trade barriers reduced. Jewish ghettos were abolished. Belgium and Piedmont became integral parts of France.
The new nations were abolished and returned to prewar owners in 1814. However, Artz emphasizes the benefits the Italians gained from the French Revolution:

For nearly two decades the Italians had the excellent codes of law, a fair system of taxation, a better economic situation, and more religious and intellectual toleration than they had known for centuries.... Everywhere old physical, economic, and intellectual barriers had been thrown down and the Italians had begun to be aware of a common nationality.

=== Nationalism ===
Otto Dann and John Dinwiddy report, "It has long been almost a truism of European history that the French Revolution gave a great stimulus to the growth of modern nationalism." Nationalism was emphasized by historian Carlton J. H. Hayes as a major result of the French Revolution across Europe. The impact on French nationalism was profound. Napoleon became such a heroic symbol of the nation that the glory was easily picked up by his nephew, who was overwhelmingly elected president (and later became Emperor Napoleon III). The influence was great in the hundreds of small German states and elsewhere, where it was either inspired by the French example or in reaction against it.

=== Britain ===
At the beginning of the Revolution, Britain supported the new constitutional monarchy in France, up until the regicide of Louis XVI. The majority of the British establishment was vehemently opposed to the revolution. Britain, guided by Pitt the Younger, led and funded the series of coalitions that fought France from 1793 to 1815, and the removal of Napoleon Bonaparte culminated with the (temporary) restoration of the Bourbons. Edmund Burke wrote Reflections on the Revolution in France, a pamphlet notable for its defense of the principle of constitutional monarchy; the events surrounding the London Corresponding Society were an example of the fevered times.

=== Ireland ===
In Ireland, the effect was to transform what had been an attempt by the Protestant Ascendancy to gain some autonomy into a mass movement led by the Society of United Irishmen consisting of both Catholics and Protestants. It stimulated the demand for further reform throughout Ireland, especially in Ulster. These efforts culminated in the Irish Rebellion of 1798, which was quickly suppressed. This revolt is seen as the foundation for Irish republicanism, which eventually led to the independence and partition of Ireland and the establishment of an Irish republic.

=== Germany ===
German reaction to the Revolution swung from favorable at first to antagonistic. At first it brought liberal and democratic ideas, the end of guilds, of serfdom and of the Jewish ghetto. It brought economic freedoms and agrarian and legal reform. German intellectuals celebrated the outbreak, hoping to see the triumph of Reason and The Enlightenment. There were enemies as well, as the royal courts in Vienna and Berlin denounced the overthrow of the king and the threatened spread of notions of liberty, equality, and fraternity.

By 1793, the execution of the French king and the onset of the Terror disillusioned the "Bildungsbürgertum" (educated middle classes). Reformers said the solution was to have faith in the ability of Germans to reform their laws and institutions in peaceful fashion.

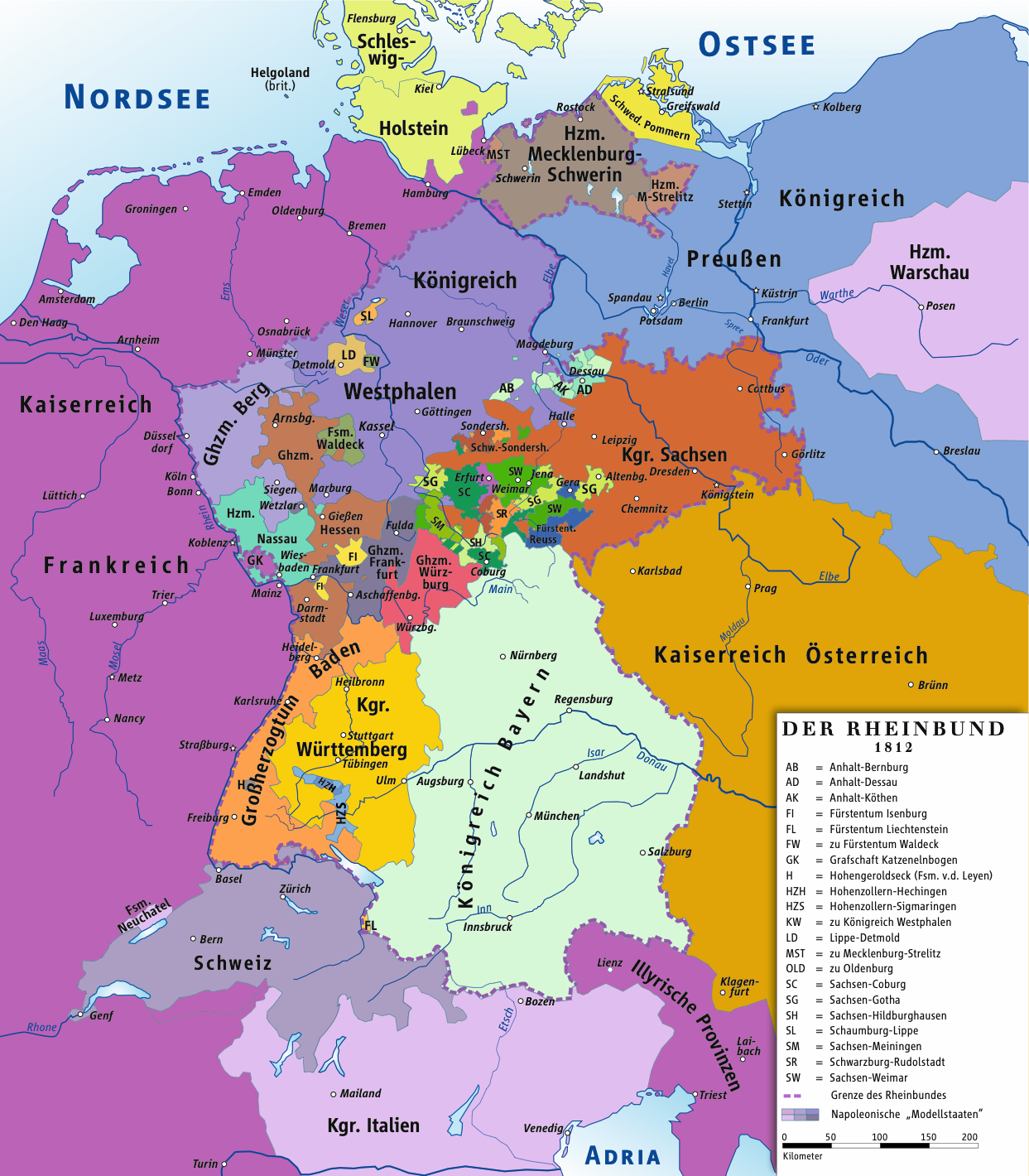
The Confederation of the Rhine, composed of client states under Napoleon's control, 1806 to 1813; most German states belonged except Prussia (in the northeast) and Austria (in the southeast). The map text is in German.

After Russia was humiliated by Napoleon opinion swung against France and stimulated and shaped German nationalism.

France took direct control of the Rhineland 1794–1814 and radically and permanently liberalized the government, society and economy.

The French swept away centuries' worth of restrictions and introduced unprecedented levels of efficiency. The chaos and barriers in a land divided and subdivided among many different petty principalities gave way to a simplified, centralized system controlled by Paris and run by Napoleon's relatives. The most important impact came from the abolition of all feudal privileges and historic taxes, the introduction of legal reforms of the Napoleonic Code, and the reorganization of the judicial and local administrative systems. The economic integration of the Rhineland with France increased prosperity, especially in industrial production, while business accelerated with the new efficiency and lowered trade barriers. The Jews were liberated from the ghetto. One sour point was the hostility of the French officials toward the Roman Catholic Church, the choice of most of the residents. Much of South Germany felt a similar but more muted influence of the French Revolution, while in Prussia and areas to the east there was far less impact. The reforms were permanent. Decades later workers and peasants in the Rhineland often appealed to Jacobinism to oppose unpopular government programs, while the intelligentsia demanded the maintenance of the Napoleonic Code (which was stayed in effect for a century).

=== Poland ===
When the French invaded Russia, Prussia and Austria, Napoleon carved out a Polish state allied to the French known as The Duchy of Warsaw, the Polish had had their first glimpse of independence for 200 years since the partitions of Poland by Russia Austria and Prussia. This also led to an increase in Polish nationalism that would persist throughout the 19th and 20th century.

=== Switzerland ===
The French invaded Switzerland and turned it into an ally known as the "Helvetic Republic" (1798–1803). The interference with localism and traditional liberties was deeply resented, although some modernizing reforms took place. Resistance was strongest in the more traditional Catholic bastions, with armed uprisings breaking out in spring 1798 in the central part of Switzerland. Alois Von Reding, a powerful Swiss general, led an army of 10,000 men from the Cantons of Uri, Schwyz and Nidwalden against the French. This resulted in the Swiss regaining control of Lucerne, however due to the sheer greatness in size of the French army, Von Reding's movement was eventually suppressed. The French Army suppressed the uprisings but support for revolutionary ideals steadily declined, as the Swiss resented their loss of local democracy, the new taxes, the centralization, and the hostility to religion.

The instability of France resulted in the creation of two different revolutionary groups with different ideologies of revolt: The aristocrats, seeking the restoration of the Old Swiss Confederacy and a section of the population wanting a coup. Furthermore, Switzerland became a battleground between the armies of France, Austria and Russia. Ultimately, this instability, frequent coups within the government and the eventual Bourla-papey forced Napoleon to sign the Act of Medallion which led to the fall of the Helvetic Republic and the restoration of the Confederacy.

The long-term impact of the French Revolution has been assessed by Martin:

It proclaimed the equality of citizens before the law, equality of languages, freedom of thought and faith; it created a Swiss citizenship, basis of our modern nationality, and the separation of powers, of which the old regime had no conception; it suppressed internal tariffs and other economic restraints; it unified weights and measures, reformed civil and penal law, authorized mixed marriages (between Catholics and Protestants), suppressed torture and improved justice; it developed education and public works.

=== Belgium ===
French invaded the territory of modern-day Belgium and controlled it between 1794 and 1814. The French imposed reforms and incorporated the territory into France. New rulers were sent in by Paris. Belgian men were drafted into the French wars and heavily taxed. Nearly everyone was Catholic, but the Church was repressed. Resistance was strong in every sector, as Belgian nationalism emerged to oppose French rule. The French legal system, however, was adopted, with its equal legal rights, and abolition of class distinctions. Belgium now had a government bureaucracy selected by merit.

Antwerp regained access to the sea and grew quickly as a major port and business center. France promoted commerce and capitalism, paving the way for the ascent of the bourgeoisie and the rapid growth of manufacturing and mining. In economics, therefore, the nobility declined while the middle class Belgian entrepreneurs flourished because of their inclusion in a large market, paving the way for Belgium's leadership role after 1815 in the Industrial Revolution on the Continent.

=== Netherlands ===
France turned the Netherlands into a puppet state that had to pay large indemnities.

=== Denmark, Norway and Sweden ===
The Kingdom of Denmark (which included Norway) adopted liberalizing reforms in line with those of the French Revolution, with no direct contact. Danes were aware of French ideas and agreed with them, as it moved from Danish absolutism to a liberal constitutional system between 1750 and 1850. The change of government in 1784 was caused by a power vacuum created when King Christian VII took ill, and power shifted to the crown prince (who later became King Frederik VI) and reform-oriented landowners. In contrast to Old Regime France, agricultural reform was intensified in Denmark, serfdom was abolished and civil rights were extended to the peasants, the finances of the Danish state were healthy, and there were no external or internal crises. That is, reform was gradual and the regime itself carried out agrarian reforms that had the effect of weakening absolutism by creating a class of independent peasant freeholders. Much of the initiative came from well-organized liberals who directed political change in the first half of the 19th century.

In Sweden, King Gustav III (reigned 1771–92) was an enlightened despot, who weakened the nobility and promoted numerous major social reforms. He felt the Swedish monarchy could survive and flourish by achieving a coalition with the newly emerged middle classes against the nobility. He was close to King Louis XVI so he was disgusted with French radicalism. Nevertheless, he decided to promote additional antifeudal reforms to strengthen his hand among the middle classes. When the king was assassinated in 1792 his brother Charles became regent, but real power was with Gustaf Adolf Reuterholm, who bitterly opposed the French Revolution and all its supporters. Under King Gustav IV Adolf, Sweden joined various coalitions against Napoleon, but was badly defeated and lost much of its territory, especially Finland and Pomerania. The king was overthrown by the army, which in 1810 decided to bring in one of Napoleon's marshals, Bernadotte, as the heir apparent and army commander. He had a Jacobin background and was well-grounded in revolutionary principles, but put Sweden in the coalition that opposed Napoleon. Bernadotte served as a quite conservative king Charles XIV John of Sweden (1818–44), and his realm included Norway, taken from Denmark in 1814.

=== Russia ===
The Russian public were interested in the French Revolution from its very beginning in 1789. However, strict censorship, absence of political activity in Russia at the time, and the overall low education of the general populace diminished the effects of the revolution regarding cultural and political life, in contrast to other countries. It was not until the late 19th century where the French Revolution became a major discussion topic in Russian politics, with all political groups sharing interest and attention to it.

Early reactions to the French Revolution were generally hostile. Catherine the Great, who reigned at the time, reacted with horror at the French Revolution. This was notable given that she had held quite liberal views for a Russian monarch and had correspondence with leading French intellectuals such as Voltaire. She ended up abandoning her liberal standing and both disdained and feared the Revolution. She had the novel Journey from St. Petersburg to Moscow written by Alexander Radishchev burned as she believed it dangerously promoted the French Revolution and even sent Radischev to exile in Siberia. Radischev had also previously rejected serfdom and was a known social critic, which contributed to Catherine and the court's suspicion of his character and eventual exile.

Many Russian intellectuals held different views on why the French Revolution began. Nikolai Fyodorov saw sexuality as a key factor behind the French Revolution; in his book, The Philosophy of the Common Task, he viewed sexuality as a "demonic" force driving humanity to revolution and war, listing the French Revolution as an example. Leading editor and art critic of Novoye Vremya, Fedor Bulgakov, approached the French Revolution in a similar context, but he also saw faulty advice and bad luck as other partial reasons for the downfall of the French monarchy. Other Novoye Vremya contributors described the sexuality mentioned by Fyodrov and Bulgakov as a destructive phenomenon that plagued the French gentry with absolute cynicism, causing the monarchs to become effeminate and helping in their downfall in the revolution. According to these contributors, the entire 18th century was marked by "insane profligacy". The Reign of Terror was also partially explained by French sexuality, with desires to be successful lovers driving the revolutionaries to gain power.

On the other hand, intellectuals like Nikolay Danilevsky and Leo Tolstoy believed that violence was the main cause of the French Revolution, related to their beliefs about Western violence. Danilevsky, using notable scientific racism in his works, incorporated the French Revolution heavily. In his work, Russia and Europe: A Look at the Cultural and Political Relations of the Slavic World to the Romano-German World, he viewed Russians and Europeans as two separate species, with Europeans being a naturally violent species. According to Danilevsky, this is why the European French had started the revolution. Danilevsky also believed this explained their "inherent cruelty" during the Napoleonic Wars. In Tolstoy's case, he had witnessed a guillotine execution in Paris, which is thought to have led to him reading Joseph de Maistre, interpreting his works in a way that made it seem like only the west (including France) was "cruel" and "bellicose". This explains why in War and Peace, Napoleon and his officers are portrayed as being entirely indifferent to the suffering of civilians and soldiers, even of their own.

== Impact outside Europe ==
=== West Asia and North Africa ===
==== Ottoman Empire ====
The impact of the French Revolution on the Middle East came in terms of the political and military impact of Napoleon's invasions of Egypt and Syria; and in the eventual influence of revolutionary and liberal ideas and revolutionary movements or rebellions. In terms of Napoleon's invasion in 1798, the response by Ottoman officials was highly negative. They warned that traditional religion would be overthrown. Long-standing Ottoman friendship with France ended. Ottoman elites were heavily antithetical to the values of French Revolution and regarded it as a materialist movement hostile to all religions and promoting atheism. Sultan Selim III immediately realized how far behind his empire was, and started to modernize both his army and his governmental system. In Egypt itself, the ruling elite of Mamluks was permanently displaced, speeding the reforms. In intellectual terms, the immediate impact of the French Revolutionary ideas was nearly invisible, but there was a long-range influence on liberal ideas and the ideal of legal equality, as well as the notion of opposition to a tyrannical government. In this regard, the French Revolution brought such influential themes as constitutionalism, parliamentarianism, individual liberty, legal equality, and the sense of ethnic nationalism. These came to fruition about 1876.

Portraying the revolution as "a nasty case of syphilis", an official 1798 report by the Ottoman Reis ül-Küttab states:

"the conflagration of sedition and wickedness that broke out a few years ago in France, scattering sparks and shooting flames of mischief and tumult in all directions, had been conceived many years previously in the minds of certain accursed heretics.. In this way: the known and famous atheists Voltaire and Rousseau, and other materialists like them, had printed and published various works.. of insults and vilification against the pure prophets and great kings, of the removal and abolition of all religion, and of allusions to the sweetness of equality and republicanism, all expressed in easily intelligible words and phrases, in the form of mockery, in the language of the common people. Finding the pleasure of novelty in these writings, most of the people, even youths and women, inclined towards them and paid close attention to them, so that heresy and wickedness spread like syphilis to the arteries of their brains and corrupted their beliefs. When the revolution became more intense, none took offence at the closing of churches, the killing and expulsion of monks, and the abolition of religion and doctrine: they set their hearts on equality and freedom.. the ultimate basis of the order and cohesion of every state is a firm grasp of the roots and branches of holy law, religion, and doctrine; that the tranquillity of the land and the control of the subjects cannot be encompassed by political means alone; that the necessity for the fear of God and the regard for retribution in the hearts of God's slaves is one of the unshakeably established divine decrees.. the leaders of the sedition and evil appearing in France, in a manner without precedent.. have removed the fear of God and the regard for retribution from the common people, made lawful all kinds of abominable deeds, utterly obliterated all shame and-decency, and thus prepared the way for the reduction of the people of France to the state of cattle... Nor were they satisfied with this alone, .. they had their rebellious declaration which they call 'The Rights of Man' translated into all languages and published in all parts, and strove to incite the common people of the nations and religions to rebel against the kings to whom they were subject"

==== Egypt ====
Egyptian Islamic scholar and historian 'Abd al-Rahman al-Jabarti (1753–1825 C.E) maintained a strict, puritanical tone in reactions to his witnessing of the advanced military technology, material sciences and cultural values of the French occupiers. As a top-ranking intellectual of Egypt, Al-Jabarti's views on revolution were also unprecedented; and is reflected in his stance on two major revolutions of his lifetime: French Revolution of 1789 and Wahhabi Revolution of 1798 in the Arabian Peninsula. Al-Jabarti was deeply influenced by the reformist ideals of the Arabian Muwahhidun movement and their calls for pan-Islamic fraternity, revival of past Islamic glory by direct engagement with the Scriptures, advocacy of Ijtihad, opposition to folkish superstitions, etc. He gave a supportive account of the movement in his seminal Egyptian history work "Aja'ib al-athar fi al-tarajim wal-akhbar" (The Marvelous Compositions of Biographies and Events) and lamented the fall of Emirate of Dirʿiyya during the Wahhabi Wars. Meanwhile, Jabarti abhorred the Republican ideas of the French revolution such as egalitarianism, liberty and equality; insisting on the supremacy of Wahy (Islamic Revelation) over European rationalism. Although he had acknowledged the advances made by Europeans in certain fields, Jabarti firmly believed in the eventual triumph of Islam over the West and advocated the restoration of Islamic prowess through his works.

In Jabarti's view, only God is the Legislator and French Revolution violated Sharia (Islamic law) by granting this right to the common masses. In his "Tarikh muddat al-faransis bi-misr" (The History of the Period of the French Occupation in Egypt) that chronicled the events of Egypt during June–December 1798, Al-Jabarti gives the following account on the slogans and socio-political values of the French Revolution:

"the French agree with the three religions, but at the same time they do not agree with them, nor with any religion... their statement 'On behalf of the French Republic, etc.', that is, this proclamation is sent from their Republic, that means their body politic, because they have no chief or sultan with whom they all agree, like others, whose function is to speak on their behalf. For when they rebelled against their sultan six years ago and killed him, the people agreed unanimously that there was not to be a single ruler but that their state, territories, laws, and administration of their affairs, should be in the hands of the intelligent and wise men among them. They appointed persons chosen by them and made them heads of the army, and below them generals and commanders of thousands, two hundreds, and tens, administrators and advisers, on condition that they were all to be equal and none superior to any other in view of the equality of creation and nature. They made this the foundation and basis of their system. This is the meaning of their statement 'based upon the foundation of liberty and equality'. Their term 'liberty' means that they are not slaves like the Mamluks; 'equality' has the aforesaid meaning... They follow this rule: great and small, high and low, male and female are all equal. Sometimes they break this rule according to their whims and inclinations or reasoning. Their women do not veil themselves and have no modesty; they do not care whether they uncover their private parts... As for the name 'Bonaparte' this is the title of their general, it is not a name."

=== Northern America ===
==== British North America ====
The press in the colony of Quebec initially viewed the events of the Revolution positively. Press coverage in Quebec on the Revolution was reliant, and reflective of public opinion in London, with the colony's press reliant on newspapers and reprints from journals from the British Isles. The early positive reception of the French Revolution had made it politically difficult to justify withholding electoral institutions from the colony to both the British and Quebec public; with the British Home Secretary William Grenville remarking how it was hardly "possible to 'maintain with success' the denial 'to so large a body of British Subjects, the benefits of the British Constitution'. Governmental reforms introduced in the Constitutional Act 1791 split Quebec into two separate colonies, Lower Canada, and Upper Canada; and introduced electoral institutions to the two colonies.

Opposition to the French Revolution in Quebec first emerged from its clergy, after the French government confiscated the Séminaire de Québec's properties in France. However, most of the clergy in Quebec did not voice their opposition to the Revolution in its initial years, aware of the prevailing opinion of the colony at that time. Public opinion in Quebec began to shift against the Revolution after the Flight to Varennes, and as popular accounts of disturbances in France in 1791 made its way to the colony. After the September Massacres, and the subsequent execution of Louis XVI in January 1793, members of the Canadian clergy, and seigneurs began to openly voice opposition against the Revolution. A shift in public opinion was also apparent in the first session of the Legislative Assembly of Lower Canada, with the legislature voting against several bills inspired by the French Revolution. By 1793, nearly all of the legislative assembly's members refused to be identified as "democrats," a term that was used by supporters of the Revolution. By the end of 1793, the clergy, seigneurs, and the bourgeoisie of the Canadas were openly opposed to the Revolution. Similar sentiments were also found with the "second class of Canadians," who lauded "the French revolution for its principles but detests the crimes it has spawned".

French migration to the Canadas was decelerated significantly during, and after the French Revolution; with only a small number of artisans, professionals, and religious emigres from France permitted to settle in the Canadas during that period. Most of these migrants moved to Montreal or Quebec City, although French nobleman Joseph-Geneviève de Puisaye also led a small group of French royalists to settle lands north of York (present day Toronto). The influx of religious migrants from France reinvigorated the Roman Catholic Church in the Canadas, with the refectory priests who moved to the colonies being responsible for the establishment of a number of parishes throughout the Canadas.

==== United States ====
The French Revolution found widespread American support in its early phase, but when the king was executed it polarized American opinion and played a major role in shaping American politics. President George Washington declared neutrality in the European wars, but the polarization shaped the First Party System. In 1793, the first "Democratic Societies" were formed. They supported the French Revolution in the wake of the execution of the king. The word "democrat" was proposed by French Ambassador Citizen Genet for the societies, which he was secretly subsidizing. The emerging Federalist Party, led by Alexander Hamilton, began to ridicule the supporters of Thomas Jefferson as "democrats". Genet now began mobilizing American voters using French money, for which he was expelled by President Washington.

After President Washington denounced the societies as unrepublican, they faded away. In 1793, as war broke out in Europe, the Jeffersonian Republican Party favored France and pointed to the 1778 treaty that was still in effect. Washington and his unanimous cabinet (including Jefferson) decided the treaty did not bind the U.S. to enter the war, since they stopped being in favor of the Revolution after they executed the King; instead Washington proclaimed neutrality. Under President Adams, a Federalist, an undeclared naval war took place with France in 1798–99, called the "Quasi War". Jefferson became president in 1801, but was hostile to Napoleon as a dictator and emperor. Nevertheless, he did seize the opportunity to purchase Louisiana in 1803.

The broad similarities but different experiences between the French and American revolutions lead to a certain kinship between France and the United States, with both countries seeing themselves as pioneers of liberty and promoting republican ideals. This bond manifested itself in such exchanges as the gift of the Statue of Liberty by France.

=== Haiti and Mexico ===
The call for modification of society was influenced by the revolution in France, and once the hope for change found a place in the hearts of the Haitian people, there was no stopping the radical reformation that was occurring. The Enlightenment ideals and the initiation of the French Revolution were enough to inspire the Haitian Revolution, which evolved into the most successful and comprehensive slave rebellion. Just as the French were successful in transforming their society, so were the Haitians. On April 4, 1792, The French National Assembly granted freedom to slaves in Haiti but denied them their independence from France leading to the continuation of the Haitian revolution and the revolution culminated in 1804; Haiti was an independent nation solely of freed peoples. The activities of the revolutions sparked change across the world. France's transformation was most influential in Europe, and Haiti's influence spanned across every location that continued to practice slavery. John E. Baur honors Haiti as home of the most influential Revolution in history.

As early as 1810, the term "liberal" was coined in Spanish politics to indicate supporters of the French Revolution. This usage passed to Latin America and animated the independence movement against Spain. In the nineteenth century "Liberalism" was the dominant element in Latin American political thought. French liberal ideas were especially influential in Mexico, particularly as seen through the writings of Alexis de Tocqueville, Benjamin Constant and Édouard René de Laboulaye. The Latin American political culture oscillated between two opposite poles: the traditional, as based on highly specific personal and family ties to kin groups, communities, and religious identity; and the modern, based on impersonal ideals of individualism, equality, legal rights, and secularism or anti-clericalism. The French Revolutionary model was the basis for the modern viewpoint, as explicated in Mexico in the writings of José María Luis Mora (1794–1850).

In Mexico, modern liberalism was best expressed in the Liberal Party, the Constitution of 1857, the policies of Benito Juárez, and finally by Francisco I. Madero's democratic movement leading to the Revolution of 1911.

== See also ==
- Edmund Burke#French Revolution: 1688 versus 1789
- French Revolution and the English Gothic Novel
- Liberalism § French revolution
- Romanticism and the French Revolution
- Papal States § Napoleonic era
