= Armand Dayot =

French art critic, art historian and leftist politician

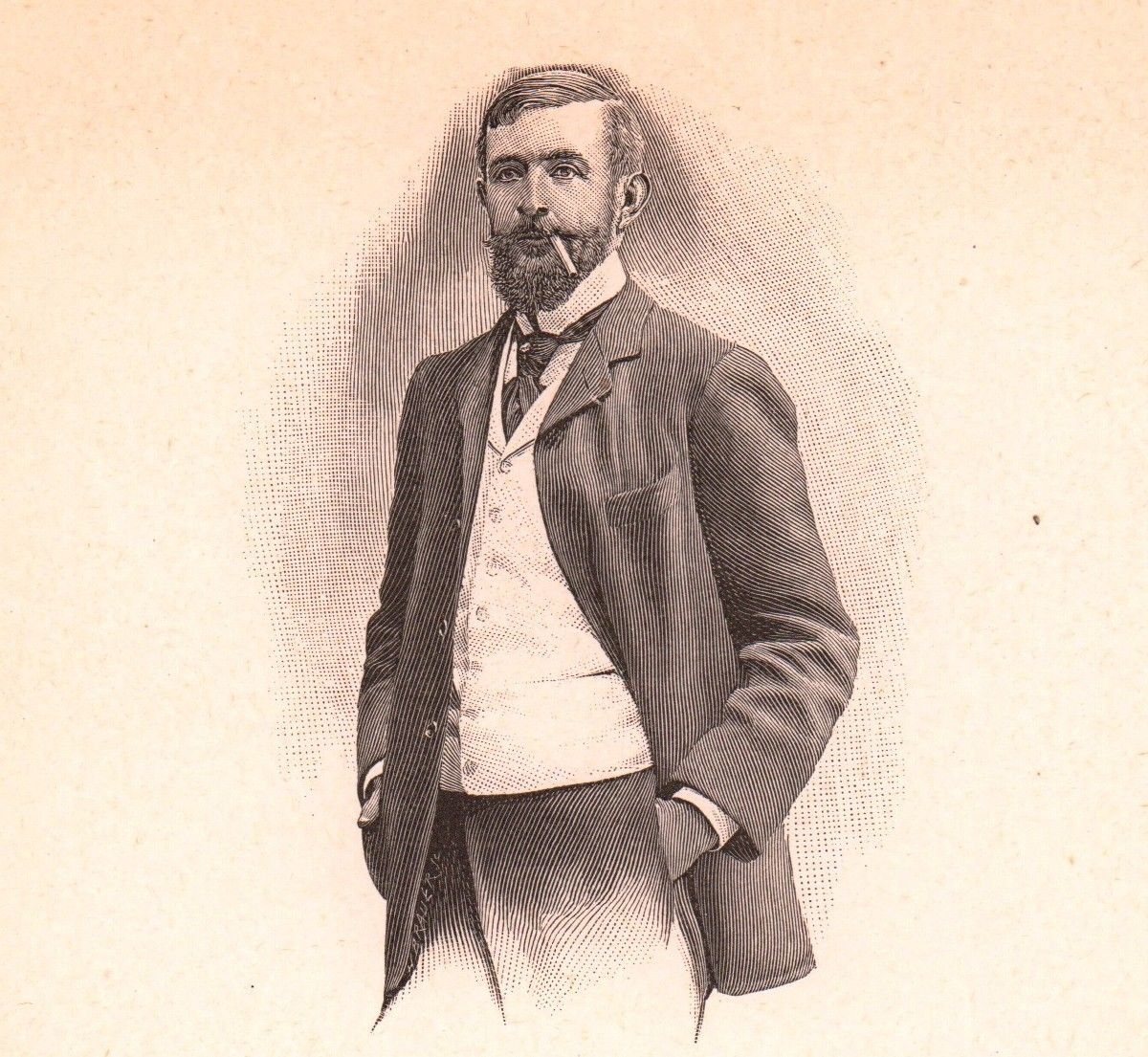
Armand Dayot, from the Album Mariani (c.1906)

Armand Dayot (French: [aʁmɑ̃ dajo]; 19 October 1851 – 2 October 1934) was a French art critic, art historian and leftist politician. He was born in Paimpol, Côtes-d'Armor, Brittany. He founded the journal L'Art et les artistes and the Breton liberal organisation les Bleus de Bretagne.

He became successively the head of the prefecture of Oran, head of the Ministry of Arts in the cabinet of Léon Gambetta, and inspector general of the Ministry of Fine Arts.

In Brittany he was the principal force behind the Bleus de Bretagne, which promoted modern pro-liberal thought in the province. Dayot's principal contribution was to organise the creation of statues to revolutionaries and freethinkers.

Dayot's thinking on the relationship between the arts and politics was deeply influenced by the work of John Ruskin and William Morris.

== Works ==
- Salon de 1884. Cent planches en photogravures, par Goupil et Cie (1884)
- Croquis de voyage, Italie, Espagne, Portugal (1887)
- Les Maîtres de la caricature française au XIXe siècle (1888)
- L'Aventure de Briscart (1888)
- Un siècle d'art, notes sur la peinture française à l'Exposition centennale des beaux-arts, suivies du catalogue complet des œuvres exposées (1890)
- Le Salon de 1890. Cent planches en photogravure et à l'eau-forte, par Goupil et Cie (1890)
- Salon illustré. Société des artistes français et Société nationale des beaux-arts (1891-1892)
- Raffet et son œuvre, 100 compositions lithographiques, peintures à l'huile, aquarelles, sépias et dessins inédits (1892)
- Charlet et son œuvre, par Armand Dayot, 118 compositions lithographiques, peintures à l'huile, aquarelles, sépias et dessins inédits (1893)
- Napoléon raconté par l'image, d'après les sculpteurs, les graveurs et les peintres (1895)
- La Révolution française : Constituante, Législative, Convention, Directoire, d'après des peintures, sculptures, gravures, médailles, objets du temps (1896-1897)
- Journées révolutionnaires, 1830-1848, d'après des peintures, sculptures, dessins, lithographies, médailles, autographes, objets du temps (1897)
- Le Long des routes, récits et impressions (1897) Online text
- Les Vernet : Joseph, Carle, Horace (1898)
- L'Image de la femme depuis l'antiquité jusqu'à nos jours (1899)
- Le Second Empire, 2 décembre 1851-4 septembre 1870, d'après des peintures, gravures, photographies, sculptures, dessins, médailles autographes, objets du temps (1900)
- Histoire contemporaine par l'image, d'après les documents du temps, 1789-1872 (1905)
- Le Vertige de la beauté. 72 compositions de Charles Jouas, gravées sur bois par Eugène Dété (1906)
- La Peinture anglaise, de ses origines à nos jours (1908)
- Napoléon. Illustrations d'après des peintures, sculptures, gravures, objets du temps (1908)
- Louis XIV. Illustrations d'après des peintures, sculptures, gravures, objets du temps (1909)
- Grands et petits maîtres hollandais (1912)
- Histoire générale de la peinture (2 volumes, 1917)
- Carle Vernet, étude sur l'artiste, suivie d'un catalogue de l'œuvre gravé et lithographié et du catalogue de l'exposition rétrospective de 1925 (1925)
- Josuah Reynolds, peintre et esthéticien (1930)
- L'Heureuse Traversée (1933)
- L'Invasion, Le siège, la Commune. 1870-1871. D'après des peintures, gravures, photographies, sculptures, médailles autographes, objets du temps (s. d.) Réédition : Tristan Mage, 2003
- La Folie du Comte Lucius (s. d.)
- La Restauration (Louis XVIII-Charles X) d'après l'image du temps (s. d.)
- Le Moyen Âge. La Gaule Romaine. Les Invasions. La France féodale. La Royauté (s. d.)
- De la Régence à la Révolution, la vie française au XVIIIe siècle (s. d.)
- J.-B. Siméon Chardin. Avec un catalogue complet de l'œuvre du maître, par Jean Guiffrey (s. d.)
