= Romanticism and the French Revolution =

Romanticism originated in the second half of the 18th century at the same time as the French Revolution. Romanticism continued to grow in reaction to the effects of the social transformation caused by the Revolution. There are many signs of these effects of the French Revolution in various pieces of Romantic literature. By examining the influence of the French Revolution, one can determine that Romanticism arose as a reaction to the French Revolution. Instead of searching for rules governing nature and human beings, the romantics searched for a direct communication with nature and treated humans as unique individuals not subject to scientific rules.

== The influence of the French Revolution ==
The French Revolution played a huge role in influencing Romantic writers. As the Revolution began to play out, the absolute monarchy that had ruled France for centuries collapsed in only three years. This resulted in a complete transformation of society. A majority of the population was greatly in favor of this as the working class had been suffering oppression for many years. According to Albert Hancock, in his book The French Revolution and the English Poets: a study in historical criticism, "The French Revolution came, bringing with it the promise of a brighter day, the promise of regenerated man and regenerated earth. It was hailed with joy and acclamation by the oppressed, by the ardent lovers of humanity, by the poets, whose task it is to voice the human spirit."

A common theme among some of the most widely known romantic poets is their acceptance and approval of the French Revolution. William Wordsworth, Samuel Taylor Coleridge, Lord Byron, and Percy Shelley all shared the same view of the French Revolution as it being the beginning of a change in the current ways of society and helping to improve the lives of the oppressed. As the French Revolution changed the lives of virtually everyone in the nation and even continent because of its drastic and immediate shift in social reformation, it greatly influenced many writers at the time. Hancock writes, "There is no need to recount here in detail how the French Revolution, at the close of the last century, was the great stimulus to the intellectual and emotional life of the civilized world, how it began by inspiring all liberty-loving men with hope and joy."

Literature began to take a new turn when the spirit of the revolution caught the entire nation and turned things in a whole new direction. The newly acquired freedom of the common people did not only bring about just laws and living but ordinary people also had the freedom to think for themselves, and in turn the freedom to express themselves. Triggered by the revolutionary spirit, the writers of the time were full of creative ideas and were waiting for a chance to unleash them. Under the new laws writers and artists were given a considerable amount of freedom to express themselves which did well to pave the way to set a high standard for literature.

Prior to the French Revolution, poems and literature were typically written about and to aristocrats and clergy, and rarely for or about the working man. However, when the roles of society began to shift resulting from the French Revolution, and with the emergence of Romantic writers, this changed. Romantic poets such as Wordsworth, Coleridge, Byron, and Shelley started to write works for and about the working man; pieces that the common man could relate to. According to Christensen, "To get the real animating principle of the Romantic Movement, one must not study it inductively or abstractly; one must look at it historically. It must be put beside the literary standards of the eighteenth century. These standards impose limits upon the Elysian fields of poetry; poetry must be confined to the common experience of average men… The Romantic Movement then means the revolt of a group of contemporary poets who wrote, not according to common and doctrinaire standards, but as they individually pleased… there are no principles comprehensive and common to all except those of individualism and revolt."

== A closer look at the influence of the French Revolution on selected Romantic poets ==
Although the poets mentioned earlier (Wordsworth, Coleridge, Byron, and Shelley) all share the common theme of approving the French Revolution, they each have their own unique ideas regarding the Revolution itself that have greatly shaped their work. This can be seen by analyzing some of each of their works.

=== Shelley ===
Ever since he was young, Percy Shelley was very nontraditional. He was born a freethinker and "in spite of all his lovable and generous traits he was a born disturber of the public peace". At school he was known as "Mad Shelley, the Atheist". According to Hancock, "The Goddess of Revolution rocked his cradle."

Throughout his life Shelley's opposition toward religion grew less violent; however, he never professed a belief in immortality or religion of any sort. His poems declare a belief in the permanence of things that are true and beautiful. Common themes that Shelley incorporated into his works include the hatred of kings, faith in the natural goodness of man, the belief in the corruption of present society, the power of reason, the rights of natural impulse, the desire for a revolution, and liberty, equality and fraternity. These are all clearly shaped by the French Revolution.

=== Byron ===
While Shelley had faith that was founded upon modern ideas, Byron had faith in nothing. He stood for only destruction. Because of this he was not a true revolutionist and was rather "the arch-apostle of revolt, of rebellion against constituted authority." This statement is easily defended as Byron admitted that he resisted authority but offered no substitute. This is supported by what Byron once wrote, "I deny nothing… but I doubt everything." He then said later in life, "I have simplified politics into an utter detestation of all existing governments." Byron believed neither in democracy nor in equality, but opposed all forms of tyranny and all attempts of rulers to control man.

In Byron's poetry, he incorporated deep feeling, rather than deep thinking, to make his characters strong. Often, Byron portrayed his characters as being in complete harmony with nature, causing the character to lose himself in the immensity of the world. The French Revolution played a huge role in shaping Byron's beliefs and opposition to monarchy.

=== Wordsworth ===
While Shelley and Byron both proved to support the revolution to the end, both Wordsworth and Coleridge joined the aristocrats in fighting it. Wordsworth, however is the Romantic poet who has most profoundly felt and expressed the connection of the soul with nature. He saw great value in the immediate contact with nature. The French Revolution helped to humanize Wordsworth as his works transitioned from extremely natural experiences to facing the realities and ills of life, including society and the Revolution. From then on, his focus became the interests of man rather than the power and innocence of nature.

=== Coleridge ===
Samuel Taylor Coleridge was also profoundly affected by the French revolution. Unlike Wordsworth, Coleridge was more open and receptive to the social and political world around him. He was a very versatile man and he led a life that covered many fields and his work displayed this. He was a poet of nature, romance, and the Revolution. He was a philosopher, a historian, and a political figure. The French Revolution played a great role in shaping Coleridge into each of these things.

According to Albert Hancock, Coleridge tended to focus his life on two things. The first, being to separate himself from the surrounding world and to submerge himself in thought, as a poet. The second, to play a role in the world's affairs, as a philosopher, historian, and politician, as mentioned earlier.
