= Yves Le Febvre =

French writer

Yves Le Febvre (December 24, 1874 – January 21, 1959) was a leftist and anticlerical Breton writer and politician.

== Life and work ==
Born in a middle-class family in Morlaix, Finistère. He studied law in Rennes then in Paris, becoming a Doctor of Law in 1901. A supporter of Alfred Dreyfus, he resigned from the bar of Paris, and registered with the bar of Morlaix, but practiced only rarely. He later became Justice of the Peace in Plouescat, Finistère. He belonged to the urban middle-class and French-speaking, anticlerical and republican faction, which was organized from 1899 in the Association des Bleus de Bretagne (Association of Breton Blues).

In March 1900, he created with Charles Brunellière the Socialist Federation of Brittany, at a congress in Nantes. He became very active as a political journalist in the journal Breton Socialiste, which was succeeded by Réveil du Finistère, in which he developed a legislative programme for republican and socialist rural politics.

A freethinking socialist, he wrote a number of critical studies of the historical myths created by the nationalistic and often reactionary "Breton movement". These were published as the book La Bretagne agenouillée (Brittany on its Knees). He left the Socialist International in 1911 for radicalism and devoted himself thereafter to literature. He is now known primarily for his literary works and journalism, such as the Celtic Tales, the Barbarian Trilogy and especially Land of Priests. He ran the journal Breton Thought from 1913 to 1925.

An official of the Court of Appeal at Amiens after World War I, Yves Le Febvre became president of the Supporters of Morally Abandoned Children of the Somme, becoming very active in the group's role in assisting neglected and criminalised children who were victims of the devastation caused by the war.

== Publications ==
- La Terre des Prêtres (Land of Priests), 1924. Le Febvre expected that this work would scandalize the clergy, but not to the extent that it did, including a long lawsuit and numerous attacks on him. The book contains one of the most vivid descriptions of the Pays de Léon and remains one of rare testimonies of the dominating role which the clergy had in the region.
- Clauda Jégou, paysan de l’Arrée, 1936.
- La Réforme agraire, Imp. Hamon & Kervellec Length. 20 pp.

== Bibliography ==
- Hommage, museum of Morlaix, January 20 to March 6, 1989.
- An Association of the Friends of Yves Febvre exists in Morlaix.
- An Association of child welfare bearing the name of Yves Febvre operates in the Somme department.
