= Celts (modern) =

Classification of related ethnic groups

Modern Celts (/kɛlts/ KELTS, see pronunciation of Celt) are peoples identified with Celtic languages or cultures, living in (or descended from) regions known as Celtic nations on the western extremities of Europe, which were historically associated with ancient Celts.

A modern Celtic identity emerged in Western Europe following the identification of the native peoples of the Atlantic fringe as Celts by Edward Lhuyd in the 18th century. Lhuyd and others (notably the 17th century Breton chronologist Pezron) equated the Celts described by Greco-Roman writers with the pre-Roman peoples of France, Great Britain, and Ireland. They categorised the ancient Irish and British languages as Celtic languages. The descendants of these ancient languages are the Brittonic (Breton, Cornish, and Welsh variants) and Goidelic (Irish, Manx, and Gaelic variants) languages, and the people who speak them are considered modern Celts.

The concept of modern Celtic identity evolved during the course of the 19th century into the Celtic Revival. By the late 19th century, it often took the form of ethnic nationalism, particularly within the United Kingdom of Great Britain and Ireland, where the Irish War of Independence resulted in the secession of the Irish Free State, in 1922. There were also significant Welsh, Scottish, and Breton nationalist movements, giving rise to the concept of Celtic nations. After World War II, the focus of the Celtic movement shifted to linguistic revival and protectionism, e.g. with the foundation of the Celtic League in 1961, dedicated to preserving the surviving Celtic languages.

The Celtic revival also led to the emergence of musical and artistic styles identified as Celtic. Music typically drew on folk traditions within the Celtic nations. Art drew on the decorative styles of Celtic art produced by the ancient Celts and early medieval Christianity, along with folk styles. Cultural events to promote "inter-Celtic" cultural exchange also emerged.

In the late 20th century, some authors criticised the idea of modern Celtic identity, usually by downplaying the value of the linguistic component in defining culture and cultural connection, sometimes also arguing that there never was a common Celtic culture, even in ancient times. Malcolm Chapman's 1992 book The Celts: The Construction of a Myth led to what archaeologist Barry Cunliffe has called a "politically correct disdain for the use of 'Celt.'"

== Definitions ==
Traditionally, the essential defining criterion of Celticity is seen as peoples and countries that do, or once did, use Celtic languages and it is asserted that an index of connectedness to the Celtic languages has to be borne in mind before branching out into other cultural domains.

An alternative approach to defining the Celts is the contemporary inclusive and associative definition proposed by Vincent and Ruth Megaw (1996) and Raimund Karl (2010). It holds that a Celt is someone who uses a Celtic language or produces or uses a distinctive Celtic cultural expression (such as art or music) or has been referred to as a Celt in historical materials or has identified themselves or been identified by others as a Celt or has a demonstrated descent from the Celts (such as family history or DNA ancestry).

Since the Enlightenment, the term Celtic has been applied to a wide variety of peoples and cultural traits present and past. Today, Celtic is often used to describe people of the Celtic nations (the Bretons, the Cornish, the Irish, the Manx, the Scots and the Welsh) and their respective cultures and languages. Except for the Bretons (if discounting Norman and Channel Islander connections), all groups mentioned have been subject to strong Anglicisation since the Early Modern period, and hence are also described as participating in an Anglo-Celtic macro-culture. By the same token, the Bretons have been subject to strong Frenchification since the Early Modern period, and can similarly be described as participating in a Franco-Celtic macro-culture.

Less common is the assumption of Celticity for European cultures deriving from Continental Celtic roots (Gauls or Celtiberians). These were either Romanised or Germanised much earlier, before the Early Middle Ages. Nevertheless, Celtic origins are many times implied for continental groups such as the Asturians, Galicians, Portuguese, Swiss, Northern Italians, Belgians and Austrians. The names of Belgium and Aquitaine hark back to Gallia Belgica and Gallia Aquitania, respectively, in turn named for the Belgae and the Aquitani. The Latin name of the Swiss Confederacy, Confoederatio Helvetica, harks back to the Helvetii, the name of Galicia to the Gallaeci and the Auvergne of France to the Averni.

== Celtic revival and romanticism ==
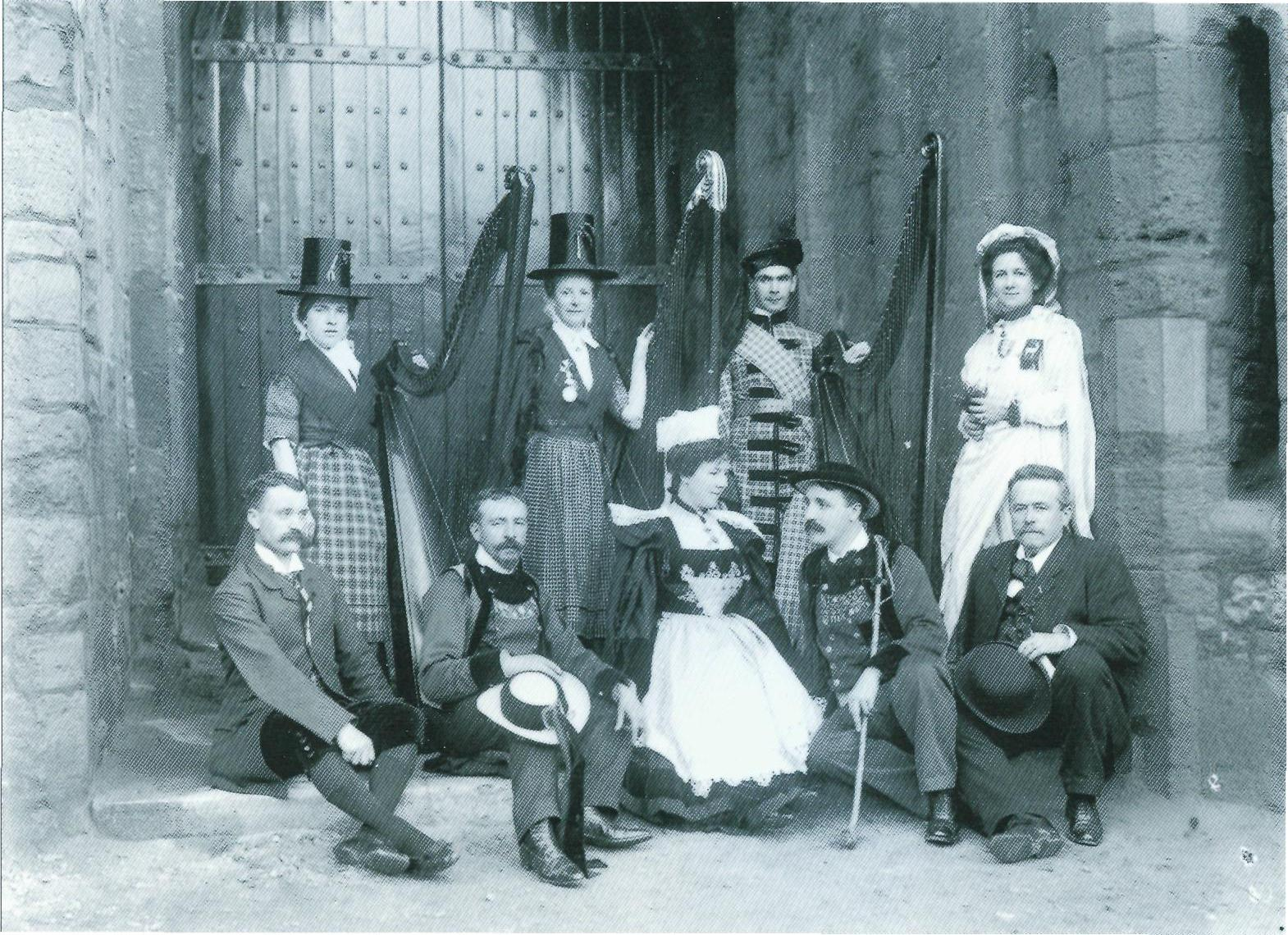
Delegates at the Pan-Celtic Congress, Caernarfon, 1904. Back row: Maggie Jones (harpist of Arfon); Mrs Gruffydd Richards (chief harpist of Gwent), David Roberts (blind harpist of Mawddwy), Gwyneth Vaughan. Front row: Pedwr James, Émile Hamonic, Léna Botrel, Théodore Botrel, Professor Paul Barbier

'Celt' has been adopted as a label of self-identification by a variety of peoples at different times. 'Celticity' can refer to the inferred links between them.

During the 19th century, French nationalists gave a privileged significance to their descent from the Gauls. The struggles of Vercingetorix were portrayed as a forerunner of the 19th-century struggles in defence of French nationalism, including the wars of both Napoleons (Napoleon I of France and Napoleon III of France). Basic French history textbooks emphasised the ways in which Gauls ("Nos ancêtres les Gaulois...", 'our ancestors the Gauls') could be seen as an example of cultural assimilation. In the late Middle Ages, some French writers believed (incorrectly) that their language was primarily Celtic, rather than Latin. A similar use of Celticity for 19th-century nationalism was made in Switzerland, when the Swiss were seen to originate in the Celtic tribe of the Helvetii, a link still found in the official Latin name of Switzerland, Confœderatio Helvetica, the source of the nation code CH and the name used on postage stamps (Helvetia).

Before the advance of Indo-European studies, philologists established that there was a relationship between the Goidelic and Brythonic languages, as well as a relationship between these languages and the extinct Celtic languages such as Gaulish, spoken in classical times. The terms Goidelic and Brythonic were first used to describe the two Celtic language families by Edward Lhuyd in his 1707 study and, according to the National Museum Wales, during that century "people who spoke Celtic languages were seen as Celts."

At the same time, there was also a tendency to stress other heritages in the British Isles at certain times. For example, in the Isle of Man, in the Victorian era, the Viking heritage was emphasised, and in Scotland, both Norse and Anglo-Saxon heritage was emphasised.

A romantic image of the Celt as a noble savage was cultivated by the early William Butler Yeats, Lady Gregory, Lady Charlotte Guest, Lady Llanover, James Macpherson, Chateaubriand, Théodore Hersart de la Villemarqué and the many others influenced by them. This image coloured not only the English perception of their neighbours on the so-called "Celtic fringe" (compare the stage Irishman), but also Irish nationalism and its analogues in the other Celtic-speaking countries. Among the enduring products of this resurgence of interest in a romantic, pre-industrial, brooding, mystical Celticity are Gorseddau, the revival of the Cornish language, and the revival of the Gaelic games.

== Contemporary Celtic identity ==
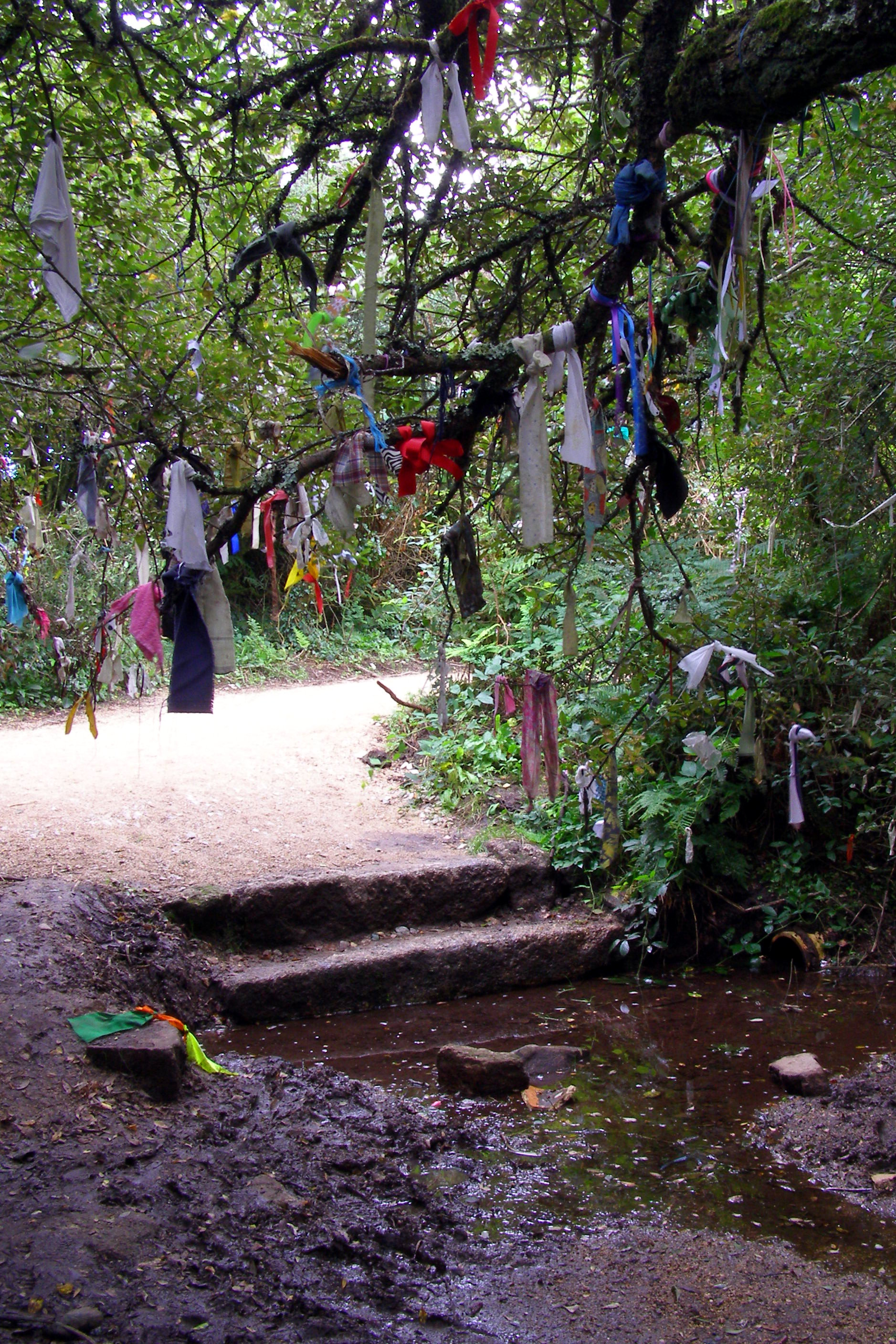
Cloths tied to a tree near Madron Well in Cornwall

The modern Celtic groups' distinctiveness as national, as opposed to regional, minorities has been periodically recognised by major British newspapers. For example, a Guardian editorial in 1990 pointed to these differences, and said that they should be constitutionally recognised:

Smaller minorities also have equally proud visions of themselves as irreducibly Welsh, Irish, Manx or Cornish. These identities are distinctly national in ways which proud people from Yorkshire, much less proud people from Berkshire will never know. Any new constitutional settlement which ignores these factors will be built on uneven ground.

The Republic of Ireland, on surpassing Britain's GDP per capita in the 1990s for the first time, was given the moniker "Celtic tiger". Thanks in part to campaigning on the part of Cornish regionalists, Cornwall was able to obtain Objective One funding from the European Union. Scotland and Wales obtained agencies like the Welsh Development Agency, and in the first two decades of the 21st century Scottish and Welsh Nationalists have supported the institutions of the Scottish Parliament and the Senedd (Welsh Parliament). More broadly, distinct identities in opposition to that of the metropolitan capitals have been forged and taken strong root.

These latter evolutions have proceeded hand in hand with the growth of a pan-Celtic or inter-Celtic dimension, seen in many organisations and festivals operating across various Celtic countries. Celtic studies departments at many universities in Europe and beyond, have studied the various ancient and modern Celtic languages and associated history and folklore under one roof.

Sports such as hurling, Gaelic football and shinty are seen as being Celtic.

The USA has also taken part in discussions of modern Celticity. For example, Virginia Senator James H. Webb, in his 2004 book Born Fighting: How the Scots-Irish Shaped America, controversially asserts that the early "pioneering" immigrants to North America were of Scots-Irish origins. He goes on to argue that their distinct Celtic traits (loyalty to kin, mistrust of governmental authority, and military readiness), in contrast to the Anglo-Saxon settlers, helped construct the modern American identity. Irish Americans also played an important role in the shaping of 19th-century Irish republicanism through the Fenian movement and the development of view that the Great Hunger was a British atrocity.

== Criticism of modern Celticism ==
In 1996, Ruth Megaw and Emeritus Professor Vincent Megaw of Flinders University in the Antiquity article "Ancient Celts and modern ethnicity" examined ethnic identity particularly in relation to Celtic identity in arguing against critics seemingly motivated by an English nationalist agenda opposed to further integration with Europe who saw modern Celtic identity as a threat.

In 1998, Simon James of the University of Leicester in the Antiquity article "Celts, politics and motivation in archaeology" replied to Ruth and Vincent Megaw's article questioning the suitability of the term Celtic in the historic sense. The core of his argument was that the Iron Age peoples of Britain should be considered not as generic Celts, but as a mosaic of different societies, each with their own traditions and histories. Later in 1998, this line of reasoning came under criticism, being labelled an intellectual extension of modern British cultural colonialism, as well as for simplifying the anthropological correlation between material culture and ethnicity. Ruth and Vincent Megaw in the Antiquity article "The Mechanism of (Celtic) Dreams?': A Partial Response to Our Critics." attacked 'Celt-sceptics' for being motivated by English nationalism or anxieties about the decline of British imperial power.

Simon James, in 1998, wrote a response arguing that the rejection of a Celtic past was not 'nationalist' but partly due to archaeological evidence, and usually by a post-colonial and multi-cultural agenda with recognition that Britain has always been home to multiple identities.

Recently, the Insular Celts have increasingly been seen as part of an Atlantic trading-networked culture speaking Celtic languages of the Atlantic Bronze Age and probably earlier.

In 2003, Professor John Collis of the University of Sheffield wrote a book titled The Celts: Origins, Myths and Invention, itself criticised in 2004 by Ruth and Vincent Megaw in Antiquity.

== Celtic nations ==
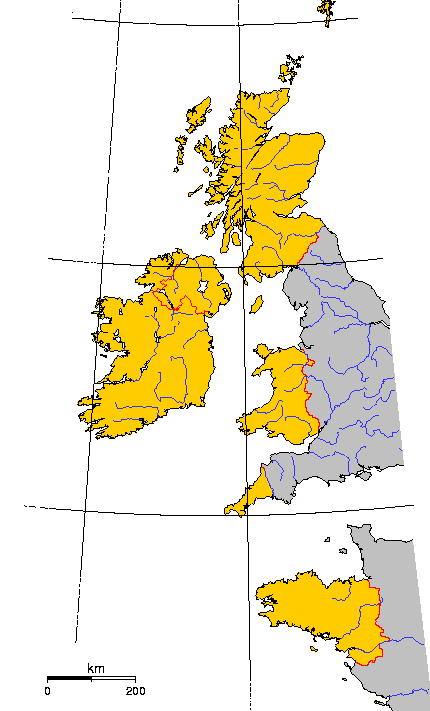
The six Celtic nations within their modern borders are shown in yellow (Ireland, Isle of Man, Scotland, Wales, Cornwall, and Brittany)

Six nations tend to be most associated with a modern Celtic identity, and are considered the "Celtic nations".

- Brittany
- Ireland
- Scotland
- Wales
- Isle of Man
- Cornwall

These six nations alone are considered Celtic by the Celtic League and the Celtic Congress, amongst others. These organisations ascribe to a definition of Celticity-based mainly upon language. Celtic languages have survived (or in some cases been revived) and continue to be used to varying degrees in these six geographical areas. There are also Celtic nomads: Irish Travellers called "Pavee" that speak a language called Shelta that is a creole of Irish Gaelic and other languages, and Indigenous Highland Scottish Travellers called "Tinkers" who speak a language called Beurla Reagaird that is an acrolect of Scottish Gaelic.

A number of activists on behalf of other regions/nations have also sought recognition as modern Celts, reflecting the wide diffusion of ancient Celts across Europe. Notable regions include Galicia, Northern Portugal, Asturias and Cantabria.

A Celtic language did not survive in Galicia / Northern Portugal (together Gallaecia), Asturias nor Cantabria, and as such they fall outside of the litmus test used by the Celtic League, and the Celtic Congress. Nevertheless, many organisations organised around Celticity consider that Galicia / Northern Portugal (Douro, Minho and Tras-os-Montes) and Asturias "can claim a Celtic cultural or historic heritage". These claims to Celticity are rooted in the long historical existence of Celts in these regions and ethnic connections to other Atlantic Celtic peoples (see Britonia, Celtiberians, Celtici and Castro culture). In 2009, the Gallaic Revival Movement, sponsored by the Liga Celtiga Galaica (the Galician Celtic League), claimed to be reconstructing the Q-Celtic Gallaic language based on the Atebivota Dictionary and Old Celtic Dictionary compiled by Vincent F. Pintado.

Elements of Celtic music, dance, and folklore can be found within England (e.g. Yan Tan Tethera, well dressing, Halloween), and the Cumbric language survived until the collapse of the Kingdom of Strathclyde in about 1018. England as a whole comprises many distinct regions, and some of these regions, such as Cumbria, Lancashire, Northumbria, Western Yorkshire and Devon can claim more Celtic heritage than others. In 2009, it was claimed that revival of the Cumbric language was being attempted in Cumberland, England, however the idea that "Cumbric" was separate from Old Welsh has been criticised as stemming from the difficulty that many English historians have with accepting Old Welsh as the language once spoken all over England. It was suggested by Colin Lewis in Carn magazine that revivalists in the north of England use Modern Welsh to enable use of Welsh's existing rich cultural basis rather than having to "reinvent the wheel" in much the same way as has been done successfully in Derbyshire, another area where elements of Celtic culture survive.

Similarly, in France outside of Brittany, in Auvergne chants are sung around bonfires remembering a Celtic god. There are also modern attempts to revive the polytheistic religion of the Gauls.

== Ancestry ==
A profound interest in genealogy and family history is noted as a feature of the culture of the Celtic nations and regions and people with a Celtic heritage. Historically, some people in Celtic areas could recite their genealogy back though the generations as history, moving rhythmically from one name to another using only Christian names as illustrated by lyrics of the Runrig song Sìol Ghoraidh "The Genealogy of Goraidh".

The genetic disorder hereditary haemochromatosis has by far its highest prevalence rate among people of Celtic ancestry. Other traits far more prevalent among people of Celtic ancestry include lactase persistence and red hair, with 46% of Irish and at least 36% of Highland Scots being carriers of red-head variants of the MC1R gene, possibly an adaptation to the cloudy weather of the areas where they live.

Although they are not usually considered a Celtic nation, the Faroe Islands have a population with a large Celtic heritage in genetic terms. Recent DNA analyses have revealed that Y chromosomes, tracing male descent, are 87% Scandinavian, whereas the mitochondrial DNA, tracing female descent, is 84% Celtic. The same can be said about Icelanders. The founder population of Iceland came from Ireland, Scotland, and Scandinavia: studies of mitochondrial DNA and Y-chromosomes indicate that 62% of Icelanders' matrilineal ancestry derives from Scotland and Ireland (with most of the rest being from Scandinavia), while 75% of their patrilineal ancestry derives from Scandinavia (with most of the rest being from the Irish and British Isles). In addition, there are some areas of the accepted Celtic countries whose population are mostly not of Celtic heritage: for example, the Orkney and Shetland Islands in Scotland have populations of mostly Scandinavian descent.

== Migration from Celtic countries ==
An example of a proposed Pan-Celtic flag created by Robert Berthelier

A significant portion of the populations of the United States, Canada, Australia and New Zealand is composed of people whose ancestors were from one of the "Celtic nations". This concerns the Irish diaspora most significantly (see also Irish American), but to a lesser extent also the Welsh diaspora and the Cornish diaspora.

There are three areas outside Europe with communities of Celtic language speakers:

- the province of Chubut in Patagonia with Welsh-speaking Welsh Argentines (known as Y Wladfa)
- Cape Breton Island in Nova Scotia with Scottish Gaelic-speaking Scottish Canadians
- southeast Newfoundland with Irish-speaking Irish Canadians.

The most common mother-tongue amongst the Fathers of Confederation which saw the formation of Canada was Gaelic. There is a movement in Cape Breton for a separate province in Canada, as espoused by the Cape Breton Labour Party and others.

In some former British colonies, or particular regions within them, the term Anglo-Celtic has emerged as a descriptor of an ethnic grouping. In particular, Anglo-Celtic Australian is a term comprising about 80% of the population.

== Music ==
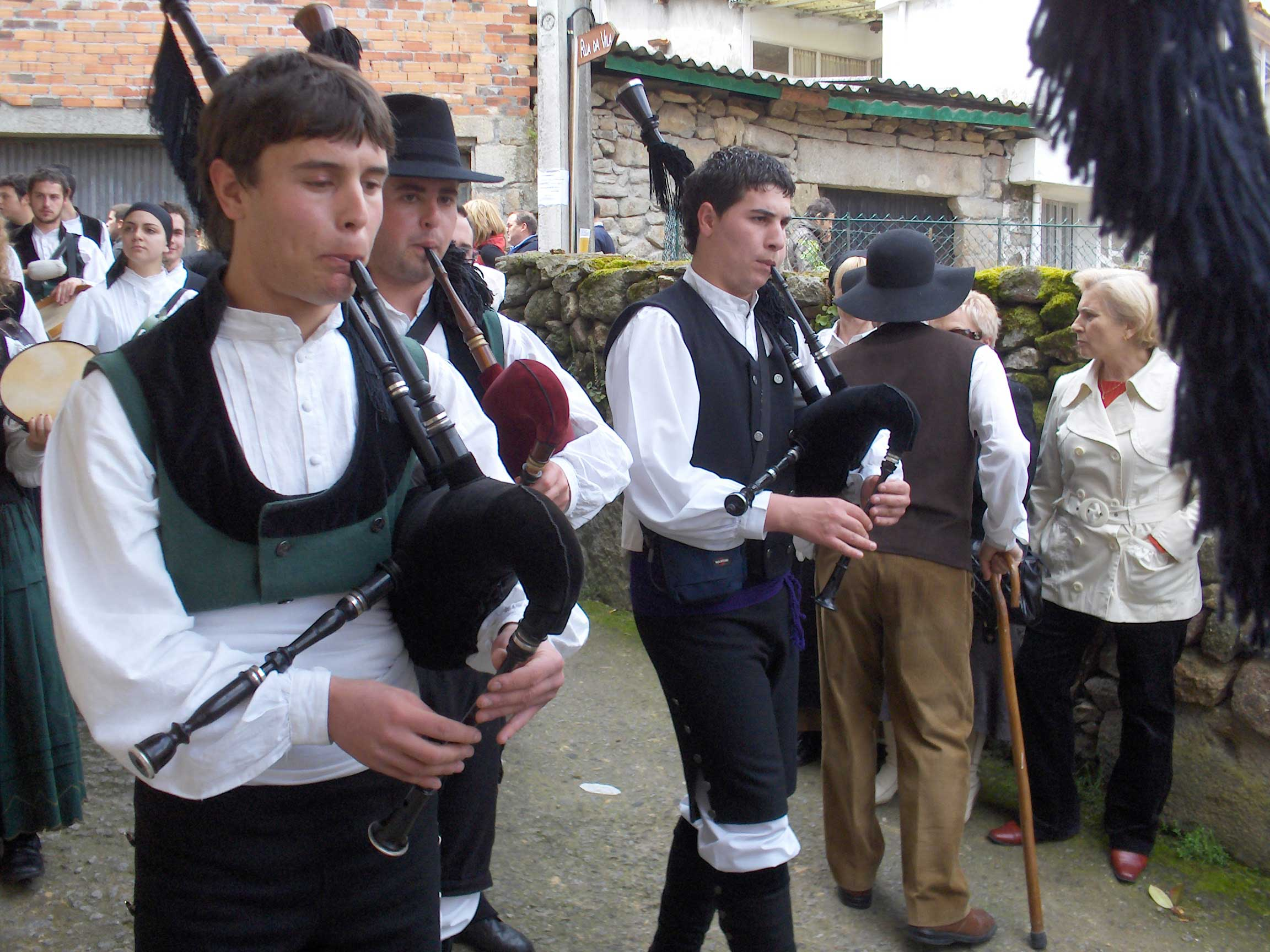
Traditional Galician gaiteiros

The claim that distinctly Celtic styles of music exist was made during the nineteenth century, and was associated with the revival of folk traditions and pan-Celtic ideology. The Welsh anthem "Hen Wlad Fy Nhadau" was adopted as a pan-Celtic anthem. Though there are links between Scots Gaelic and Irish Gaelic folk musics, very different musical traditions existed in Wales and Brittany. Nevertheless, Gaelic styles were adopted as typically Celtic even by Breton revivalists such as Paul Ladmirault.

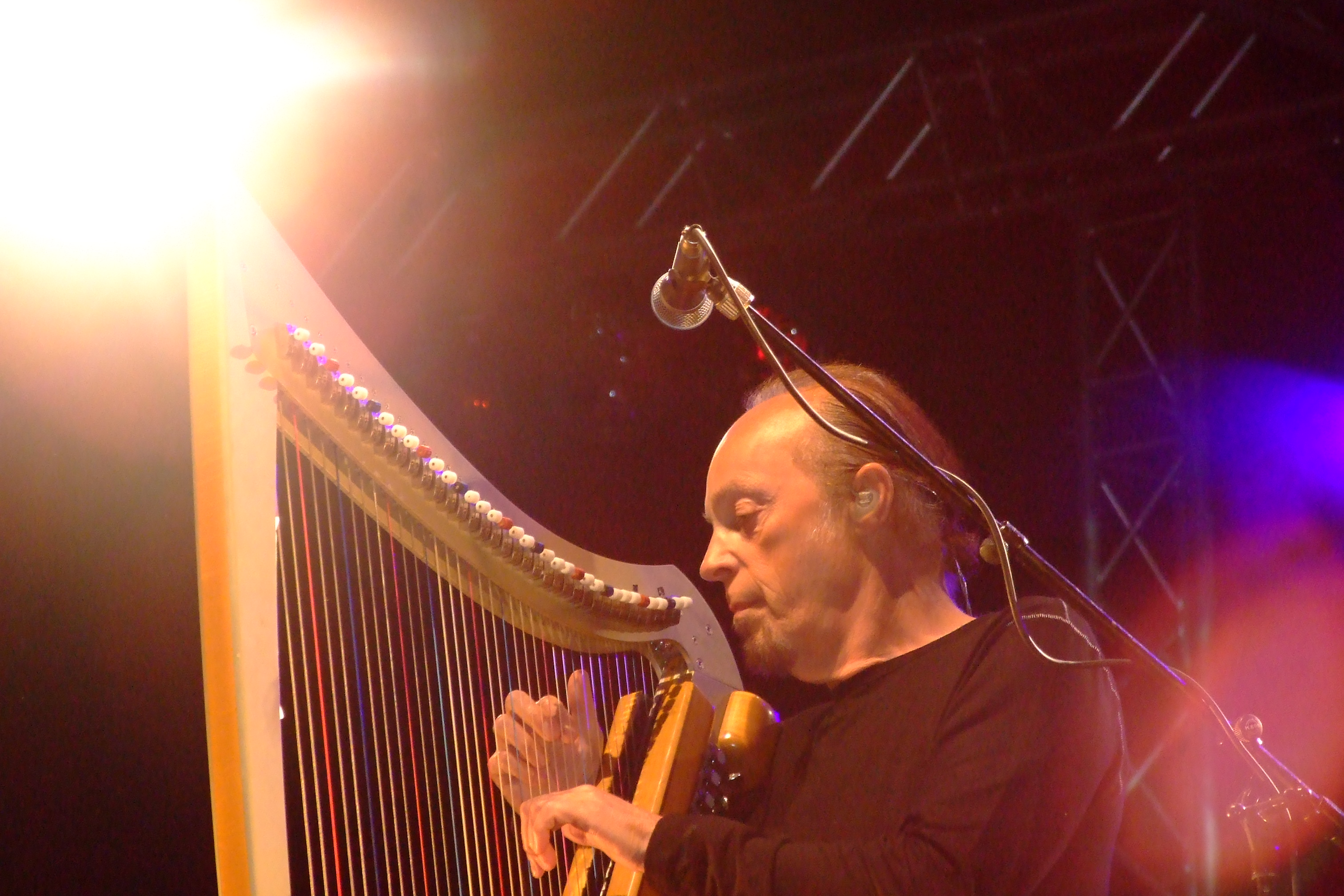
Breton harpist and Celtic music exponent Alan Stivell at Nuremberg, Germany, 2007

Celticism came to be associated with the bagpipe and the harp. The harp is considered to be the national instrument of Wales and is used to accompany penillion singing (or cerdd dant) where the harpist plays a melody and the singer sings in counterpoint to it. The roots revival, applied to Celtic music, has brought much inter-Celtic cross-fertilisation, as, for instance, the revival by Welsh musicians of the use of the mediaeval Welsh bagpipe under the influence of the Breton binioù, Irish uilleann pipes and famous Scottish pipes, or the Scots have revived the bodhran from Irish influence. Charles le Goffic introduced the Scottish Highland pipes to Brittany.

Unaccompanied or A cappella styles of singing are performed across the modern Celtic world due to the folk music revival, popularity of Celtic choirs, world music, scat singing and hip hop rapping in Celtic languages. Traditional rhythmic styles used to accompany dancing and now performed are Puirt a beul from Scotland, Ireland, and Cape Breton Island, Nova Scotia, Sean-nós singing from Ireland and Kan ha diskan from Brittany. Other traditional unaccompanied styles sung currently are waulking songs and psalm singing or lining out, both from Scotland.

The emergence of folk-rock led to the creation of a popular music genre labelled Celtic music which "frequently involves the blending of traditional and modern forms, e.g. the Celtic-punk of The Pogues, the ambient music of Enya ... the Celtic-rock of Runrig, Rawlins Cross and Horslips." Pan-Celtic music festivals were established, notably the Festival Interceltique de Lorient founded in 1971, which has occurred annually since.

== Festivals ==
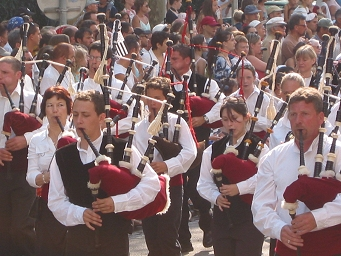
Pipers at the Festival Interceltique de Lorient in France

The Scottish Mod and Irish Fleadh Cheoil (and Gaelic Céilidh) are seen as an equivalent to the Breton Fest Noz, Cornish Troyl and Welsh Eisteddfod.

The Celtic Media Festival is an annual 3-day event that promotes the languages and cultures of the Celtic Nations and Regions in media. This festival takes place in a different Celtic nation every year and has been running since 1980.

The birthdays of the most important Celtic Saints of Celtic Christianity for each Celtic nation have become the focus for festivals, feasts and marches: Ireland – Saint Patrick's Day, Wales – Saint David's Day, Scotland – Saint Andrew's Day, Cornwall – Saint Piran's Day, Isle of Man – St Maughold's Feast Day and Brittany – Fête de la St-Yves and Grand Pardon of Sainte-Anne-d'Auray Pilgrimage.

Attitudes and customs associated with the routine of the year's work, religious beliefs and practices survived the coming of Christianity in the conservative rural areas of much of the Celtic countries. All over these lands there were sacred places which had earned their status in pre-Christian times and which had only been gingerly adopted by the Christian church and given a garnish of Christian names or dedications, hills, stones, and especially wells which can still be seen festooned with rags in observance of an old ritual.

Certain days in the year were marked as festivals, and time was counted forward and backwards from them without reference to the ordinary calendar. In her fine study of the festival of the beginning of harvest, in Irish Lughnasa, Máire MacNeill has demonstrated the continuity between the myth known from the early Middle Ages and the customs which survive in the 21st century. Lughnasa, called Calan Awst in Welsh, is a summer feast and was dedicated to the god Lug. Of great interest is the use in the Coligny calendar of the word Saman, a word that is still in use in Gaelic refer to Hallowe'en (evening of the saints), an important day and night and feast among the Celts (in Welsh it is called Calan Gaeaf). In Gaelic folklore, it was considered a particularly dangerous time, when magical spirits wandered through the land, particularly at nightfall. The other important feast days that also continued to be celebrated under Christian guise, but often with a pagan spirit were Imbolc (Gŵyl Fair y Canhwyllau in Welsh), the start of lambing, now the feast day of St Brigit and Beltane, the spring feast, now May Day (Calan Mai in Welsh).

In their pilgrimages the people combined the celebration of a holy place and a holy day. Pilgrimages are still an important feature of country life, particularly in Ireland, Brittany and Galicia. The most impressive pilgrimages include Croagh Patrick on the west coast of Ireland on the last Sunday in July (the beginning of harvest) and Santiago de Compostela in Galicia. The inspiration for famous Celtic singer and harpist Loreena McKennitt's million-selling CD The Mask and the Mirror came in part from a visit to Galicia and in particular Santiago de Compostela. Some of her songs are about Celtic feast days such as All Souls Night about Samhain on The Visit CD which featured in the erotic thriller film Jade starring David Caruso and "Huron Beltane Fire Dance" on the Parallel Dreams CD.

== Dance ==
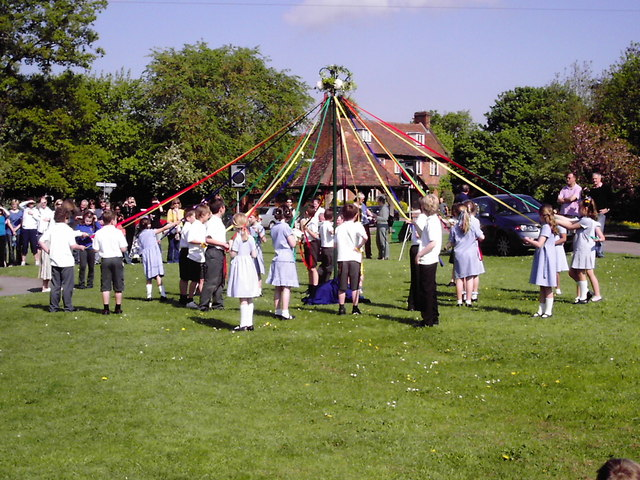
Children dancing around a maypole as part of a May Day celebration in Welwyn, England

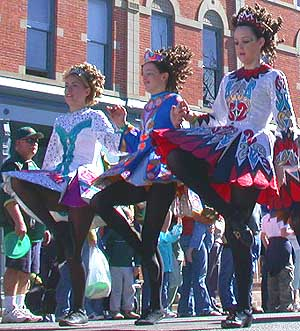
Irish stepdance: Irish dancers at St. Patrick's Day parade in Fort Collins, Colorado

To signal the coming of summer and the return of real warmth, on Beltane (Bel's Fire), the May Day festival time, dances such as the 'Obby 'Oss dance festival at Padstow in Cornwall are held with the maypole as its focus point. The celebrations are tied to the promotion of fertility and a fruitful growing season with the 'Obby 'Oss dancing to the music through streets decked out in flowers, and sycamore, ash and maple boughs. Shortly afterwards, on 8 May, the ancient rites of Spring are celebrated with the Furry Dance procession to an ancient tune made famous in the song "The Floral Dance" through the streets of nearby Helston together with the mystery play Hal an Tow. Fertility festivals like this used to be celebrated all over Britain.

In the 1980s, step-dancer and choreographer Michael Flatley toured internationally with Irish folk band The Chieftains and performed at Carnegie Hall, New York. In 1994, Flatley danced in a seven-minute interval act for the 1994 Eurovision Song Contest in Dublin, which was later developed into the stage show, Riverdance. Flatley subsequently devised his own production, Lord of the Dance. The success of both shows contributed to the revitalised Celtomania of the late 1990s.

== Arts and crafts ==
Inspired by Bain's monograph on Celtic knots, Steve Ball's knotwork appears on the cover of the Discipline album of King Crimson.

Revival of Celtic art has been seen in the Celtic jewellery that revived ancient traditions based on the museum pieces that archaeologists had recovered. An example is the Claddagh ring produced in Galway since at least 1700, but popularised in the 1840s.

Textile craft industries based on Celtic fisher designs such as Aran jumpers were developed in the early 1900s by enterprising island women to earn income.

Following the authoritative publications on Celtic Art of the Hallstatt and La Tene periods by Joseph Déchelette (1908–1914) and Paul Jacobsthal (1944), Scottish artist George Bain popularized the revival of Celtic Art with his bestselling book Celtic Art: The Methods of Construction first published in 1951. Irish artist and writer Jim Fitzpatrick started to hold popular attention from the mid-1970s adopting Irish mythology in comic strip form in his series of books and posters Nuada of the Silver Arm. From the 1980s, public fascination with Celtic Art spawned a small industry in Celtic art books and reinterpretations of ancient Celtic art works, such as the works of Welsh artist Courtney Davies.

== Literature and mythology ==
Similarly, there has been a rebirth of interest in fantasy fiction based on Celtic themes inspired by history and the vast body of Celtic myths and legends.

== See also ==
- Anglo-Celtic
- Celtic Congress
- Celtic League
- Celtic Neopaganism
- Celtic Revival
- New religious movement
- Pan-Celticism
- Wales-Brittany Association

== General and cited references ==
- Koch, John (2006). Celtic Culture: A Historical Encyclopedia. ABC-CLIO. ISBN 1-85109-440-7.
- Moffat, Alistair (2001). The Sea Kingdoms: The History of Celtic Britain and Ireland. HarperCollins. ISBN 0-00-257216-8.
- Megaw, J. V. S & M. R. (1996). "Ancient Celts and modern ethnicity". Antiquity. Vol. 70, no. 267.
- Karl, Raimund (2004). Celtoscepticism. A convenient excuse for ignoring non-archaeological evidence?.
- Ellis, P. B. (1992) "Introduction". Dictionary of Celtic Mythology. Oxford University Press
- Davies, Norman (1999) The Isles: a history. Oxford University Press
- Dietler, Michael (2006). "Celticism, Celtitude, and Celticity: the consumption of the past in the age of globalization". Celtes et Gaulois dans l’histoire, l’historiographie et l’idéologie moderne. Bibracte, Centre Archéologique Européen.
- Les Écossais du Québec (1999). Montréal: Conseil québécois du Chardon. N.B.: This is primarily a descriptive cultural and commercial directory of the Scottish community of Québec.
- O'Driscoll, Robert (ed.) (1981) The Celtic Consciousness. George Braziller, Inc, New York City.
- Patrick Ryan, 'Celticity and storyteller identity: the use and misuse of ethnicity to develop a storyteller's sense of self', Folklore 2006.
