= Hamonic =

Hamonic is a surname.

Notable people with the surname Hamonic include:

- Émile Hamonic, French photographer and publisher
- Travis Hamonic, Canadian ice hockey player

== Other ==
- Hamonic (steamship), a passenger vessel designed for service on the Great Lakes
