= Wales–Argentina Association =

The Wales-Argentina Association (Welsh: Cymdeithas Cymru-Ariannin) is a Penrhyndeudraeth-based charitable organisation which supports links between Wales and Argentina. The income of the organisation is derived from its members.

== History ==
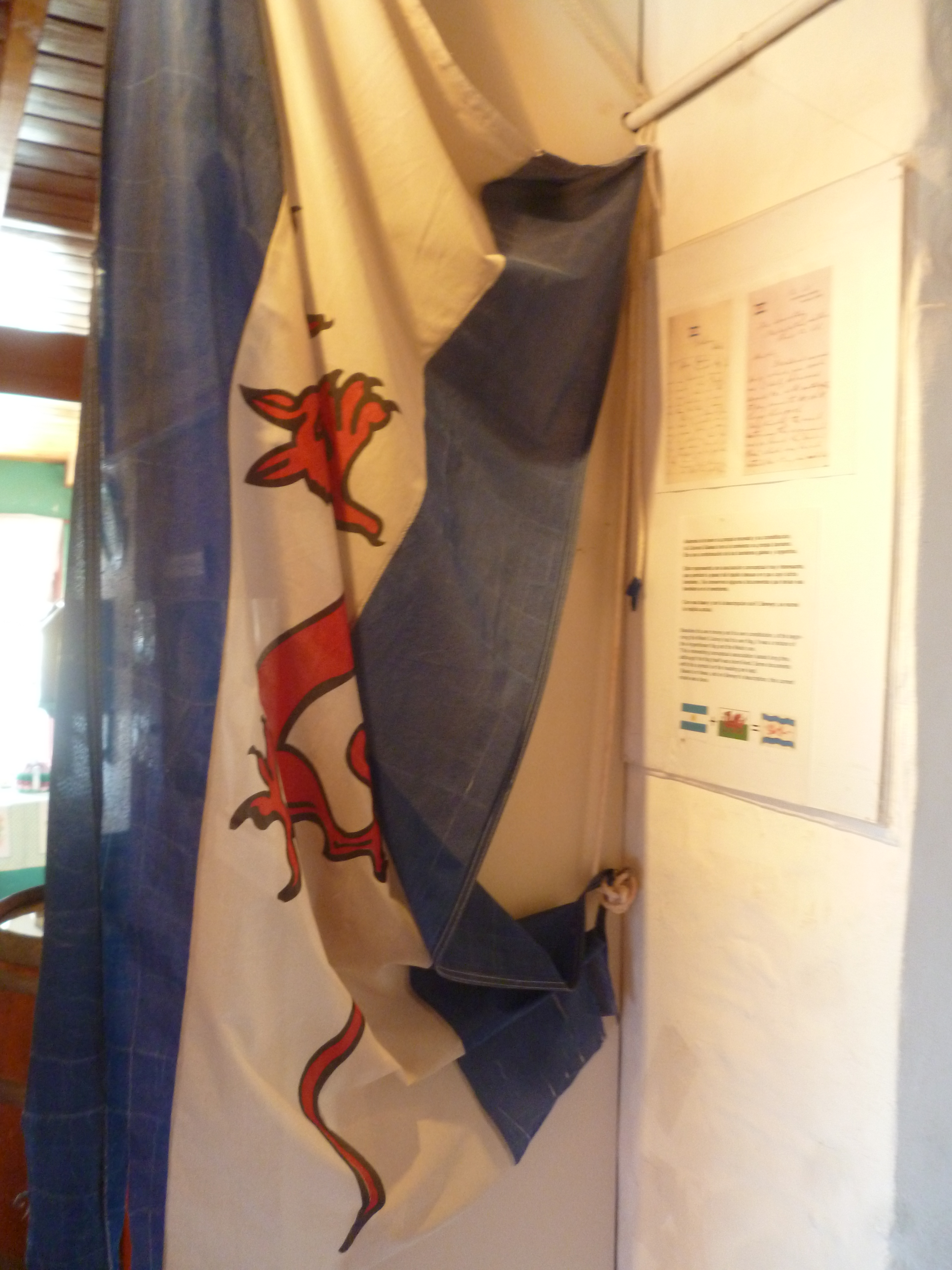
Flag of Y Wladfa, a Welsh colony in Argentina founded in 1865 at Puerto Madryn

The Welsh-Argentinian Association (Welsh: Cymdeithas Cymry-Ariannin) was founded in 1939 by those with connections to Y Wladfa in Chubut, Argentina. This was done in order to create and strengthen links between Wales and Argentina. During the 1999 annual meeting of the association, the name was changed to the Wales-Argentina Association. The National Library of Wales holds records of the activity of the Association, which is based in Penrhyndeudraeth, in its archive in Aberystwyth.

The Association has received funding from Community Foundation Wales, who have described the organisation as a "treasure organisation".

On the 28th of July 2025, the Association launched a new website 160 years to the day of the foundation of the first Welsh colony at Puerto Madryn in 1865.

== Activities of the Association ==
- The Association sponsors and organises the training of teachers, students and ministers of the gospel between Wales and Argentina. The Association has representation on the Welsh Language Scheme Committee in Chubut. The Association also contributes to the transport and accommodation needs of the students participating in the intensive Welsh course held at Cardiff University annually in the summer.
- The Association has sponsored an annual competition at the National Eisteddfodd in Wales since 1978 for inhabitants of Y Wladfa.
- Other institutions and organisations sponsored by the Association include: Ysgol Gymraeg Trelew, Ysgol Feithrin y Gaiman and the Welsh Language Center in Esquel.
- The Association has had a presence at the National Eisteddfod since 1997 and has its own tent. Its meeting is held there annually.
- The Association has hosted workshops in Trelew, Gaiman, Esquel and Trevelin to promote Welsh folk-singing.
- The Gŵyl y Glaniad English: Festival of the Landing) is celebrated in Wales annually.

== Publications ==
- Cymdeithas Cymry Ariannin 1939-1989 (1989).

== Other links ==
- Gwefan y Gymdeithas

== See also ==
- Cymdeithas Cymru-Llydaw
