= Émile Danoën =

French journalist and novelist

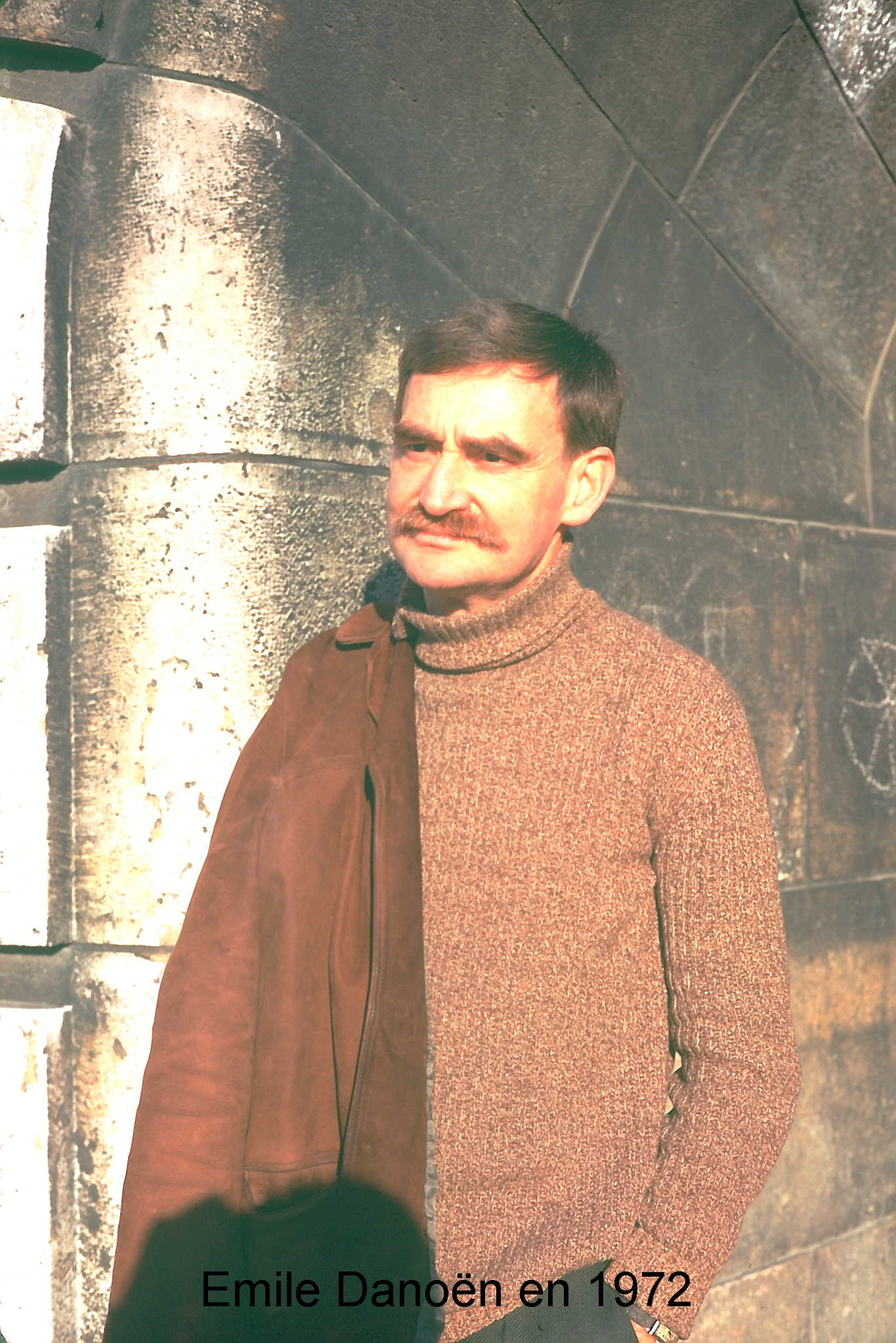
Émile Danoën in 1972

Émile Danoën (10 January 1920 – 7 May 1999) was a French journalist and novelist.

== Life ==
Danoën was born Émile Orvoën, to Pierre Orvoën and Léonie Le Doze at Moëlan-sur-Mer in Finistère, Brittany, but he grew up in the seamen's hostel run by his parents in the district of Saint-François in Le Havre.

During the Second World War, he moved to Marseilles with his first wife Georgette, with whom he had two sons, Michael and Peter.

He worked at the magazine Les Cahiers du Sud while at the same time appearing in bars and restaurants in the old port working as a street violinist.

At this time he met such writers as Joey Bousquet, François Le Lionnais, Paul Valéry, Paul Eluard, Lanza del Vasto and André Gide. He became close to Gabriel Bertin, to whom he dedicated his first novel, Cerfs-volants.

At the end of the German Occupation of France, Georgette died of tuberculosis, following the privations of war. Danoën moved to Paris where he became literary critic of Louis Aragon's journal Ce Soir. He wrote columns and stories for various publications such as Action, L’Aurore, Bref, Les Cahiers du peuple, Europe, Existences, La Gazette des lettres, Les Lettres françaises, Mystère Magazine, La Nef and others.

An excellent ballroom dancer, he met his second wife Christiane Motoret at Bal Bousca, one of the most famous Paris ballrooms at the time. She worked at the Pairie générale de la Seine and was an activist of the Confédération générale du travail. With her, he won many dance competitions, leading to their marriage in February 1946. Their relationship inspired his novel L'Heureuse aventure (The Happy Adventure).

He and Christiane divorced in May 1951. He then married Léna Botrel, the daughter of Théodore Botrel, who gave him a third son, François. That same year he won the Prix du roman populiste for his novel Une maison soufflée aux vents, dedicated to Léna.

In 1952 he returned to living with Christiane Motoret, which he did until her death in May 1972. Together they had one daughter, Laurence Motoret.

While writing and diligently studying at the Bibliothèque nationale de France, (especially documents concerning the anarchist Jules Durand, to whom he devoted an unpublished novel), he temporarily worked as a college supervisor, a night watchman in a warehouse, a sailing, tennis or ping-pong instructor and many other jobs.

Emile Danoën died in its 80th year Meudon, where he lived with a friend of his youth. He married his fourth wife, Francine Bloch, in 1984.

Some of his works were translated into English, Russian and Chinese.

== Select bibliography ==
- Cerfs-volants, Marseille, Jean Vigneau, 1942
- Rue des enfants abandonnés, Paris, Jean Vigneau, 1945
- L’Aventure de Noël, Paris, Jean Vigneau, 1946
- Lignes blanches, Paris, Bibliothèque française, 1947
- La Queue à la pègre, Paris, Julliard, 1949
- L’Heureuse aventure, Paris, Julliard, 1950
- Une maison soufflée aux vents, vol. I : Paris, Julliard, 1951, (Prix du roman populiste), translated by Mary Glasgow into English, published in Britain under the title Dust in the Wind, London, Staples Press, and in America as Tides of Time, New York, Ballantine Books, 1952
- Une maison soufflée aux vents, vol. II: Idylle dans un quartier muré, Paris, Julliard, 1952, translated by Mary Glasgow as The Wind Rises, London, Staples Press.
- La Fille du voleur d’huitres, Paris, Julliard, 1952
- L’Homme qui héritait d’un meurtre, Paris, Flammarion, 1956
- Le Conseiller hippique, Paris, Gallimard, 1958
