= Wales-Brittany Association =

Celtic organisation

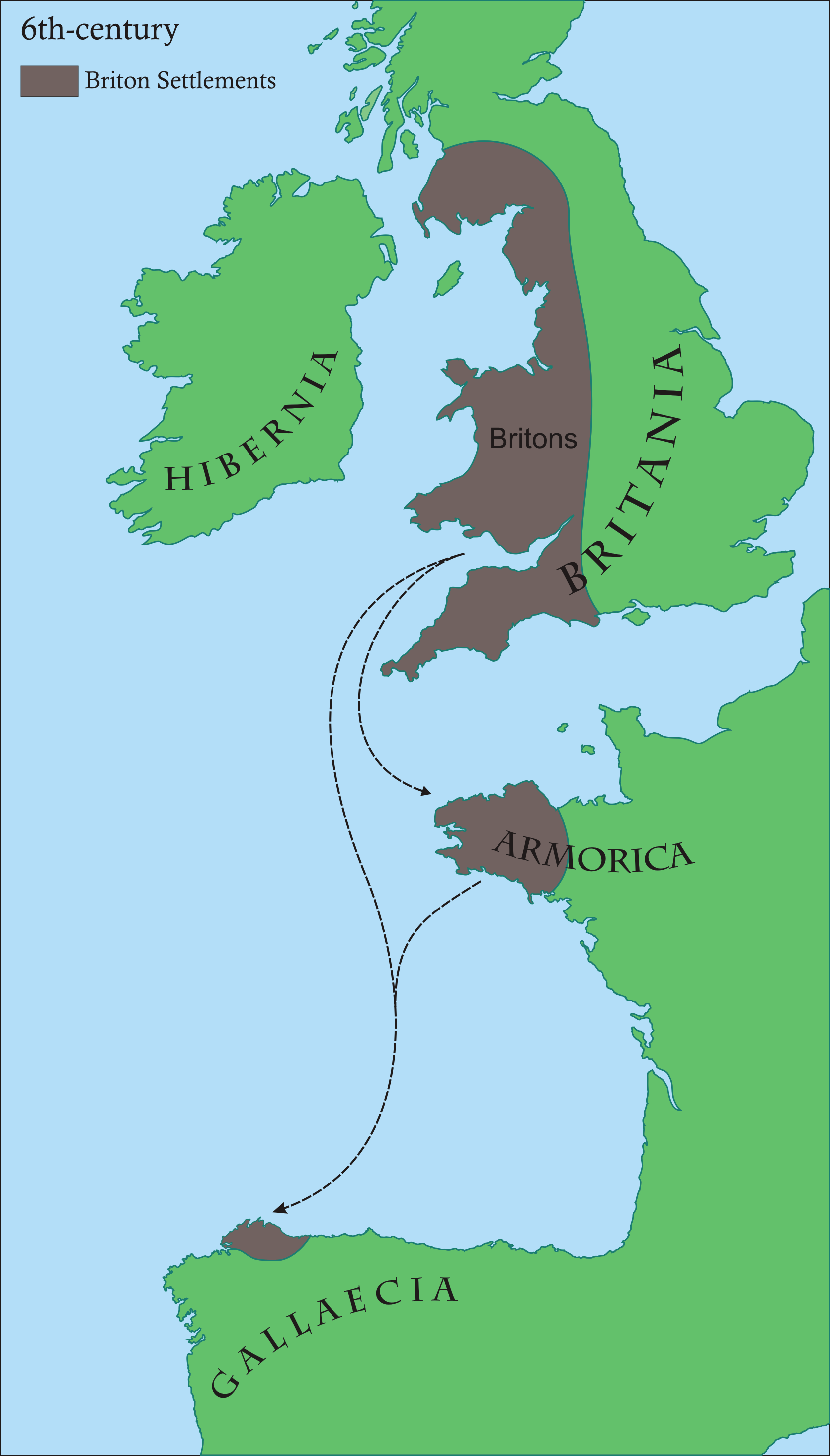
Southwestern Britons settled in what is now Brittany and Galicia after the Anglo-Saxon settlement of Britain in the 5th and 6th centuries.

The Wales-Brittany Association (Welsh: Cymdeithas Cymru-Llydaw, Breton: Kevredigezh Kembre-Breizh) is an organisation which promotes ties between the Celtic-speaking communities of Wales and Brittany.

Welsh and Breton are members of the Brittonic branch of the Celtic language family. Wales and Brittany maintain close cultural ties as a result of their shared linguistic and cultural heritage. Cultural ties were first formed when Britons from southwest Britain fled the Anglo-Saxon settlement of the island and settled in continental Europe in the 5th and 6th centuries. In the centuries that followed, cultural ties were maintained by mutual missionary activities in Brittany, Cornwall and Wales.

The Wales-Brittany Association was founded in 1974 at the National Eisteddfodd in Carmarthen.

The Association has between one hundred and fifty and two hundred members. The Association organises courses, publishes a bilingual Welsh and Breton magazine (Breizh-Llydaw) and coordinates between those interested in Welsh and Breton.

== Gŵyl Cymru-Llydaw ==
The Association promotes the use of Welsh and Breton and has organised events to support this activity. In 2026 it organised the third annual Gŵyl Cymru-Llydaw (Wales-Brittany Festival) in Aberystwyth and Machynlleth, including events promoting Breton dancing, music, singing, films, cuisine and the Breton language. The first Wales-Brittany Festival was held in Aberystwyth in May 2024, with the festival organiser stating that it is "easier than ever to build bridges between minoritised language communities internationally". In 2025, academics from Université Rennes 2 travelled to Aberystwyth University to provide a week-long educational programme on Breton language and culture as part of a long-term collaboration between the two universities. In 2026 the festival took place for a third time and was hosted in the Cooper's Arms pub, Theatr Arad Goch and Aberystwyth's Merched y Wawr building.

== See also ==
- Ambrose Bebb
- Celtic League
- Wales-Argentina Association
- Thomas Price (Carnhuanawc)
