= Gŵyl Fair y Canhwyllau =

Candlemas as traditionally celebrated in Wales

Gŵyl Fair y Canhwyllau (English: "Mary's Festival of the Candles") is a Welsh name of Candlemas, celebrated on 2 February. It was derived from the pre-Reformation ceremony of blessing the candles and distributing them to be carried in a procession. However, just as this Christian ceremony drew on pagan festivals connected with the coming of the Spring, some of the old practices that carried on in parts of Wales until the 20th century suggest older rituals.

== Customs ==
- As with most of the festivals of the year, rites of divination were carried out at Candlemas. In one recorded instance, it was customary for people to light two candles, and place them on a table or high bench. Then each member of the family in turn would sit down on a chair between the candles and take a drink out of a horn goblet or beaker. Afterward, they would throw the vessel over their head and if it fell in an upright position, the person who threw it would live to reach very old age; if it fell bottom-up, the person would die early. That 'drink', usually beer, was associated with Candlemas.
- The custom of wassailing involved wishing for fertile crops and an increase of livestock in the coming year for those who provided the wassailers with ale. Like the ceremonies in Ireland for St Brigit's day, the early Spring was the time to ensure protection and fertility for the crops and animals. If the sun shone on the altar on Candlemas Day, it was thought that there would be an abundant harvest the following year. However, if a single crow was seen hovering or circling over a house on the eve or day of Candlemas, it was considered unlucky.
- The period of time when working by candlelight was allowed, due to it being the dark part of the year, was amser gwylad, the time of keeping vigil. The candle was then handed back on 2 February when the light had increased enough for candles to be dispensed with and the farm animals to be fed before dark.
