= Émile Hamonic =

French photographer and publisher

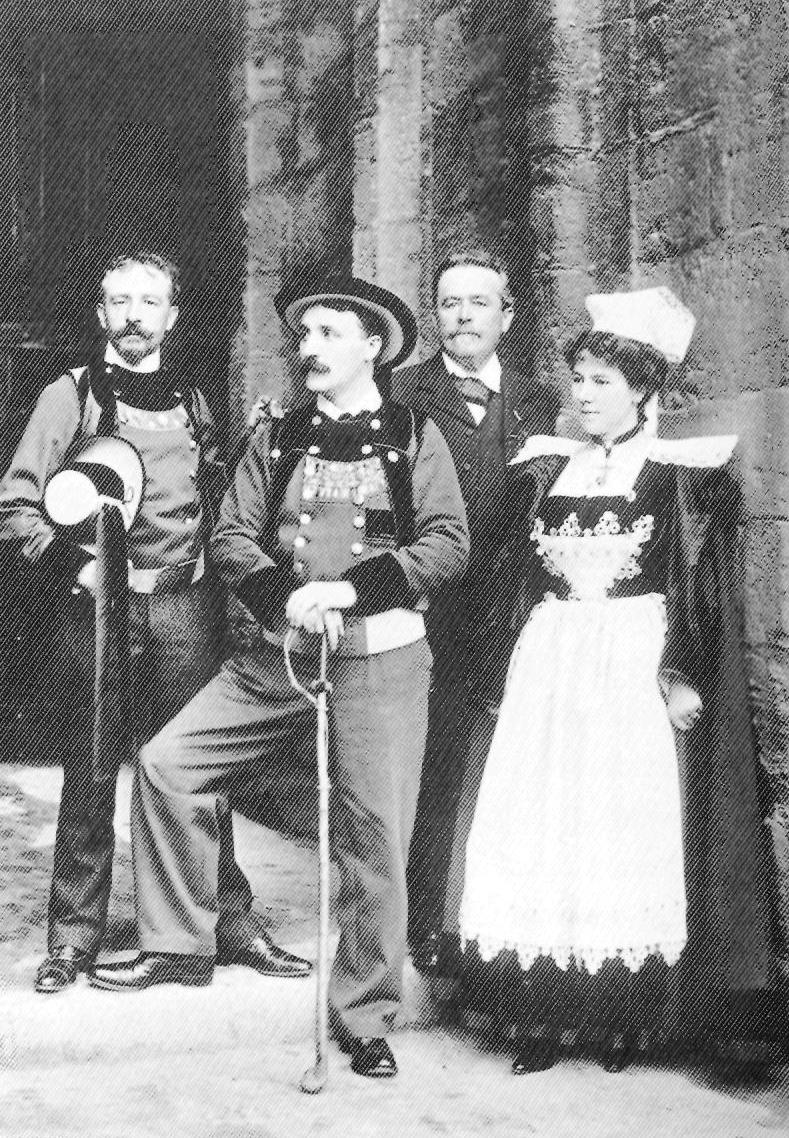
Émile Hamonic (left) with his friend Théodore Botrel (plus Léna Botrel and Paul Barbier), at the Celtic Congress of Caernarfon, 1904.

Émile Eugène Louis Hamonic (1861–1943) was a French photographer and publisher, associated with the picture-postcard boom of the early 20th century. He established himself as a publisher of picture postcards in Saint-Brieuc in 1893, becoming one of the first great editors of this genre.

His cards typically presented idealised images of his native Brittany. He was also a committed supporter of Breton regionalism, and was an active member of the Breton Regionalist Union.

== Life ==
He was born on 26 August 1861 at Moncontour in Côtes-du-Nord. He was one of nine siblings. His family operated a hardware store and bought and sold antiques. His parents took him along on their buying-trips into the surrounding countryside and he became a passionate lover of the brand new velocipede bicycle. He was apprenticed to a photographer in Dinard, and after his military service, he established himself as a professional photographer in Moncontour, later moving to Saint-Brieuc.

=== Postcards ===
Hamonic was one of the first to recognise the development of the picture postcard to France. To provide an outlet for photographers and painters like him, he founded the Éditions d'art Hamonic in Saint-Brieuc. His company was a tremendous success, exploiting the popularity of picturesque images of Brittany for tourists, which were abundant in the summer months. These postcards are usually signed "Hamonic", or, rarely, "E.H."

He is particularly associated with Théodore Botrel, often reproducing on his cards the lyrics of the popular singer-songwriter. Several of Botrel's ballads were illustrated postcard-sequences, in which the stories told in the songs were acted out in a series of dramatic tableaux. He also produced a number of publicity images of Botrel with his wife, Léna. From 1906 to 1909, he published the pictures of Jean-Marie Le Doaré. These cards are signed "Hamonic, the Doaré cliché". In 1922, affected by illness, he retired, leaving his business to his son, Amaury.

=== Bretonism ===
Hamonic was one of the first members of the Breton Regionalist Union, founded in 1898. He actively promoted Breton regionalist identity in his publications. He also helped to develop the pan-Celticist movement, attending the Celtic Congress of Caernarfon in 1904.

In July 1906 he was one of the organizers, with Octave-Louis Aubert, of a pan-Celticist historical festival held in Saint-Brieuc. He was made an honorary bard of the Gorsedd of Brittany.
